= Thomas Pott =

Scottish Master Huntsman

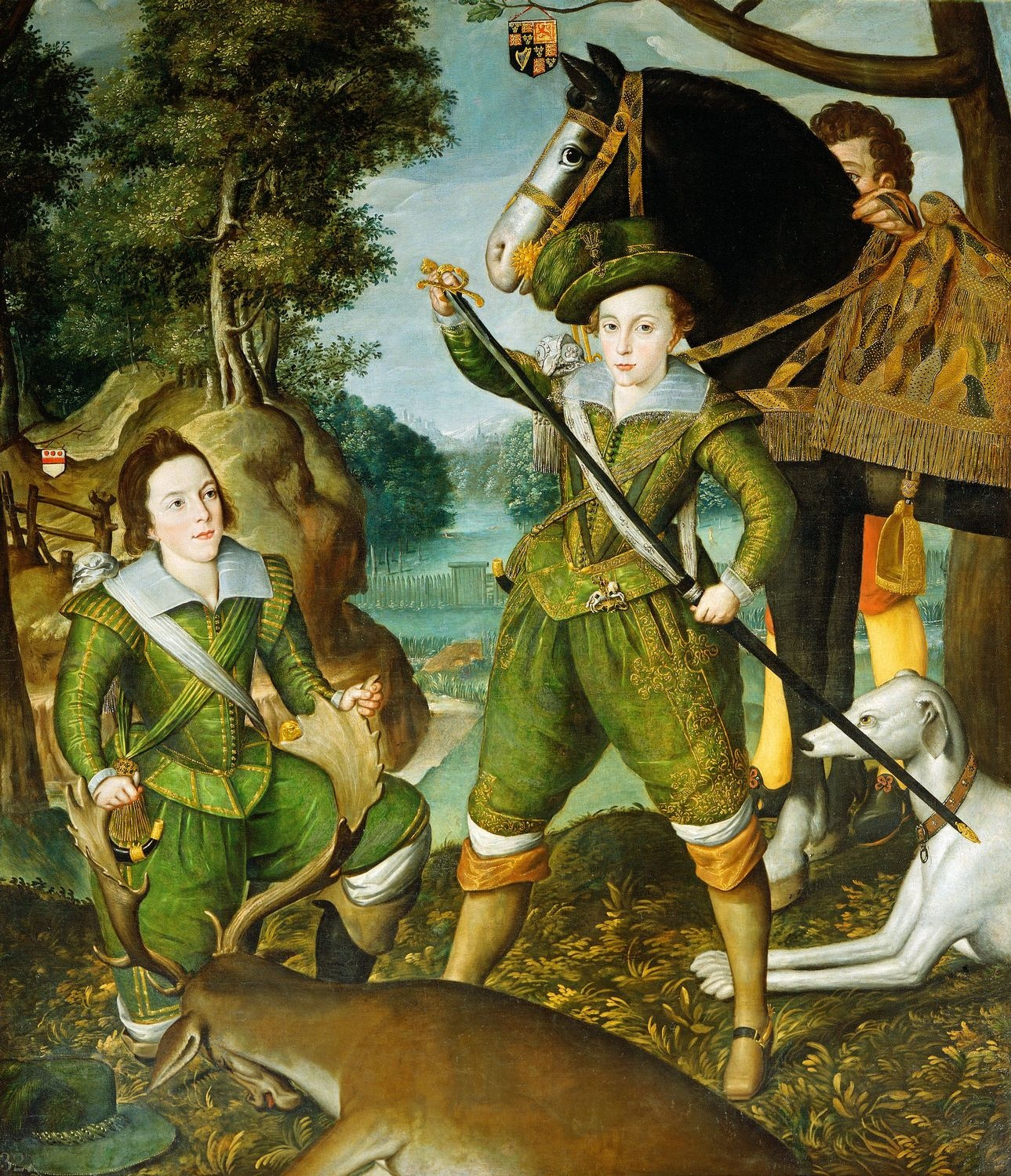
Thomas Pott served Henry Frederick, Prince of Wales on the hunting field and was in charge of his dogs

Thomas Pott or Potts was a Scottish Master Huntsman serving James VI and I, and Keeper of Temple Newsam manor and park near Leeds.

== At the Scottish court ==
Pott appears in Scottish records as a huntsman serving James VI. He was sent to France with a diplomatic gift of horses and riding equipment made by Abraham Abercromby. Horses sent from France as gifts were delivered to him upon their arrival. In January 1603, he was appointed "Master Hunter" to Prince Henry by a letter under the privy seal. Although some of the royal huntsmen in Scotland—such as Cuthbert Rayne—were men from the north of England, Pott appears to have been Scottish.

James VI usually went buck hunting in August, and an English ambassador William Asheby compared him to "chaste and continent Hippolytus, spending the time in Diana's exercise". Robert Walker, who like Pott came to England, was keeper of the buckhounds in 1598. While there are many records relating to the king's dogs, his horses, and their feed, the fine detail of hunting practice in Scotland was not recorded in the accounts of expenses, and it is not clear how much the forms used resembled coursing, Par force, or other kinds of early modern and medieval hunting and fowling. Research continues into these courtly activities, royal parks and reserves, and the progresses made by James during which he took the opportunity to hunt. In England, James ordered the construction of a warren at Newmarket for hares.

== England ==
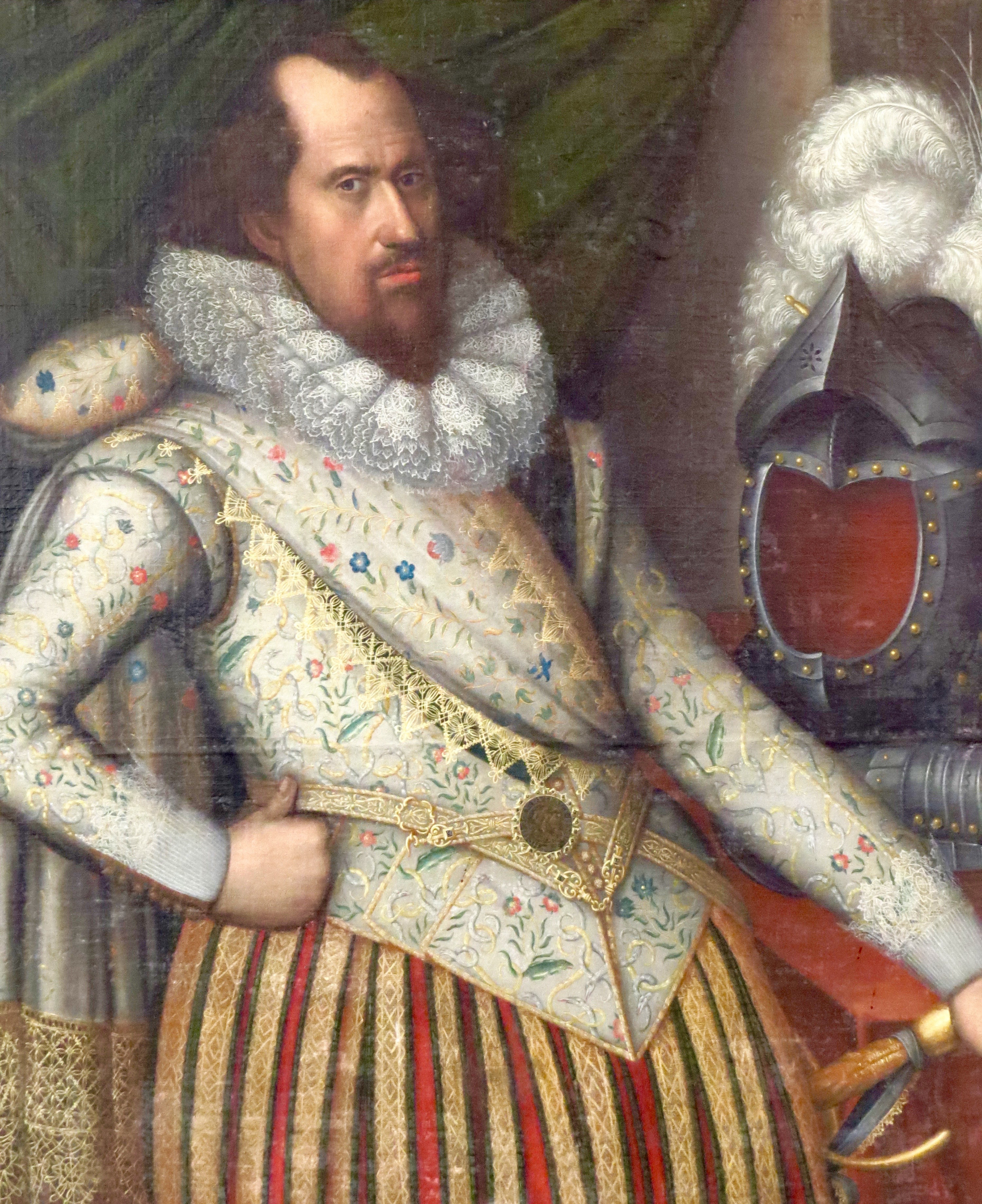
Thomas Pott was tasked with entertaining Ulrik, Duke of Holstein on the hunting field

After the Union of Crowns in 1603, Thomas Pott continued to serve Prince Henry in England. He was made Keeper of Temple Newsam, for which he was paid two shilling a day, and was confirmed as the custodian of the Prince's dogs in April 1605. An account records Pott paying £30 for hounds for the Prince. These dogs were sent abroad as diplomatic gifts. A groom or huntsman dressed in red and yellow Stuart livery clothes can be seen in two paintings of Henry hunting with a courtier companion. Two versions of the picture exist, showing the Prince's friends Robert Devereux and John Harington, with their attendant half-hidden behind the horse.

Pott worked for Ulrik, Duke of Holstein, the brother of Anne of Denmark, when he visited England and hunted at Royston, and the Duke wrote to Thomas Lake to make sure his wages were paid. Pott was appointed keeper of the king's "slughounds" in October 1606.

In January 1606 or 1607, King James made a joke in a letter to Robert Cecil. As "Tom Potte hath a fine kennel of very little beagles ready to carry to France", he wondered if Cecil would be "one of that number". James called Cecil his beagle and made fun of his stature.

Pott was naturalized as a denizen of England in February 1608. He became keeper of Hay or Haia Park near Knaresborough in 1608, and this grant was listed amongst those made to Scottish courtiers. Henry Slingsby of Scriven objected to this gift to Pott, as the keepership of Hay Park had long been in his family. The park is the site of Hay-a-Park Gravel Pit, and now a nature reserve. Pott also had keeperships of Beaumont Grange and Kirby Park near Tattershall Castle in Lincolnshire, properties of the Duchy of Lancaster. These places, and Scalm Park, near Selby were all low lying and marshy or on gravel beds, and Kirby is also now a nature reserve.

Pott travelled abroad several times, taking gifts of dogs from the king or prince to European rulers. In 1608, he went to France for Prince Henry, and the names of his party were listed, giving an idea of his status. "Mr Thomas Pottes, gent[leman]" was accompanied by two huntsmen Thomas Crowther and John Orchard, the keeper of the wagon George Hume, and a groom of the hounds, Henry Lykinge. They brought two pages and a footman. Around this time, Pott received an extra gift of property forfeited by recusants. George Hume, another Scottish servant, was described as keeper of the wagon for the Privy Buckhounds in 1604.

He was Master of Prince Henry's Harriers in 1610, and received a royal free gift of £100. After the death of Prince Henry, he served Prince Charles as Master of the Privy Beagles. In 1631, Charles I allowed Pott to form a partnership with Sir Thomas Badger or Bagehott (Master of the Old Harriers) and Timothy Tyrrell (Master of the Buckhounds) with an exclusive patent to breed and export dogs. The dogs would be bred and trained in England or Wales. King James alluded to "Tom Badger" in his letters to the Duke of Buckingham.

In 1638, Pott was Master of the Harriers and Beagles. He was confirmed as Master of the Harriers on 2 November 1640, and appointed John Roan as a Yeoman of the Harriers. Pott also held the office of keeper of the "slug hounds" for King James and Charles.

=== Marriage ===
Thomas Pott became a denizen of England and married Elizabeth Methold, only daughter of the lawyer, judge, and Chief Baron of the Irish Exchequer, Sir William Methold and his wife Margaret Southwell at Dagenham on 18 July 1608. After his death, in 1655 she successfully petitioned for a pension of £300 per year as a widow of the Master of the Harriers.

=== Endymion Porter ===
In 1628 William Jones presented a poem to the courtier Endymion Porter based on an anagram of his name "Ripen to more end". Jones claimed that Thomas Pott had assisted or advised in this conceit and composition.

== Contemporaries of the same name ==
Pott the huntsman is sometimes confused with Thomas Potts, the Lancashire court clerk and author of The Wonderfull Discoverie of Witches in the Countie of Lancaster. Another contemporary was the Scottish preacher Thomas Potts, who served congregations in Vlissingen and Amsterdam.
