= Alice Nutter =

Alice Nutter may refer to:

- Alice Nutter (alleged witch) (died 1612), English woman hanged during the Pendle witch trials
- Alice Nutter (writer) (born 1962), former singer for the English anarchist music group Chumbawamba
