= Pendle witches =

English witch hunt and trial in 1612

Pendle Witch Hunts
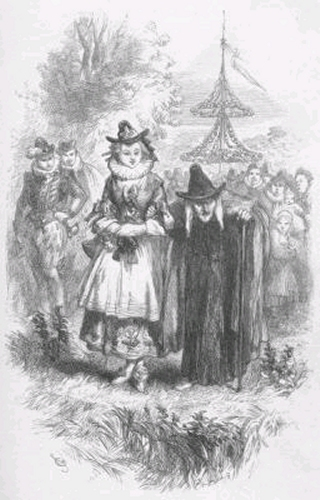
- A depiction of two accused: Old Chattox, and daughter Anne Redferne, walking through Pendle. From William Harrison Ainsworth's book The Lancashire Witches
- Timespan: 1612–1613
- Location: Pendle Hill, England
- Number of trials: 11
- Guilty verdicts: 10
- Executions: 10
- Notable sources: The Wonderfull Discoverie of Witches in the Countie of Lancaster by Thomas Potts
- Notable Victims: Old Chattox, Old Demdike, Alice Nutter, Jennet Device

Location of Pendle Hill on a map of England

The trials of the Pendle witches in 1612 are among the most famous witch trials in English history, and some of the best recorded of the 17th century. The twelve accused lived in the area surrounding Pendle Hill in Lancashire, and were charged with the murders of ten people by the use of witchcraft. All but two were tried at Lancaster Assizes on 18–19 August 1612, along with the Samlesbury witches and others, in a series of trials that have become known as the Lancashire witch trials. One was tried at York Assizes on 27 July 1612, and another died in prison. Of the eleven who went to trial – nine women and two men – ten were found guilty and executed by hanging; one was found not guilty.

The official publication of the proceedings by the clerk to the court, Thomas Potts, in his The Wonderfull Discoverie of Witches in the Countie of Lancaster, and the number of witches hanged together – nine at Lancaster and one at York – make the trials unusual for England at that time. It has been estimated that all the English witch trials between the early 15th and early 18th centuries resulted in fewer than 500 executions; this series of trials accounts for more than two per cent of that total.

Six of the Pendle witches came from one of two families, each at the time headed by a woman in her eighties: Elizabeth Southerns (a.k.a. Demdike (Note: The appellation "Demdike" derives from "demon woman", suggesting that she was "feared and loathed within the community".)), her daughter Elizabeth Device, and her grandchildren James and Alizon Device; Anne Whittle (a.k.a. Chattox), and her daughter Anne Redferne. The others accused were Jane Bulcock and her son John Bulcock, Alice Nutter, Katherine Hewitt, Alice Grey, and Jennet Preston. The outbreaks of 'witchcraft' in and around Pendle may suggest that some people made a living as traditional healers, using a mixture of herbal medicine and talismans or charms, which might leave them open to charges of sorcery. Many of the allegations resulted from accusations that members of the Demdike and Chattox families made both against each other, perhaps because they were in competition, trying to make a living from healing, begging, and extortion.

== Religious and political background ==
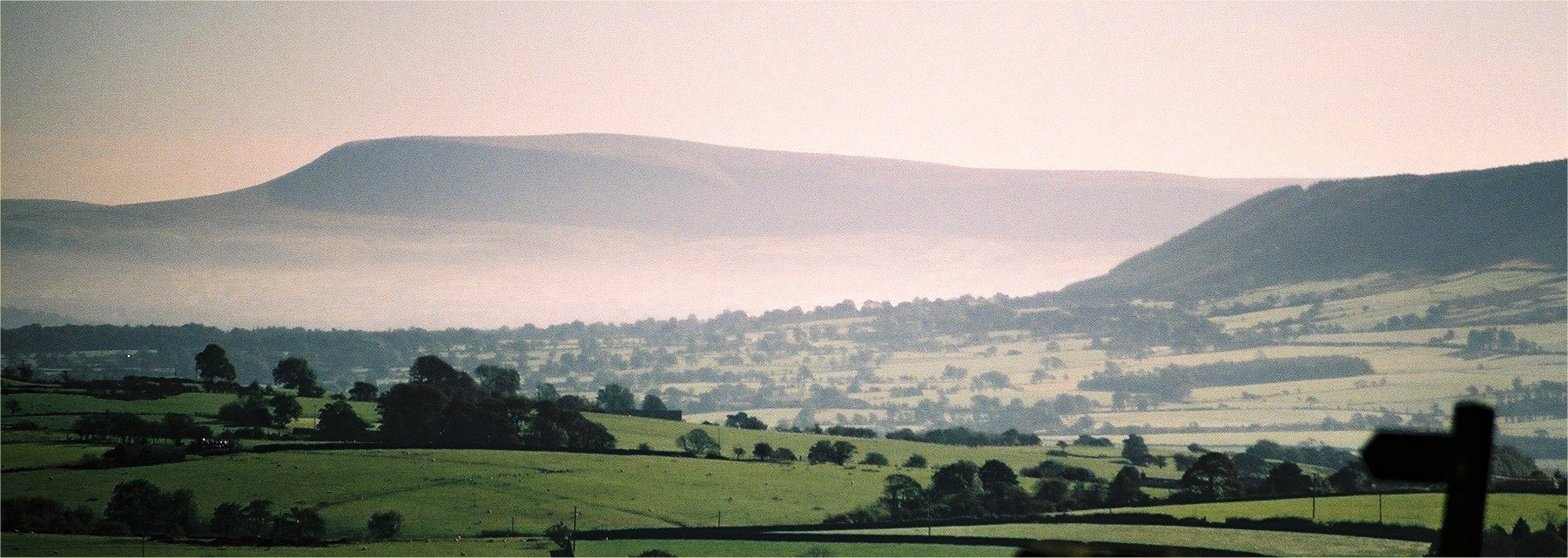
Pendle Hill from the northwest. On the right is the eastern edge of Longridge Fell, which is separated from Pendle Hill by the Ribble valley.

The accused witches lived in the area around Pendle Hill in Lancashire, a county which, at the end of the 16th century, was regarded by the authorities as a wild and lawless region: an area "fabled for its theft, violence and sexual laxity, where the church was honoured without much understanding of its doctrines by the common people". The nearby Cistercian abbey at Whalley had been dissolved by Henry VIII in 1537, a move strongly resisted by the local people, over whose lives the abbey had until then exerted a powerful influence. Despite the abbey's closure, and the execution of its abbot, the people of Pendle remained largely faithful to their Roman Catholic beliefs and were quick to revert to Catholicism on Queen Mary's accession to the throne in 1553.

When Mary's Protestant half-sister Elizabeth came to the throne in 1558 Catholic priests once again had to go into hiding, but in remote areas such as Pendle they continued to celebrate Mass in secret. In 1562, early in her reign, Elizabeth passed a law in the form of the Witchcraft Act 1562. This demanded the death penalty, but only where harm had been caused; lesser offences were punishable by a term of imprisonment. The Act provided that anyone who should "use, practise, or exercise any Witchcraft, Enchantment, Charm, or Sorcery, whereby any person shall happen to be killed or destroyed", was guilty of a felony without benefit of clergy, and was to be put to death.

On Elizabeth's death in 1603 she was succeeded by James I. Strongly influenced by Scotland's separation from the Catholic Church during the Scottish Reformation, James was intensely interested in Protestant theology, focusing much of his curiosity on the theology of witchcraft. By the early 1590s he had become convinced that he was being plotted against by Scottish witches. After a visit to Denmark, he had attended the trial in 1590 of the North Berwick witches, who were convicted of using witchcraft to send a storm against the ship that carried James and his wife Anne back to Scotland. In 1597 he wrote a book, Daemonologie, instructing his followers that they must denounce and prosecute any supporters or practitioners of witchcraft. One year after James acceded to the English throne, a law was enacted imposing the death penalty in cases where it was proven that harm had been caused through the use of magic, or corpses had been exhumed for magical purposes. James was, however, sceptical of the evidence presented in witch trials, even to the extent of personally exposing discrepancies in the testimonies presented against some accused witches.

In early 1612, the year of the trials, every justice of the peace (JP) in Lancashire was ordered to compile a list of recusants in their area, i.e. those who refused to attend the English Church and to take communion, a criminal offence at that time. Roger Nowell of Read Hall, on the edge of Pendle Forest, was the JP for Pendle. It was against this background of seeking out religious nonconformists that, in March 1612, Nowell investigated a complaint made to him by the family of John Law, a pedlar, who claimed to have been injured by witchcraft. Many of those who subsequently became implicated as the investigation progressed did indeed consider themselves to be witches, in the sense of being village healers who practised magic, probably in return for payment, but such men and women were common in 17th-century rural England, an accepted part of village life.

It was perhaps difficult for the judges charged with hearing the trials – Sir James Altham and Sir Edward Bromley – to understand King James's attitude towards witchcraft. The king was head of the judiciary, and Bromley was hoping for promotion to a circuit nearer London. Altham was nearing the end of his judicial career, but he had recently been accused of a miscarriage of justice at the York Assizes, which had resulted in a woman being sentenced to death by hanging for witchcraft. The judges may have been uncertain whether the best way to gain the King's favour was by encouraging convictions, or by "sceptically testing the witnesses to destruction".

== Events leading up to the trials ==
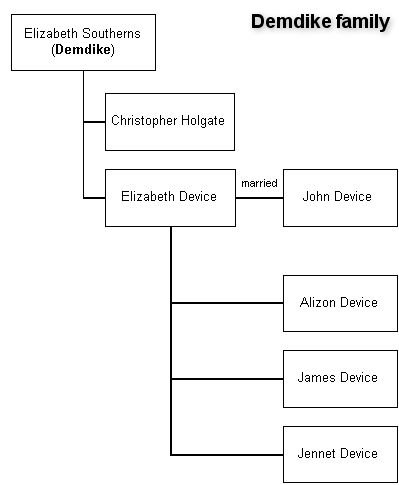
Elizabeth Southerns' family

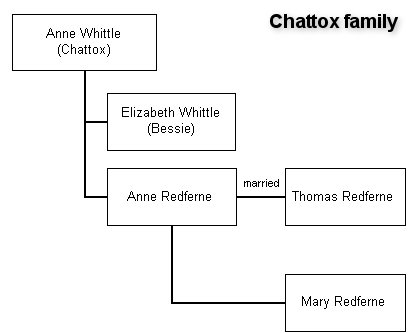
Anne Whittle's family

One of the accused, Demdike, had been regarded in the area as a witch for fifty years, and some of the deaths the witches were accused of had happened many years before Roger Nowell started to take an interest in 1612. The event that seems to have triggered Nowell's investigation, culminating in the Pendle witch trials, occurred between 18 and 29 March 1612.

On her way to Trawden Forest, Demdike's granddaughter Alizon Device encountered John Law, a pedlar from Halifax, and asked to buy some pins. Seventeenth-century pins were handmade, relatively expensive, and frequently needed for magical purposes, especially in healing spells, divination, and love magic. Alizon was keen to acquire needles and later claimed Law refused to undo his pack for a small transaction, whereas Law's son Abraham argued Alizon had no money and was begging for them. Both parties agreed that Law refused to loose his pack and that this angered Device. Law collapsed shortly after their encounter, but managed to reach an alehouse in Colne before becoming paralysed. He recalled a black dog with fiery eyes approaching him while he lay prone. Jennet Device later claimed that this dog was her Grandmother's familiar, named Ball, and that he spoke to Alizon in English, offering to lame Law.

Abraham took Alizon to see Law on the 29 March. By this time, Law had partly recovered his speech but remained unable to walk. He maintained that Alizon had bewitched him and when asked if she could heal Law, Alizon answered she could not, although her grandmother Demdike would have. Although Law made no accusations against Alizon, she professed her guilt, convinced that she had cursed Law, and said that she deserved death.

Alizon Device, her mother Elizabeth, and her brother James were summoned to appear before Nowell on 30 March 1612. Alizon confessed that her grandmother Demdike had persuaded her to allow a devil to appear to her and suckle her, and that soon afterwards she encountered a black dog. Alizon professed that the dog spoke to her and asked for her soul in exchange for his power, that she accepted, and that it returned after her altercation with Law, offering to strike him lame. James stated that Alizon had also confessed to bewitching a local child. Elizabeth was more reticent, admitting only that her mother, Demdike, had a mark on her body, something that many, including Nowell, would have regarded as having been left by the Devil after he had drunk their blood.

When questioned about Anne Whittle (Chattox), the matriarch of the other family reputedly involved in witchcraft in and around Pendle, Alizon perhaps saw an opportunity for revenge. There may have been bad blood between the two families, possibly dating from 1601, when a member of Chattox's family broke into Malkin Tower, the home of the Devices, and stole goods worth about £1, equivalent to about £215 as of 2023. Alizon accused Chattox of murdering four men by witchcraft, and of killing her father, John Device, who had died in 1601. She claimed that her father had been so frightened of Old Chattox that he had agreed to give her 8 pounds (3.6 kg) of oatmeal each year in return for her promise not to hurt his family. The meal was handed over annually until the year before John's death; on his deathbed John claimed that his sickness had been caused by Chattox because they had not paid for protection.

On 2 April 1612, Demdike, Chattox, and Chattox's daughter Anne Redferne, were summoned to appear before Nowell. Both Demdike and Chattox were by then blind and in their eighties, and both provided Nowell with damaging confessions. Demdike claimed that she had given her soul to the Devil 20 years previously, and Chattox that she had given her soul to "a Thing like a Christian man", on his promise that "she would not lack anything and would get any revenge she desired". Although Anne Redferne made no confession, Demdike said that she had seen her making clay figures. Margaret Crooke, another witness seen by Nowell that day, claimed that her brother had fallen sick and died after having had a disagreement with Redferne, and that he had frequently blamed her for his illness. Based on the evidence and confessions he had obtained, Nowell committed Demdike, Chattox, Anne Redferne and Alizon Device to Lancaster Gaol, to be tried for maleficium – causing harm by witchcraft – at the next assizes.

=== Meeting at Malkin Tower ===
The committal and subsequent trial of the four women might have been the end of the matter, had it not been for a meeting organised by Elizabeth Device at Malkin Tower, the home of the Demdikes, held on Good Friday 10 April 1612. To feed the party, James Device stole a neighbour's sheep.

Friends and others sympathetic to the family attended, and when word of it reached Roger Nowell, he decided to investigate. On 27 April 1612, an inquiry was held before Nowell and another magistrate, Nicholas Bannister, to determine the purpose of the meeting at Malkin Tower, who had attended, and what had happened there. As a result of the inquiry, eight more people were accused of witchcraft and committed for trial: Elizabeth Device, James Device, Alice Nutter, Katherine Hewitt, John Bulcock, Jane Bulcock, Alice Grey and Jennet Preston. Preston lived across the border in Yorkshire, so she was sent for trial at York Assizes; the others were sent to Lancaster Gaol, to join the four already imprisoned there.

Malkin Tower is believed to have been near the village of Newchurch in Pendle, or in Blacko on the site of present-day Malkin Tower Farm, and to have been demolished soon after the trials. Surveys point to 'two large rectangular anomalies that were found to be clay floored farm buildings dating to the early 17th century' at Malkin Tower Farm: the name 'Malkyn' has been apparently attached to the site since the 1500s. The evidence seems to discount an earlier belief that Malkin Tower was located close to Lower Black Moss Reservoir, near Barley, after a 17th-century cottage, with a mummified cat sealed in the walls, was discovered by water engineers in 2011.

== Trials ==
The Pendle witches were tried in a group that also included the Samlesbury witches, Jane Southworth, Jennet Brierley, and Ellen Brierley, the charges against whom included child murder, cannibalism; Margaret Pearson, the so-called Padiham witch, who was facing her third trial for witchcraft, this time for killing a horse; and Isobel Robey from Windle, accused of using witchcraft to cause sickness.

Some of the accused Pendle witches, such as Alizon Device, seem to have genuinely believed in their guilt, but others protested their innocence to the end. Jennet Preston was the first to be tried, at York Assizes.

=== York Assizes, 27 July 1612 ===
Jennet Preston lived in Gisburn, which was then in Yorkshire, so she was sent to York Assizes for trial. Her judges were Sir James Altham and Sir Edward Bromley. Jennet was charged with the murder by witchcraft of a local landowner, Thomas Lister of Westby Hall, to which she pleaded not guilty. She had already appeared before Bromley in 1611, accused of murdering a child by witchcraft, but had been found not guilty. The most damning evidence given against her was that when she had been taken to see Lister's body, the corpse "bled fresh bloud presently, in the presence of all that were there present" after she touched it. According to a statement made to Nowell by James Device on 27 April, Jennet had attended the Malkin Tower meeting to seek help with Lister's murder. She was found guilty and sentenced to death by hanging; her execution took place on 29 July on the Knavesmire, the present site of York Racecourse.

=== Lancaster Assizes, 18–19 August 1612 ===
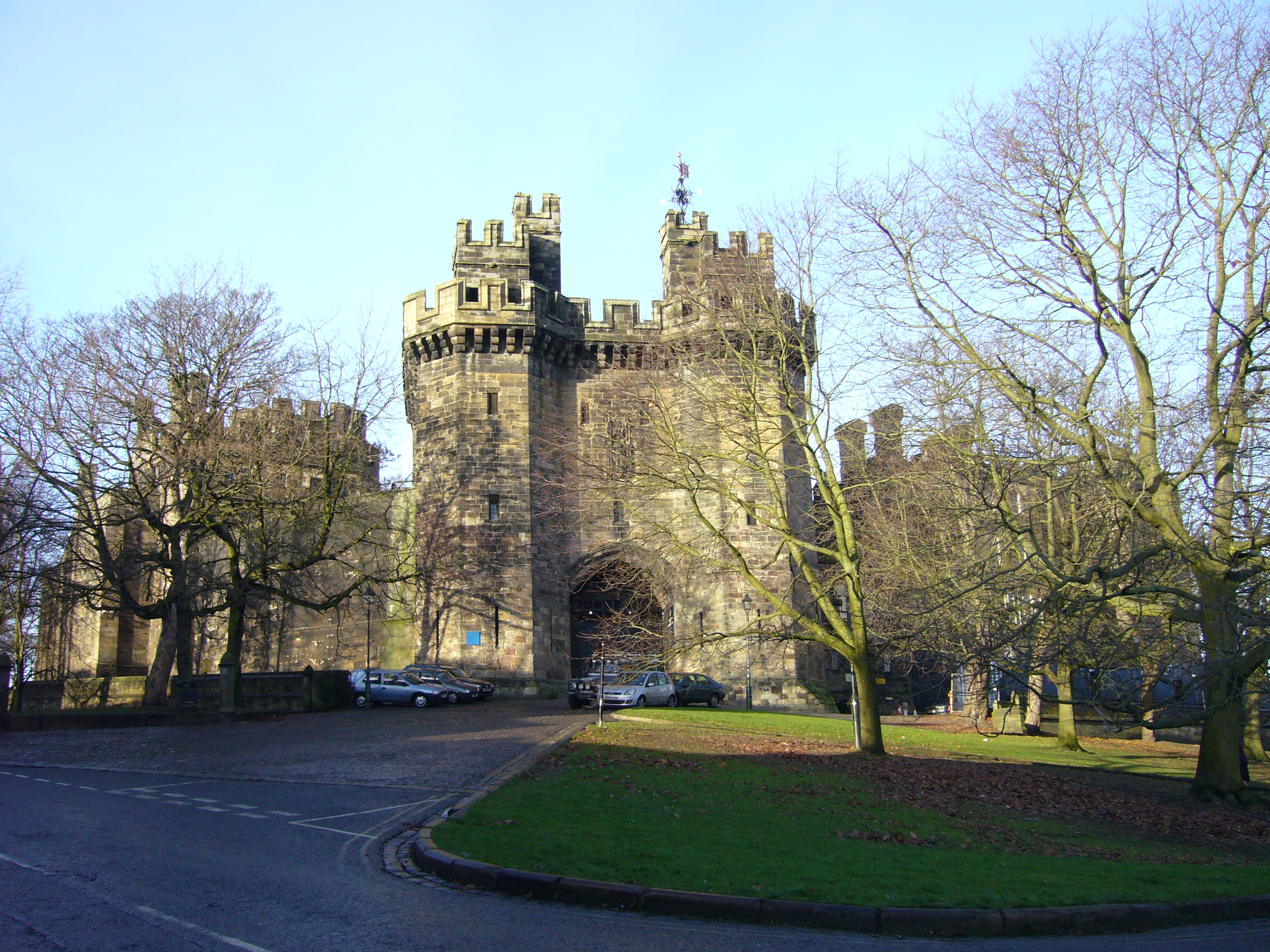
Lancaster Castle, where the Lancaster Assizes of 1612 took place

All the other accused lived in Lancashire, so they were sent to Lancaster Assizes for trial, where the judges were once again Altham and Bromley. The prosecutor was local magistrate Roger Nowell, who had been responsible for collecting the various statements and confessions from the accused. Nine-year-old Jennet Device was a key witness for the prosecution, something that would not have been permitted in many other 17th-century criminal trials. However, King James had made a case for suspending the normal rules of evidence for witchcraft trials in his Daemonologie. As well as identifying those who had attended the Malkin Tower meeting, Jennet also gave evidence against her mother, brother, and sister.

Nine of the accused – Alizon Device, Elizabeth Device, James Device, Anne Whittle, Anne Redferne, Alice Nutter, Katherine Hewitt, John Bulcock and Jane Bulcock – were found guilty during the two-day trial and hanged at Gallows Hill (Note: Gallows Hill is on the moors close to the site of present-day Williamson Park.) in Lancaster on 20 August 1612; Elizabeth Southerns died while awaiting trial. Only one of the accused, Alice Grey, was found not guilty.

==== 18 August ====
Anne Whittle (Chattox) was accused of the murder of Robert Nutter. She pleaded not guilty, but the confession she had made to Roger Nowell—likely under torture—was read out in court, and evidence against her was presented by James Robinson, who had lived with the Chattox family 20 years earlier. He claimed to remember that Nutter had accused Chattox of turning his beer sour, and that she was commonly believed to be a witch. Chattox broke down and admitted her guilt, calling on God for forgiveness and the judges to be merciful to her daughter, Anne Redferne.

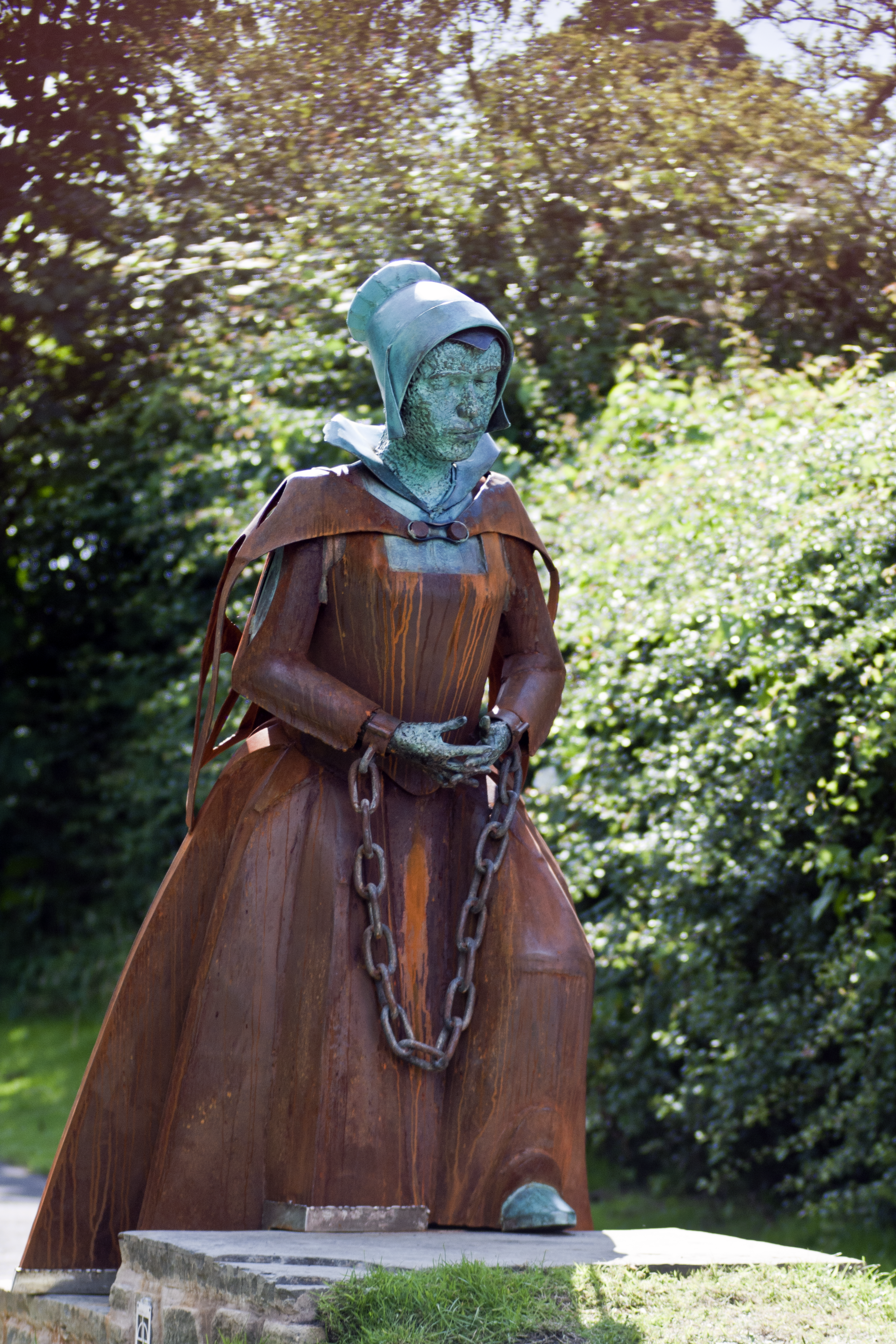
Statue of Alice Nutter in Roughlee

Elizabeth Device was charged with the murders of James Robinson, John Robinson and, together with Alice Nutter and Demdike, the murder of Henry Mitton. Elizabeth Device vehemently maintained her innocence. Potts records that "this odious witch" suffered from a facial deformity resulting in her left eye being set lower than her right. The main witness against Device was her daughter, Jennet, who was about nine years old. When Jennet was brought into the courtroom and asked to stand up and give evidence against her mother, Elizabeth, confronted with her own child making accusations that would lead to her execution, began to curse and scream at her daughter, forcing the judges to have her removed from the courtroom before the evidence could be heard. Jennet was placed on a table and stated that she believed her mother had been a witch for three or four years. She also said her mother had a familiar called Ball, who appeared in the shape of a brown dog. Jennet claimed to have witnessed conversations between Ball and her mother, in which Ball had been asked to help with various murders. James Device also gave evidence against his mother, saying he had seen her making a clay figure of one of her victims, John Robinson. Elizabeth Device was found guilty.

James Device pleaded not guilty to the murders by witchcraft of Anne Townley and John Duckworth. However he, like Chattox, had earlier made a confession to Nowell, which was read out in court. That, and the evidence presented against him by his sister Jennet, who said that she had seen her brother asking a black dog he had conjured up to help him kill Townley, was sufficient to persuade the jury to find him guilty.

==== 19 August ====
The trials of the three Samlesbury witches were heard before Anne Redferne's first appearance in court, late in the afternoon, charged with the murder of Robert Nutter. The evidence against her was considered unsatisfactory, and she was acquitted.

Anne Redferne was not so fortunate the following day, when she faced her second trial, for the murder of Robert Nutter's father, Christopher, to which she pleaded not guilty. Demdike's statement to Nowell, which accused Anne of having made clay figures of the Nutter family, was read out in court. Witnesses were called to testify that Anne was a witch "more dangerous than her Mother". But she refused to admit her guilt to the end, and had given no evidence against any others of the accused. Anne Redferne was found guilty.

Jane Bulcock and her son John Bulcock, both from Newchurch in Pendle, were accused and found guilty of the murder by witchcraft of Jennet Deane. Both denied that they had attended the meeting at Malkin Tower, but Jennet Device identified Jane as having been one of those present, and John as having turned the spit to roast the stolen sheep, the centrepiece of the Good Friday meeting at the Demdike's home.

Alice Nutter was unusual among the accused in being comparatively wealthy, the widow of a tenant yeoman farmer. She made no statement either before or during her trial, except to enter her plea of not guilty to the charge of murdering Henry Mitton by witchcraft. The prosecution alleged that she, together with Demdike and Elizabeth Device, had caused Mitton's death after he had refused to give Demdike a penny she had begged from him. The only evidence against Alice seems to have been that James Device claimed Demdike had told him of the murder, and Jennet Device in her statement said that Alice had been present at the Malkin Tower meeting. Alice may have called in on the meeting at Malkin Tower on her way to a secret (and illegal) Good Friday Catholic service, and refused to speak for fear of incriminating her fellow Catholics. Many of the Nutter family were Catholics, and two had been executed as Jesuit priests, John Nutter in 1584 and his brother Robert in 1600. Alice Nutter was found guilty.

Katherine Hewitt (a.k.a. Mould-Heeles) was charged and found guilty of the murder of Anne Foulds. She was the wife of a clothier from Colne, and had attended the meeting at Malkin Tower with Alice Grey. According to the evidence given by James Device, both Hewitt and Grey told the others at that meeting that they had killed a child from Colne, Anne Foulds. Jennet Device also picked Katherine out of a line-up, and confirmed her attendance at the Malkin Tower meeting.

Alice Grey was accused with Katherine Hewitt of the murder of Anne Foulds. Potts does not provide an account of Alice Grey's trial, simply recording her as one of the Samlesbury witches – which she was not, as she was one of those identified as having been at the Malkin Tower meeting – and naming her in the list of those found not guilty.

Alizon Device, whose encounter with John Law had triggered the events leading up to the trials, was charged with causing harm by witchcraft. Uniquely among the accused, Alizon was confronted in court by her alleged victim, John Law. She seems to have genuinely believed in her own guilt; when Law was brought into court Alizon fell to her knees in tears and confessed. She was found guilty.

== The Wonderfull Discoverie of Witches in the Countie of Lancaster ==
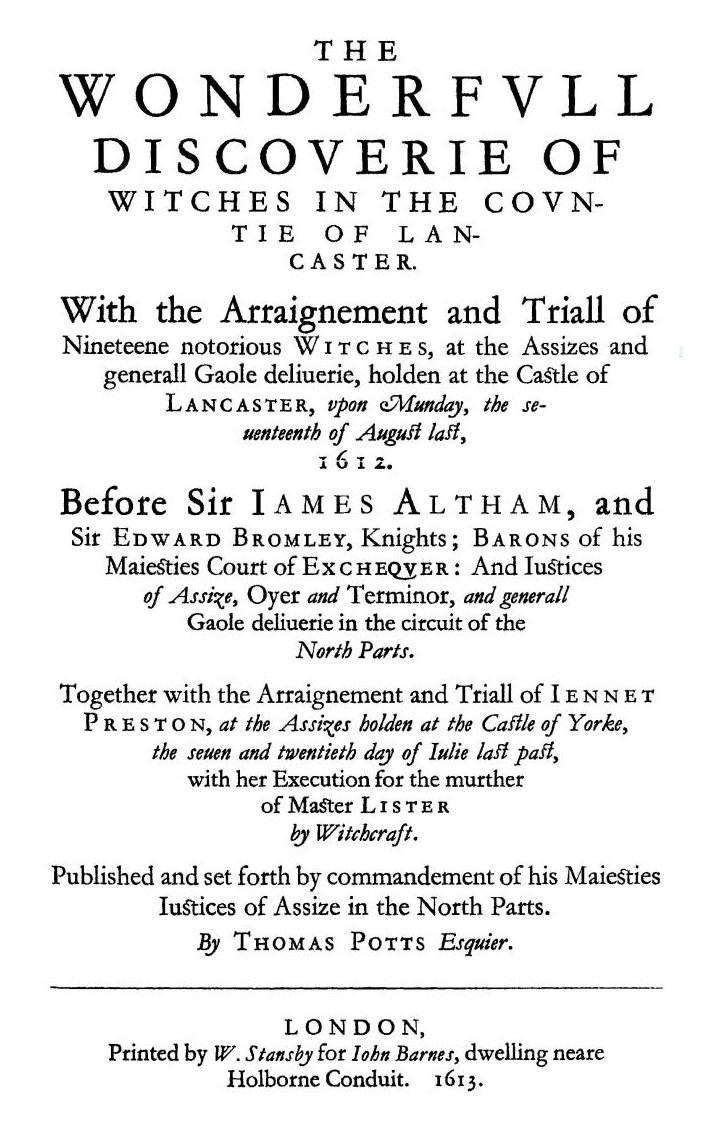
Title page of the original edition published in 1613

Almost everything that is known about the trials comes from a report of the proceedings written by Thomas Potts, the clerk to the Lancaster Assizes. Potts was instructed to write his account by the trial judges, and had completed the work by 16 November 1612, when he submitted it for review. Bromley revised and corrected the manuscript before its publication in 1613, declaring it to be "truly reported" and "fit and worthie to be published".

Although written as an apparently verbatim account, The Wonderfull Discoverie is not a report of what was actually said at the trial but is instead reflecting what happened. Nevertheless, Potts "seems to give a generally trustworthy, although not comprehensive, account of an Assize witchcraft trial, provided that the reader is constantly aware of his use of written material instead of verbatim reports".

The trials took place not quite seven years after the Gunpowder Plot to blow up the Houses of Parliament in an attempt to kill King James and the Protestant aristocracy had been foiled. It was alleged that the Pendle witches had hatched their own gunpowder plot to blow up Lancaster Castle, although historian Stephen Pumfrey has suggested that the "preposterous scheme" was invented by the examining magistrates and simply agreed to by James Device in his witness statement. It may therefore be significant that Potts dedicated The Wonderfull Discoverie to Thomas Knyvet and his wife Elizabeth; Knyvet was the man credited with apprehending Guy Fawkes and thus saving the King.

== Modern interpretation ==
It has been estimated that all the English witch trials between the early 15th and early 18th centuries resulted in fewer than 500 executions, so this one series of trials in July and August 1612 accounts for more than two per cent of that total. Court records show that Lancashire was unusual in the north of England for the frequency of its witch trials. Neighbouring Cheshire, for instance, also suffered from economic problems and religious activists, but there only 47 people were indicted for causing harm by witchcraft between 1589 and 1675, of whom 11 were found guilty.

Pendle was part of the parish of Whalley, an area covering 180 square miles (470 km^{2}), too large to be effective in preaching and teaching the doctrines of the Church of England: both the survival of Catholicism and the upsurge of witchcraft in Lancashire have been attributed to its over-stretched parochial structure. Until its dissolution, the spiritual needs of the people of Pendle and surrounding districts had been served by nearby Whalley Abbey, but its closure in 1537 left a vacuum in respect of organised religion.

Many of the allegations made in the Pendle witch trials resulted from members of the Demdike and Chattox families making accusations against each other. The situation has been described by one historian as ″a trial in which one family destroyed the other and then turned suicidally on itself, with children betraying siblings and parents.″ There may have been bad blood between the Demdike and Chattox families because they were in competition with each other, trying to make a living from healing, begging, and extortion. The Demdikes are believed to have lived close to Newchurch in Pendle, and the Chattox family about 2 miles (3.2 km) away, near the village of Fence.

The role that both close family ties and toxic relationships played in the trials comes into play again when one considers that the star witness during the trial was Jennet, who testified against almost her whole family. Some historians, such as Winsham, are prepared to give Jennet the benefit of the doubt, pointing that she was clearly being coached by Nowell during the trial. Others such as Lumby point out that Jennet seemed to relish her role as chief witness and the revenge she was unleashing on her own kin: ″the sweet child seems to have delighted in damming all her family.″

Historian John Swain has said that the outbreaks of witchcraft in and around Pendle demonstrate the extent to which people could make a living either by posing as a witch, or by accusing or threatening to accuse others of being a witch. Although it is implicit in much of the literature on witchcraft that the accused were victims, often mentally or physically abnormal, for some at least, it may have been a trade like any other, albeit one with significant risks.

== Aftermath and legacy ==
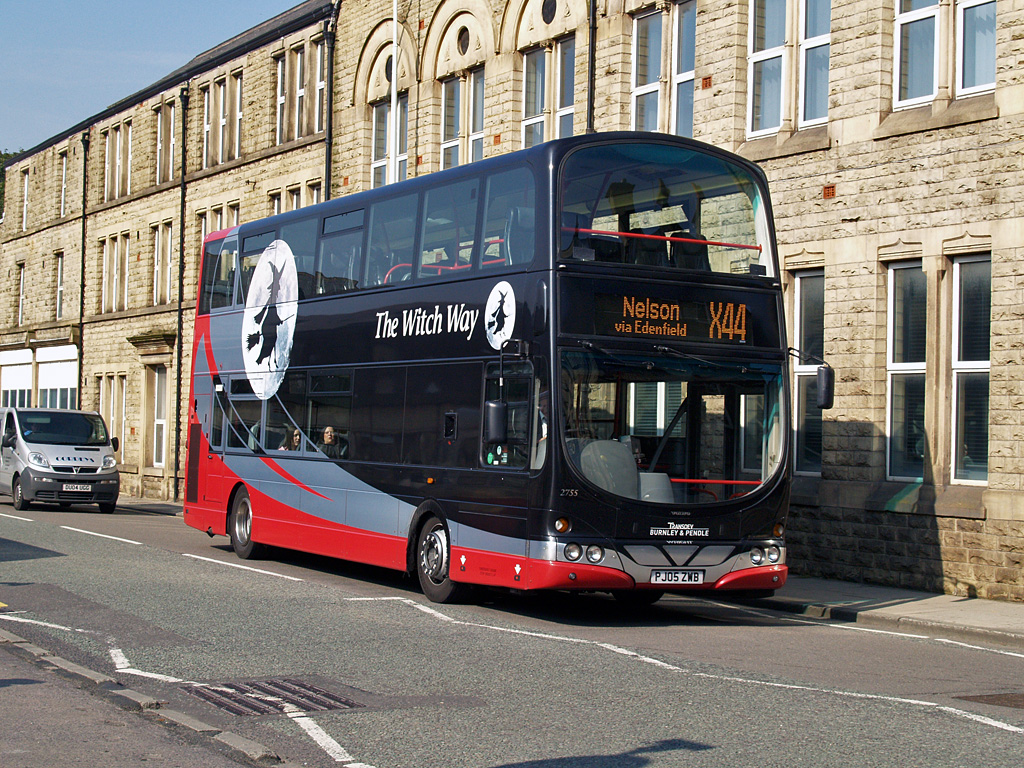
A "The Witch Way" Transdev in Burnley & Pendle bus

Altham continued with his judicial career until his death in 1617, and Bromley achieved his desired promotion to the Midlands Circuit in 1616. Potts was given the keepership of Skalme Park by James in 1615, to breed and train the king's hounds. In 1618, he was given responsibility for "collecting the forfeitures on the laws concerning sewers, for twenty-one years".

Having played her part in the deaths of her mother, brother, and sister, Jennet Device may eventually have found herself accused of witchcraft. A woman with that name was listed in a group of 20 tried at Lancaster Assizes on 24 March 1634, although it cannot be certain that it was the same Jennet Device. The charge against her was the murder of Isabel Nutter, William Nutter's wife. In that series of trials the chief prosecution witness was a ten-year-old boy, Edmund Robinson. All but one of the accused were found guilty, but the judges refused to pass death sentences, deciding instead to refer the case to the king, Charles I. Under cross-examination in London, Robinson admitted that he had fabricated his evidence, but even though four of the accused were eventually pardoned, they all remained incarcerated in Lancaster Gaol, where it is likely that they died. An official record dated 22 August 1636 lists Jennet Device as one of those still held in the prison. These later Lancashire witchcraft trials were the subject of a contemporary play written by Thomas Heywood and Richard Brome, The Late Lancashire Witches.

In modern times the witches have become the inspiration for Pendle's tourism and heritage industries, with local shops selling a variety of witch-motif gifts. Burnley's Moorhouse's produces a beer called Pendle Witches Brew, and there is a Pendle Witch Trail running from Pendle Heritage Centre to Lancaster Castle, where the accused witches were held before their trial. The X43 bus route run by Burnley Bus Company has been branded The Witch Way, with some of the vehicles operating on it named after the witches in the trial. Pendle Hill, which dominates the landscape of the area, continues to be associated with witchcraft, and hosts a hilltop gathering every Halloween.

Scholar Catherine Spooner argues in an article for Hellebore magazine that with the 400-year anniversary of the Pendle witch trials, the notion of the witches as folk heroes caught the popular imagination. With new cultural productions revisiting the witches' story (Mary Sharratt's Daughters of the WItching Hill (2011) or Jeanette Winterson's The Daylight Gate (2012)), Spooner argues that the Pendle witches have been transformed from "folk devil to folk heroes", and that "their history has become a model of resistance for the disenchanted and disenfranchised".

A petition was presented to UK Home Secretary Jack Straw in 1998 asking for the witches to be pardoned, but it was decided that their convictions should stand. Ten years later another petition was organised in an attempt to obtain pardons for Chattox and Demdike. The later petition followed the Swiss government's pardon earlier that year of Anna Göldi, beheaded in 1782, thought to be the last person in Europe to be executed as a witch.

== Literary adaptations and other media ==
Victorian novelist William Harrison Ainsworth wrote a romanticised account of the Pendle witches: The Lancashire Witches, first published in 1849, is the only one of his 40 novels never to have been out of print. The British writer Robert Neill dramatised the events of 1612 in his novel Mist over Pendle, first published in 1951. The writer and poet Blake Morrison treated the subject in his suite of poems Pendle Witches, published in 1996. Poet Simon Armitage narrated a 2011 documentary on BBC Four, The Pendle Witch Child.

The novel Good Omens by Terry Pratchett and Neil Gaiman (later adapted for television) features several witch characters named after the original Pendle witches, including Agnes Nutter, a prophet burned at the stake, and her descendant Anathema Device. Gaiman confirmed the homage in a 2016 tweet.

The novel The Familiars (2019) by Stacey Halls includes historical figures as characters in a story that is based at the time of the Pendle witch trials. The story focusses on Fleetwood Shuttleworth, a noblewoman who becomes pregnant at the age of seventeen, and becomes involved in the trial of her midwife Alice Gray who is accused of witchcraft.

Daisy Chute and Rebecca Brewer wrote a stage musical based on the trials titled Coven. Directed by Miranda Cromwell, the musical is premiering in autumn 2025 at London's Kiln Theatre.

=== 2012 anniversary ===
Pendle Hill marked with the date 1612 on the 400th anniversary of the trials

Events to mark the 400th anniversary of the trials in 2012 included an exhibition, "A Wonderful Discoverie: Lancashire Witches 1612–2012", at Gawthorpe Hall staged by Lancashire County Council. The Fate of Chattox, a piece by David Lloyd-Mostyn for clarinet and piano, taking its theme from the events leading to Chattox's demise, was performed by Aquilon at the Chorlton Arts Festival.

A life-size statue of Alice Nutter, by sculptor David Palmer, was unveiled in her home village, Roughlee. In August, a world record for the largest group dressed as witches was set by 482 people who walked up Pendle Hill, on which the date "1612" had been installed in 400-foot-tall numbers by artist Philippe Handford using horticultural fleece. The Bishop of Burnley, the Rt Rev John Goddard, had objected to the appearance of the numerals, as what he saw as a "light-hearted" celebration of "injustice and oppression".

Publications in 2012 inspired by the trials include two novellas, The Daylight Gate by Jeanette Winterson and Malkin Child by Livi Michael. Blake Morrison published a volume of poetry, A Discoverie of Witches.

== See also ==
- Bideford witch trial
- Cunning folk
