= Malkin Tower =

Site related to the Lancashire witch trials of 1612

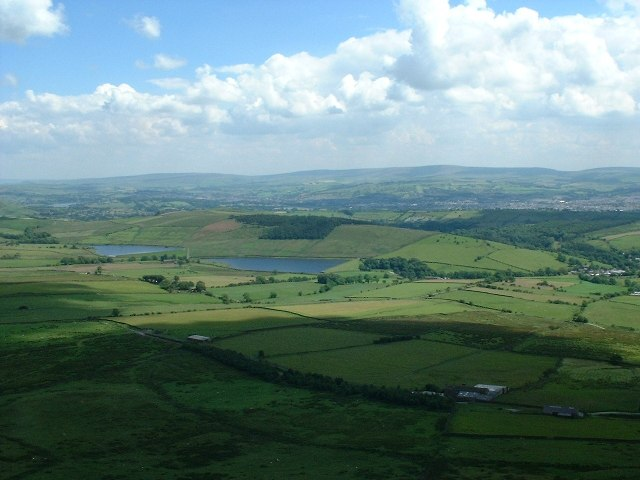
Lower Black Moss Reservoir (on the left), one of the suggested sites for the location of Malkin Tower

Malkin Tower (or the Malking Tower or Mocking Tower) was the home of Elizabeth Southerns, also known as Demdike, and her granddaughter Alizon Device, two of the chief protagonists in the Lancashire witch trials of 1612.

Perhaps the best-known alleged witches' coven in English legal history took place in Malkin Tower on 10 April 1612. (Note: All dates in this article are given in the Old Style consistent with the Julian Calendar in use in England until 1752, when the Gregorian calendar was adopted.) Eight of those attending were subsequently arrested and tried for causing harm by witchcraft, seven of whom were found guilty and executed. The house may have been demolished shortly after the trials. The only firm evidence for its location comes from the official account by the clerk of the court, Thomas Potts, who places it somewhere in the Forest of Pendle. Archaeological excavations in the area have failed to discover any confirmed remains of the building.

Several explanations have been suggested for the origins of the word Malkin. Despite its name, Malkin Tower is likely to have been a simple cottage.

== Toponymy ==
Malkin's Tower, a little cottage where
Reporte makes caitive witches meete to swear
Their homage to ye devil.

— Richard James c. 1633

The name Malkin has several possible derivations: it was a familiar form of the female names Mary or Maud, and a term for a poor or shabby woman; the similar mawkin was a word used to describe a lower-class woman or slut. Malkin was also used as a term for a cat, particularly an old cat, as in grimalkin or grey malkin, and was an old northern English name for a hare, into which witches were said to be able to transfigure. It has also been suggested that the name was a combination of mal and kin as a slight to the residents of Malkin Tower, which local historian Arthur Douglas considers unlikely owing to the poor education of people in the area at that time. Another possibility is a corruption of malt kiln, which is supported by a claim made by Alizon Device that the family of Anne Whittle, also known as Chattox, had broken into their fire house. (Note: A fire house was used in the final stage of converting barley into malt for use in brewing, by heating it up over a slow fire. The value of goods stolen from Demdike's fire house was about £1, equivalent to about £100 as of 2008.)

Authors have speculated on a range of buildings that could account for the Tower appellation. Malkin Tower may have incorporated a Norman peel tower, built as a defence against Scottish raiders or might have been a disused poacher's lookout, but it is more likely that despite its name Malkin Tower was a simple cottage. Historian W. R. Mitchell suggests that it was originally a small farm building, perhaps a shelter for fodder or livestock, which was converted into poor-quality living accommodation. Poverty was not uncommon among the residents of the Forest of Pendle, hence the building may have been no more than a hovel, and tower may have been a sarcastic name given by local residents. It is almost certain that Southerns and Device did not own Malkin Tower but were tenants.

Malkin Tower is sometimes alternatively referred to as Malking Tower, or Mocking Tower.

== Association with witches ==
On Good Friday, 10 April 1612, Malkin Tower was the venue for perhaps the best-known alleged witches' coven in English legal history. The house was home to Elizabeth Southerns, also known as Demdike, (Note: "Demdike" is derived from "devil woman", suggesting that Elizabeth Southerns was "feared and loathed within the community".) and her granddaughter Alizon Device, two of the alleged Pendle witches.

On 21 March 1612 Alizon had a chance encounter with John Law, a pedlar from Halifax, who refused to sell her some pins. Law collapsed shortly afterwards and his son accused Alizon of being responsible. She and her grandmother were summoned to the home of local magistrate, Roger Nowell, on suspicion of causing harm by witchcraft. Both were arrested and detained in Lancaster Gaol, along with two other women. Friends of the Demdike family met at Malkin Tower on 10 April 1612, allegedly to plot the escape of the four gaoled women by blowing up Lancaster Castle. Nowell learned of the meeting and, after interrogating Alizon Device's "mentally sub-normal" brother, James, concluded that Malkin Tower had been the scene of a witches' coven, and that all who had attended were witches. Eight were subsequently accused of causing harm by witchcraft and committed for trial, seven at Lancaster Assizes and one at York.

== Location ==
The location of Malkin Tower is uncertain. It may have been demolished shortly after the 1612 trials, as it was common at the time to dismantle empty buildings and recycle the materials. (Note: The building accommodated only Alizon Device and her grandmother; Alizon was hanged and her grandmother died in prison awaiting trial. The other members of the family lived in a smallholding that had belonged to John Device, Elizabeth Device's deceased husband.) The building may also have been destroyed to eradicate the "melancholy associations" of the place. The official account of the trials written by Thomas Potts, clerk to the court, in his The Wonderfull Discoverie of Witches in the Countie of Lancaster mentions Malking Tower many times, but only describes it as being in the Forest of Pendle, a former royal forest (Note: Pendle Forest was part of the Honour of Clitheroe, which was disafforested in 1507, although the land remained a part of the Duchy of Lancaster until 1660.) that covered a considerable area south and east of Pendle Hill, extending almost to the towns of Burnley, Colne and Padiham.

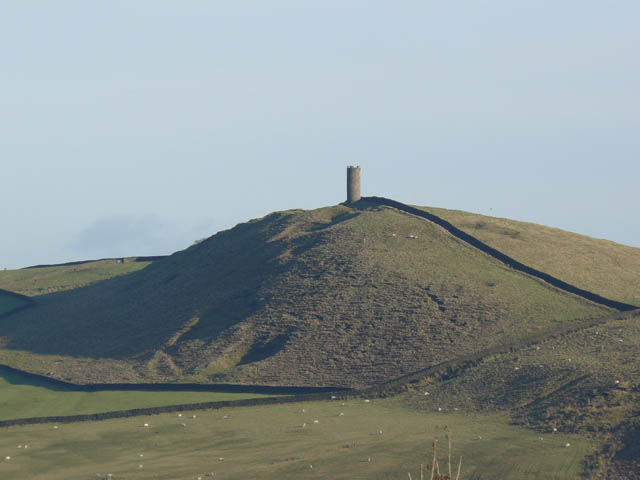
Stansfield Tower, Blacko, a Victorian folly often confused with Malkin Tower

One contender is in the civil parish of Blacko, on the site of present-day Malkin Tower Farm; since the 1840s claims have been made that old masonry found in a field wall is from the remains of the building. In The Lancashire Witch-Craze, Jonathan Lumby conjectures that the building was situated on the moors surrounding Blacko Hill, near to an old road between Colne and Gisburn. Local folklore in the parish holds that the remains of Malkin Tower are buried in a field behind the nearby Cross Gaits Inn public house; the tower used to be featured on the inn's sign. The primary evidence supporting this location seems to be that a hollow in the hillside east of the farm is known as Mawkin Hole. It has been suggested that this is the same place mentioned in the 16th-century halmote court records for the manor of Colne as Mawkin Yarde, (Note: Spelt variously: Malkynyerd, Malkenyerd, Malkynyerde, Mawkyn-yarde, Mawkin Yarde.) described as being "in the north of Colne", but anywhere inside the manor of Colne would have been outside the Forest of Pendle, and the first Ordnance Survey map of the area, created in the 1840s, identifies the farm as Blacko Tower. The site is also several miles from any of the traceable locations mentioned at the trial.

In 1891 local grocer Jonathan Stansfield constructed a solitary tower on the nearby summit of Blacko Hill. Today this is also commonly known as Blacko Tower, and is often confused with Malkin Tower. Although he claimed at the time that he wished to see into neighbouring valleys, historian John Clayton suggests that, aware of the story, he may have wished to provide the area with his own version.

Another possible location is somewhere near the village of Newchurch in Pendle. Douglas claims there is "persuasive" evidence that an area near Sadler's Farm (now known as Shekinah Christian Centre) was the site of Malkin Tower; there were numerous reports of alleged witchcraft in the area, and it was in the vicinity of other locations named during the trial such as Greenhead, (Note: Greenhead, near Fence, was the home of Christopher Nutter and his son Robert, for whose deaths Anne Whittle and Anne Redferne were charged with murder during the Pendle witch trials.) Barley and Roughlee. Others involved in the trials were known to have lived in the area; alleged witches Jane and John Bulcock resided at Moss End Farm in Newchurch, and John Nutter, whose cows were claimed to have been bewitched, lived at the neighbouring Bull Hole Farm. Southerns' son Christopher Holgate also lived nearby. But neither the deeds of Sadler's Farm, which date back to the 17th century, nor contemporary maps of the region mention Malkin Tower or any fields in which it may have stood.

Archaeological excavations have been undertaken in several locations in the Pendle Forest area, including Newchurch, but nothing has been found. A potential candidate for the lost Malkin Tower was announced in December 2011, after water engineers unearthed a 17th-century cottage with a mummified cat sealed in the walls, (Note: The spirits of dead cats were believed to protect household food supplies from vermin such as rats and mice.) close to Lower Black Moss reservoir near Barley.

== Bibliography ==
- Bennett, Walter (1993), The Pendle Witches, Lancashire County Books, ISBN 978-1-871236-27-9
- Catlow, Richard (1986), The Pendle Witches (3rd ed.), Hendon Publishing, ISBN 978-0-902907-82-9
- Clayton, John A. (2007), The Lancashire Witch Conspiracy (2nd ed.), Barrowford Press, ISBN 978-0-9553821-2-3
- Davies, Peter (1971) [1929], The Trial of the Lancaster Witches, Frederick Muller, ISBN 978-0-584-10921-4 (Facsimile reprint of Davies' 1929 book, containing the text of The Wonderfull Discoverie of Witches in the Countie of Lancaster by Potts, Thomas (1613))
- Davitt, Jacqueline (2006), Witches and Ghosts of Pendle and the Ribble Valley, Tempus, ISBN 978-0-7524-4063-7
- Douglas, Arthur (1978), The Fate of the Lancashire Witches, Countryside Publications, ISBN 978-0-86157-001-0
- Eyre, Kathleen (1986), Witchcraft in Lancashire (2nd ed.), Dalesman Books, ISBN 978-0-85206-854-0
- Farrer, William (1897), The Court Rolls of the Honor of Clitheroe in the County of Lancaster Vol 1, Emmott & Co, OCLC 557828341
- Fields, Kenneth (1998), Lancashire Magic and Mystery: Secrets of the Red Rose County, Sigma, ISBN 978-1-85058-606-7
- Froome, Joyce (2010), A History of the Pendle Witches and Their Magic: Wicked Enchantments, Palatine Books, ISBN 978-1-874181-62-0
- Hasted, Rachel A. C. (1993), The Pendle Witch Trial 1612, Lancashire County Books, ISBN 978-1-871236-23-1
- Lumby, Jonathan (1995), The Lancashire Witch-Craze, Carnegie, ISBN 978-1-85936-065-1
- Mitchell, W. R. (1984), The Lancashire Witches, Dalesman Books, ISBN 978-0-85206-776-5
- Peel, Edgar; Southern, Pat (1985), The Trials of the Lancashire Witches (3rd ed.), Hendon Publishing, ISBN 978-0-86067-099-5
- Poole, Robert, ed. (2002), The Lancashire Witches: Histories and Stories, Manchester University Press, ISBN 978-0-7190-6204-9
- Potts, Thomas (1845) [1613], Crossley, James (ed.), The Wonderfull Discoverie of Witches in the Countie of Lancaster, Chetham Society, OCLC 633674946
- Sharpe, James (2002), "Introduction: The Lancashire Witches in Historical Context", in Poole, Robert (ed.), The Lancashire Witches: Histories and Stories, Manchester University Press, ISBN 978-0-7190-6204-9
- Swain, John T. (1986), Industry Before the Industrial Revolution: North-east Lancashire, c. 1500–1640, Manchester University Press, ISBN 978-0-7190-1340-9
- Swain, John (2002), "Witchcraft, Economy and Society in the Forest of Pendle", in Poole, Robert (ed.), The Lancashire Witches: Histories and Stories, Manchester University Press, pp. 73–87, ISBN 978-0-7190-6204-9
