= Padiham witch =

Margaret Pearson convicted of witchcraft

Margaret Pearson, also known as the Padiham witch because she lived in the town of Padiham in Lancashire, England, was among those tried with the Pendle witches in the Lancashire witch trials of 1612. This, her third trial for witchcraft, took place on 19 August at Lancaster Assizes in front of Sir James Altham and Sir Edward Bromley.

One of the Pendle witches, Anne Whittle, also known as Chattox, had accused Pearson of "riding a mare ... to death", so she was charged with killing a horse. The only other evidence submitted against her came from a fellow resident of Padiham, Jennet Booth, who said that on a visit to Pearson's husband while Margaret was in prison a toad had jumped out of a pile of firewood. Found guilty of non-capital witchcraft Pearson escaped execution, and was instead sentenced to be pilloried in Lancaster, Clitheroe, Whalley and Padiham on four market days, followed by a year in prison. (Note: Pillorying and imprisonment was the usual punishment for those found guilty of witchcraft but who had not killed anyone.)
