= Thomas Potts (clerk) =

Clerk of the court in the Pendle witch trial (fl. 1612–1618)

Thomas Potts (fl. 1609-1616) was an English law clerk, and the author of The Wonderfull Discoverie of Witches in the Countie of Lancaster.

== Life ==
Thomas Potts was brought up under the care of Sir Thomas Knyvet, Lord Knyvet of Escrick. He adopted the legal profession, and resided from 1609 in Clifford’s Inn, an Inn of Chancery situated between Chancery Lane and Fetter Lane. In 1612 he went as clerk on circuit with Sir James Altham and Sir Edward Bromley, barons of the exchequer, and officiated at the trial of the famous Lancashire witches at Lancaster on 12 August. He died in 1616.

== Work ==
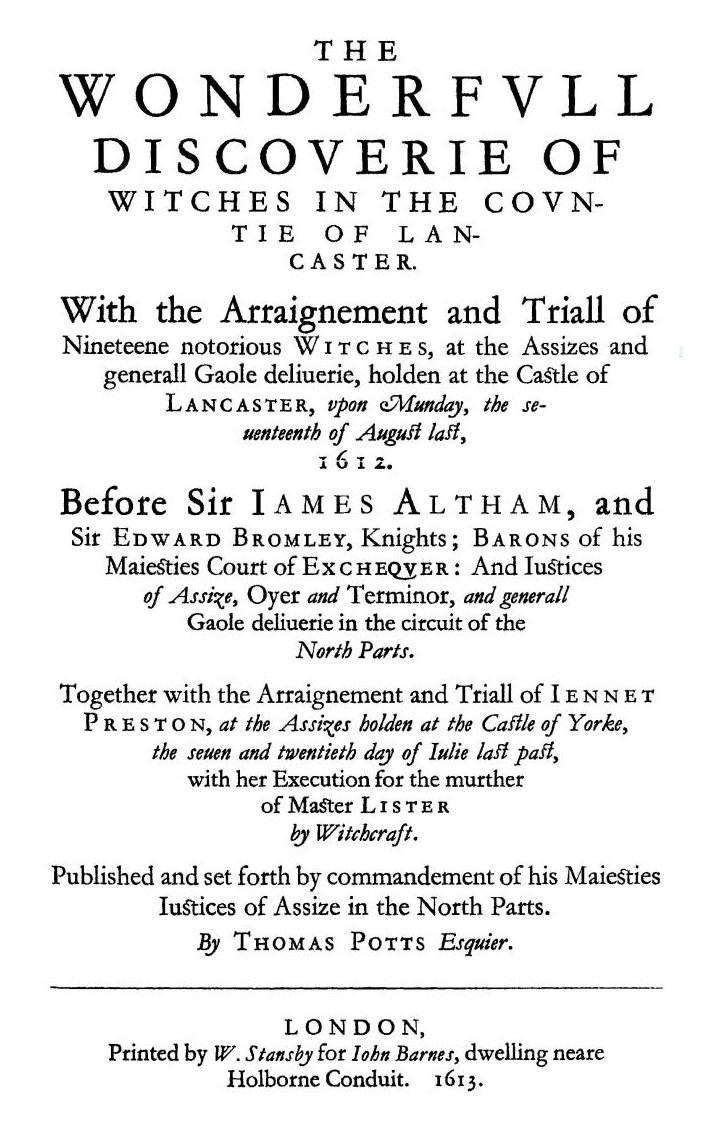
Title page, 1613

During the trial of the witches, at the judges' request he compiled an account of the proceedings, which Bromley corrected before publication. It appeared in the following year under the title The Wonderfull Discoverie of Witches in the Countie of Lancaster, London, 1613, 4to.

The Wonderfull Discoverie of Witches in the Countie of Lancaster; with the Arraignment and Triall of Nineteene notorious Witches, and the Assizes and generall Gaole deliverie, holden at the Castle of Lancaster, upon Munday the seventeenth of August last, 1612, before Sir James Altham, and Sir Edward Bromley, Knights, Barons of his Majesties Court of Exchequer, and Justices of Assize, Oyer and Terminer, and generall Gaole deliverie in the Circuit of the North Parts. Together with the Arraignment and Triall of Jennett Preston, at the Assizes holden at the castle of Yorke, the seven-and-twentieth day of Julie last past, with her execution for the murther of Master Lister, by witchcraft. / Published and set forth by commandement of his Majesties Justices of Assize in the North Parts. By Thomas Potts, Esquier. / London: Printed by W. Stansby, for John Barnes, dwelling near Holborne Conduit. / 1613.

In the dedication to Sir Thomas Knyvet, Potts speaks of it as the first fruit of his learning. The work was reprinted by Sir Walter Scott in Somers Tracts, 1810, and again by the Chetham Society in 1845, with an introduction by James Crossley. Scott refers to it in his Letters on Demonology and Witchcraft, and it furnished the groundwork of Harrison Ainsworth's Lancashire Witches, in which Potts is a prominent character.

== Sources ==
- Ainsworth, William Harrison (1854). The Lancashire Witches: A Romance of Pendle Forest. London: George Routledge & Co.
- Crossley, James, ed. (1845). Potts's Discovery of Witches in the County of Lancaster. (Chetham Society). Manchester: Charles Simms and Co. pp. iii–lxxix.
- Gowing, Laura (2004). "Pendle witches Lancashire witches (act. 1612)". Oxford Dictionary of National Biography (online ed.). Oxford University Press. doi:10.1093/ref:odnb/67763. (Subscription, Wikipedia Library access or UK public library membership required.)
- Green, Mary Anne Everett, ed. (1858). Calendar of State Papers, Domestic Series, of the Reign of James I, 1611–1618. London: Longman, Brown, Green, Longmans, & Roberts. p. 535.
- Hazlitt, William Carew (1867). Hand-book to the Popular, Poetical and Dramatic Literature of Great Britain. London: John Russell Smith. p. 325.
- Scott, Walter (1830). Letters on Demonology and Witchcraft. London: John Murray. pp. 249–250.
- Scott, Walter, ed. (1810). Somers Tracts: A Collection of Scarce and Valuable Tracts. Vol. 3. London: T. Cadell and W. Davies. pp. 95–160.

Attribution:

- This article incorporates text from a publication now in the public domain: Pollard, Albert Frederick (1896). "Potts, Thomas (fl.1612-1618)". In Lee, Sidney (ed.). Dictionary of National Biography. Vol. 46. London: Smith, Elder & Co. p. 228.
