= Letters on Demonology and Witchcraft =

1830 book by Sir Walter Scott

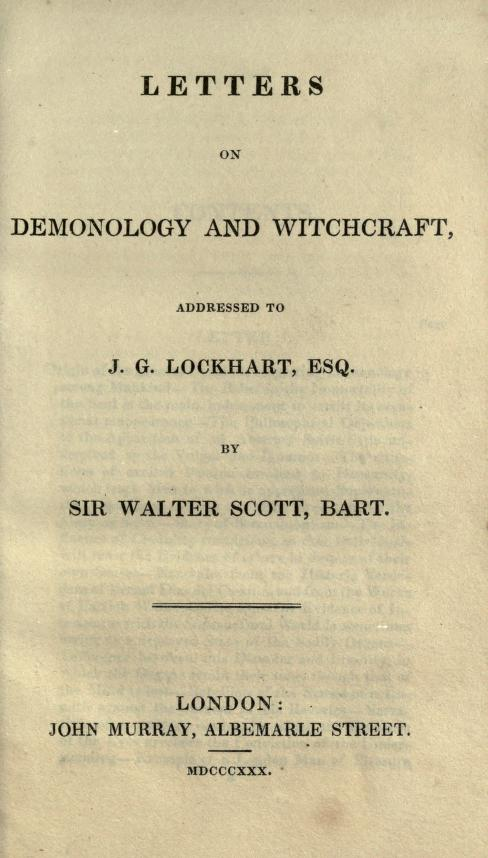
Title-page of the first edition

Letters on Demonology and Witchcraft Addressed to J. G. Lockhart, Esq. (1830) was a study of witchcraft and the supernatural by Sir Walter Scott. A lifelong student of folklore, Scott was able to draw on a wide-ranging collection of primary and secondary sources. His book found many readers throughout the 19th century, and exercised a significant influence in promoting the Victorian vogue for Gothic and ghostly fiction. Though on first publication it met with mixed reviews, it is now recognised as a pioneering work of scientific anthropology, treating of its subject in an acute and analytical way which prefigures later scholarship on the subject, as well as presenting a highly readable collection of supernatural anecdotes.

== Content ==
The book is divided into ten parts, each taking the form of a letter from the author to his son-in-law, J. G. Lockhart. This format allows Scott to write in an informal, discursive manner, enhancing the book's readability. He presents a wide survey of attitudes to demonology and witchcraft from Biblical times up to the 19th century, illustrating it with a large number of anecdotes of individual cases. He considers also the topics of ghosts, fairies, brownies, elves, second sight, and the mythologies of the various Germanic peoples. Belief in these phenomena is presented as the result of ignorance and prejudice, which was eventually dispersed by the rise of rationalist philosophy in the 18th century. Witchcraft prosecutions were, he points out, often directed against heretics and political undesirables. Throughout he treats his subjects in the analytical, rationalist manner to be expected of an heir of the Scottish Enlightenment.

== Composition ==
Scott's fascination with the supernatural stretched back to his childhood. In 1809 he had suggested to his friend Robert Surtees that they work together on a "system of Daemonology", and in 1812 he proposed to collaborate with Charles Kirkpatrick Sharpe on a collection of comic stories on the same subject. In 1823 he began a "dialogue on Popular Superstitions"; his publisher made an offer for him to expand it to book-length, but Scott thought the sum too little and abandoned the idea.

In 1830 Scott's position was entirely different. To pay off enormous debts he had for several years been writing volume after volume of fiction and non-fiction, to the detriment of his health. In February he suffered a stroke, inducing his son-in-law, J. G. Lockhart, to suggest he write a book on demonology rather than a more demanding three-volume novel. This promised to be, in John Sutherland's words, "the kind of roundabout essay on antiquarian themes which came as easily as talking to Scott". It was to be a contribution to the publisher John Murray's "Family Library", and the payment of £600 would be a sorely needed subvention for his personal expenses. He began on 21 March, but after three months work he was flagging. "I must do something better than these Daemonological trash", he wrote in his Journal. "It is nine o'clock, and I am weary, yea, my very spirit's tired." On 16 July he was able to record "I have finished the Daemonology and have a mind to say D—n it, but the subject is damnd to my hand", and by 22 July he had finished correcting the proofs.

== Publication ==
Letters on Demonology and Witchcraft was published on 14 September 1830, in time to take full advantage of the Christmas trade. From November 1830 copies were sold extra-illustrated with twelve engravings by George Cruikshank. Sales of the first edition were brisk enough to necessitate a second edition, published on 24 January 1831. In the following years translations appeared in Italian and Spanish, while two competing French translations were published in the 1830s. New editions of the Letters appeared at short intervals throughout the 19th century.

== Sources ==
Scott was in an unusually good position to write a book on demonology and witchcraft, since, as Lockhart reminded him, "You have a whole library de re magica [on the subject of magic] at Abbotsford", but he nevertheless had to call on his friends for help in finding much out-of-the-way material. Important sources for Scott's work include Samuel Hibbert's Sketches of the Philosophy of Apparitions, Robert Pitcairn's Criminal Trials and other Proceedings before the High Court of Justiciary in Scotland, Reginald Scot's Discoverie of Witchcraft, Robert Kirk's Essay on the Subterranean Commonwealth, Cotton Mather's Magnalia Christi, John Ferriar's "Of Popular Illusions and More Particularly of Modern Demonology", Thomas Jackson's Treatise Containing the Originall of Unbelief, and a host of primary sources in the form of anecdotes sent him by his correspondents, not to mention his own memories of personal experiences, such as buying a favourable wind from a witch in Orkney during a voyage he undertook in 1814. Scott was also able to draw on a large corpus of his own previous writings on matters supernatural.

== Reception ==
The first reaction to the publication of Scott's book came in a flurry of letters from readers wishing to inform him of obscure witches of the past or of the correspondent's own supernatural experiences. This was followed by the appearance of a number of treatises on kindred subjects, including Charles Upham's Lectures on Witchcraft (1831), David Brewster's Letters on Natural Magic (1832), and William Godwin's Lives of the Necromancers (1834). Scott's book has also been credited with provoking the long line of Victorian novels on necromantic themes that includes Harrison Ainsworth's The Lancashire Witches and Bram Stoker's Dracula.

Though the book was a rapid seller, its reception by the critics was mixed, some praising its sceptical attitude to the supernatural and some thinking it not sceptical enough. It was warmly praised by the Imperial Magazine, the Gentleman's Magazine, and the Literary Gazette; the Edinburgh Literary Journal and the Aberdeen Journal suggested the book was too philosophically lightweight; and Blackwood's Magazine criticised Scott's style and the inconsistencies of his argument.

When Lockhart came to write his biography of Scott (1837–1838) he dealt in a rather supercilious manner with the Letters on Demonology and Witchcraft, in which he saw clear signs of the author's recent stroke. He wrote that it:

contains many passages worthy of his best day – little snatches of picturesque narrative and the like – in fact, transcripts of his own familiar fireside stories. The shrewdness with which evidence is sifted on legal cases attests, too, that the main reasoning faculty remained unshaken. But, on the whole, [this work] can hardly be submitted to a strict ordeal of criticism. There is...a cloudiness both of words and arrangement.

And there was much half-hearted praise for this work in later Scott scholarship. Henry Morley wrote that "the old delight in anecdote and skill in story-telling...yet survived. It gave to Scott's Letters on Demonology and Witchcraft what is for us now a pathetic charm". For Andrew Lang it was "a work well worth reading, though marked by failing powers"; for John Buchan, a book "in no way to be despised, for, though the style and arrangement are sometimes confused, it is a delightful compendium of eerie tales drawn from his capacious memory"; for John Sutherland, "a readable work of popular anthropology". But in the field of social science it has been judged more enthusiastically, being recognised as a work ahead of its time, a trailblazing scientific study of witchcraft and the supernatural. Lewis Spence, for example, called the Letters

so many doors opening on the treasure-house of a lifetime's gleaning...nothing they contain in the richness of their hoard is more astonishing than the superior insight distinguishing the accompanying comment. The origins of human superstition, as then understood, are here set forth with a clearness and accuracy of method which for all time mapped out the direction which this department of the science of folklore was to take.
