= Nicholas Assheton =

Country squire and writer (1590–1625)

Nicholas Assheton (1590–1625), a country squire and writer who lived at Downham, Lancashire, near Clitheroe, is noteworthy on account of a brief diary which he left. It illustrates the character of the country life of that part of West Lancashire which is associated with the poet Edmund Spenser. Assheton belonged to a branch of the Assheton family of Middleton, in the same county, and was the son of Richard Assheton, of Downham.

== Life ==
He probably had his education at Clitheroe grammar school; he married Frances, daughter of Richard Greenacres, of Worston, near Downham; and he died 16 April 1625, leaving issue.

== Works ==
His journal, which extends from 2 May 1617 to 13 March 1619, records his intercourse with his tenants and neighbours, with all their 'businesses, sports, bickerings, carousings, and (such as it was) religion.' It includes some notices of James I's visit to Lancashire in August 1617, when the petition which originated the Book of Sports was presented to the king. The original journal has been lost. It was first printed by Thomas Dunham Whitaker in his History of Whalley. It was next edited in 1848 by Francis Robert Raines, in vol. xiv of the Chetham Society series, from the third or 1818 edition of Whalley, with notes and an account of the Assheton family. In 1876 the diary was re-edited in the fourth edition of Whalley, ii.122-142.

== In literature ==
Harrison Ainsworth introduced Assheton into his novel Lancashire Witches, book ii, chap, iii, as "a type of the Lancashire squire of the day"; but both Whitaker and the novelist were mistaken in considering him a Puritan.
