= William Methold =

English-born judge

Sir William Methold (or Methwold) (c. 1560–1621) was an English-born judge in seventeenth-century Ireland, who held office as Chief Baron of the Irish Exchequer.

== History ==
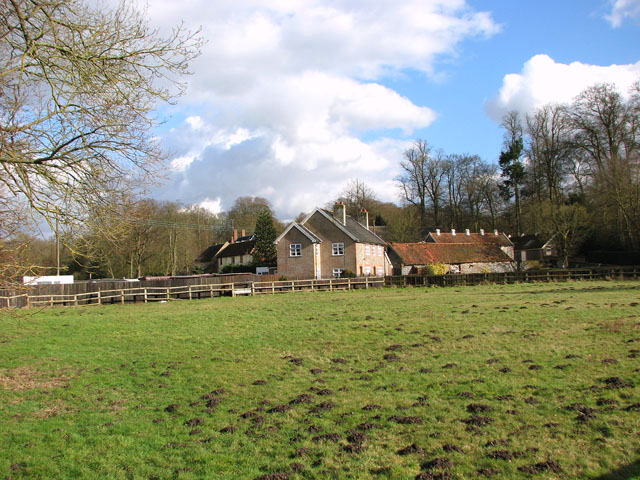
Rushford, Norfolk, a former royal manor, which the Methold family acquired by marriage into the Alington family

He was born in Norfolk, eldest of the three sons of William Methold or Methwold (died 1586), of Rushford, and his wife Susanna Alington, daughter of George Alington or Alyngton of Swinhope, Lincolnshire. His maternal grandmother was Ann Cheke, daughter of Peter Cheke, and sister of Sir John Cheke, tutor to King Edward VI. Cheke received a grant of Rushford, which was originally a royal manor, from the King, and quickly leased it to Alington, from whom it passed to the Metholds.

He was educated at Lyon's Inn and Lincoln's Inn. He was called to the Bar in 1589, became a serjeant-at-law c. 1612, and was made a Bencher of Lincoln's Inn in 1608. He was knighted and sent to Ireland as Chief Baron of the Irish Exchequer in 1612, an office he held until his death. He was appointed joint Keeper of the Great Seal of Ireland in 1619. He joined the King's Inn in the same year. He is buried in Christ Church Cathedral, Dublin.

== Family ==
He married Margaret Southwell, one of the many daughters of John Southwell of Barham, Suffolk and Margaret Crofts. The marriage created a useful family link with Sir Thomas Richardson, the future Lord Chief Justice, who married Margaret's sister Ursula.

They had one daughter, Elizabeth, who married in 1608 Thomas Potts, Master of the Harriers (Hare-hounds) to James I. After her husband's death, Elizabeth Potts was left in a state of great poverty, and as a result she was granted a government pension in 1655. William Methold's widow Margaret remarried Sir Thomas Rotherham, Mayor of Galway, member of the Privy Council of Ireland and MP for Tuam in the Irish Parliament of 1634-5. She died in 1640; Rotherham outlived her and probably died in 1646. Methold was the uncle of William Methwold, the noted colonial administrator.

== Character ==
Elrington Ball states that Methold was noted for his severity in enforcing the penal laws against Roman Catholics, and for his determination to exclude Catholics from any role in public life. The latter is demonstrated by his speech at a banquet, where he berated Dublin Corporation for the refusal of many of the aldermen to swear the Oath of Supremacy. Crawford, in a much more favourable sketch of his character, praises him as an exceptionally able, energetic and dependable judge who was diligent in going on assize (which many Irish judges found an ordeal to be avoided as far as possible), and who was conscientious in referring difficult cases to the Court of Castle Chamber, the Irish equivalent of Star Chamber. Sir Arthur Chichester, the Lord Deputy of Ireland, concerned at rumours that the Crown was planning to remove Methold, praised him as "an honest man".

Woolrych notes that despite his impressive achievements he remains a rather shadowy figure, and that we lack any of those colourful anecdotes, of the kind in which the legal profession delights, which would bring his character to life.
