= The Lancashire Witches =

Novel by William Harrison Ainsworth

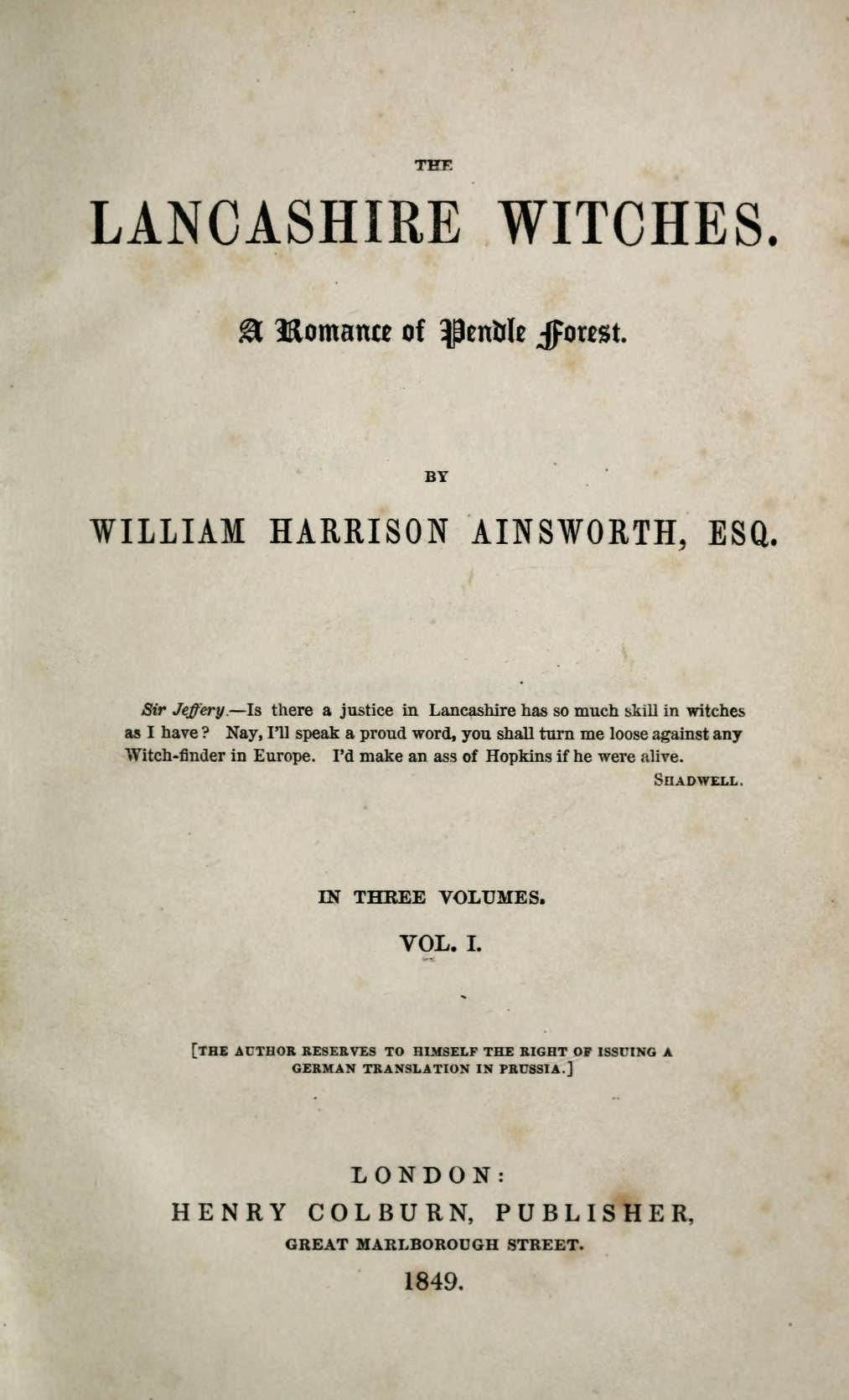
- Author: William Harrison Ainsworth
- Illustrator: John Gilbert
- Set in: Lancashire, 1612
- Publisher: Henry Colburn, Routledge (illustrated edition)

The Lancashire Witches is the only one of William Harrison Ainsworth's forty novels that has remained continuously in print since its first publication. It was serialised in the Sunday Times newspaper in 1848; a book edition appeared the following year, published by Henry Colburn. The novel is based on the true story of the Pendle witches, who were executed in 1612 for causing harm by witchcraft. Modern critics such as David Punter consider the book to be Ainsworth's best work. E. F. Bleiler rated the novel as "one of the major English novels about witchcraft".

== Biographical background and publication ==
The subject of the Pendle witches was suggested to Ainsworth by antiquarian and long-time friend James Crossley, President of the Chetham Society. During 1846 and 1847 Ainsworth visited all of the major sites involved in the story, such as Pendle Hill and Malkin Tower, home of the Demdikes, one of the two families accused of witchcraft. He wrote the story in 1848, when it was serialised in the Sunday Times newspaper. On completion of the work, Ainsworth was paid £1,000 (equivalent to £103,000 in 2025 (Note: UK Consumer Price Index inflation figures from 1209–2024 based on data from "Inflation calculator", Bank of England, London, 18 February 2026)) and the copyright reverted to him.

As was common practice at the time, the novel was published in a three-volume set known as a triple decker. The first edition was produced by Henry Colburn in 1849, with the subtitle "A Romance of Pendle Forest". At £1 11s 6d, about the amount that a skilled worker could earn in a week, it was expensive. Routledge published an illustrated edition in 1854, reissued in 1878. The twelve full-page illustrations were by John Gilbert.

== Plot ==
Ainsworth based his story largely on the official account of the Lancashire witch trials written by the clerk to the court, Thomas Potts, first published in 1613 under the title The Wonderfull Discoverie of Witches in the Countie of Lancaster. Potts himself makes an appearance in the book, as a "scheming and self-serving lawyer". (Note: In reality Potts was never a lawyer.) The novel consists of four parts, each written as a third-person narrative.

=== Introduction ===
The ten chapters of the Introduction, subtitled "The Last Abbot of Whalley", are set against the backdrop of the 1536 Pilgrimage of Grace, an uprising by northern Catholics against the English Reformation instituted by King Henry VIII.

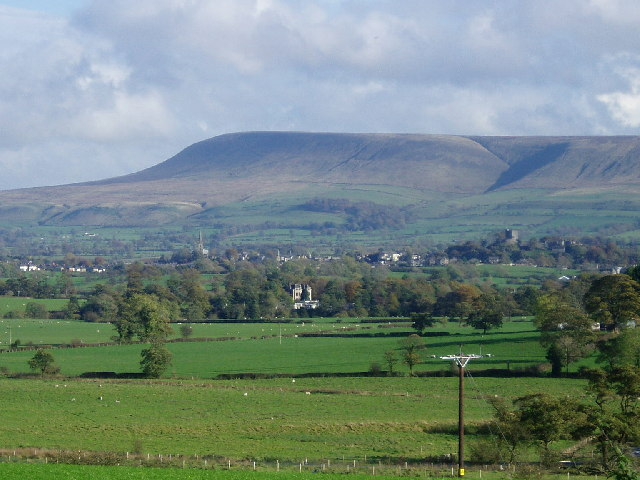
Pendle Hill

It is late November 1536. Eight men, prominent among them John Paslew, Abbot of Whalley and the self-styled Earl of Poverty, are gathered together by a beacon at the top of Pendle Hill. An uneasy armistice has been declared in the Pilgrimage, and beacons have been built on high ground to act as a renewed summons to arms should they ever be lit; that is the signal the eight men are waiting for.

As dusk approaches the abbot and his party become aware of a tall dark man accompanied by a black hound standing close by, whom one of the party recognises as Nicholas Demdike, husband of Bess Demdike, "an approved and notorious witch". Demdike starts to sing, mocking the abbot and foretelling of his execution, which so enrages the abbot that he orders one of his archers to loose a shot at him. But Demdike merely laughs before disappearing down the hill, only pausing about half-way down to trace a circle in the grass and repeat some incantation.

In the growing darkness a signal fire is seen on a neighbouring hill, then another and another. Excitedly the abbot lights the beacon on Pendle Hill and prepares to ride to Whalley Abbey, to organise his forces in preparation for joining the main body of the rebel army the following day. But before he can leave, Demdike appears before him, to warn the abbot that if he proceeds with his plan his life will be forfeit. Demdike claims that he can save the abbot however, on one condition: that he baptise Demdike's infant daughter. Meanwhile a party of Royalist soldiers is ascending the hill in search of the abbot and his men, but Demdike conjures up a torrent of water from the spot where he had earlier traced the circle, and most of the soldiers are carried to their deaths. But still the abbot refuses to acquiesce to Demdike's request for his daughter to be baptised.

==== Capture and escape ====
The abbot is subsequently captured by Royalist forces, tried at Lancaster Castle, and sentenced to death by hanging. He is condemned to be executed outside his family home of Wishall Hall, close to the abbey, where he is taken the day before the sentence is due to carried out. As the abbot and his guards are entering the abbey he is once again confronted by Nicholas Demdike, this time accompanied by his wife Bess and their unbaptised infant. Demdike repeats his request to the abbot that he baptise the child, promising that if he does so then Demdike can still save him even at this late juncture. But the abbot continues to refuse, saying to Bess "I curse thee witch ... May the malediction of Heaven and all its hosts alight on the head of thy infant ... A thing accursed, and shunned by her fellows, shall thy daughter be – evil reputed and evil doing".

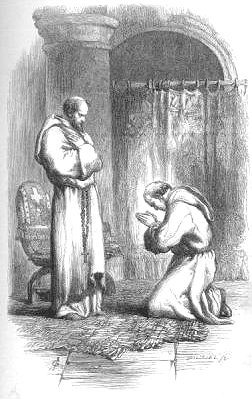
Borlace Alvetham hearing the abbot's confession

After a specially granted Midnight Mass, the abbot is overcome by remorse for his treatment thirty-one years earlier of a rival for the position of head of the abbey, Borlace Alvetham, and asks that a priest be sent to hear his confession. The abbot confesses that he had contrived to have Alvetham falsely accused of witchcraft and bricked into a tiny cell from which the only escape was death. The priest then throws back his hood to reveal that he is Borlace Alvetham, and that he had succeeded in escaping from his tomb with the aid of a demon. He further reveals that the demon promised him vengeance against his enemy, the abbot, and that when he returned to the area of Whalley twenty-nine years after his escape he had adopted the name of Nicholas Demdike.

Following his revelations Demdike rushes out of the room shouting "To the gallows! – to the gallows!", leaving the abbot to his own thoughts. He is roused when Hal o' Nabs, one of a group of men intent on rescuing the abbot, places a hand on his shoulder. But the abbot has given his word to his captors not to escape in return for being allowed to celebrate the Midnight Mass, and so refuses to follow the man down the ladder by which he had ascended. He is nevertheless tricked into escaping, and taken to the abbey mill. Inside he finds the miller's wife with an infant on her knee. She explains that the child is not hers, but was brought to her by her husband following the death of Bess Demdike that afternoon, so distraught was she at the abbot's curse. She shows the disfigured child to the abbot; one of its eyes is set lower than the other.

==== Execution ====
The abbot is quickly recaptured, thanks largely to Demdike. Shortly before the time for the death sentence to be carried out the following morning, the appointed executioner and his assistants disappear, because, it is suggested, they are reluctant to put churchmen to death. Demdike offers to take the executioner's place, and his offer is accepted. Moments before the appointed time, Demdike whispers to the abbot that he can spare him the indignity of a public execution by stabbing him to death if he would but retract the curse he had put on his daughter. The abbot's response is "Never ... thy child shall be a witch, and the mother of witches". Following his execution the abbot's body is entrusted to Demdike to be taken to the convent church. One of the abbot's erstwhile rescuers, Hal o' Nabs, has been warned that Demdike is impervious to all weapons forged by man, and so to wreak his revenge for the death of the abbot he secretes himself behind a great stone statue of St Gregory in the gallery of the church, waiting for Demdike to appear below it. When he does, Hal pushes the statue from its pedestal and it falls on Demdike, crushing him and killing him instantly.

=== Book The First ===
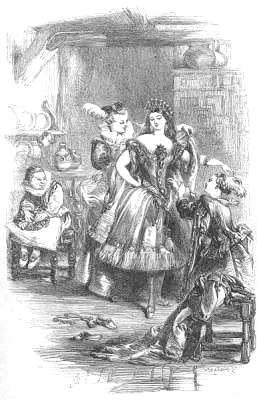
Alizon Device being dressed for her appearance as the Queen of May, while her sister Jennet looks on

In the ten chapters of the first book, subtitled "Alizon Device", the novel has moved on more than sixty years.

The village of Whalley has been decorated for a May Day wake. In a cottage on the outskirts of the village, Alizon Device is being dressed as Maid Marion, Queen of May, ready to take her place of honour in the pageant which will soon be arriving at her door. She is a beautiful young woman, in stark contrast to her little sister Jennet, nine or ten years old, who is watching the preparations in a sullen silence. Jennet is small for her age, with sharp and cunning features. She also has several deformities, including a curvature of the spine and eyes that are positioned unevenly on her face. The two sisters are grandchildren of Nicholas and Bess Demdike's unbaptised child, now known as Mother Demdike. (Note: The Demdike family tree is poetic licence on Ainsworth's part. The real Mother Demdike was Elizabeth Southerns; her nickname of Demdike is a derivation of "demon woman".) In the intervening years since the Abbot of Whalley's curse she has indeed become a witch, feared throughout the district.

As the procession reaches the village green the usher announces the arrival of Sir Ralph Assheton and his party. He is the great-grandson of the Richard Assheton who had led the group of men up Pendle Hill to apprehend the Abbot of Whalley, and almost been killed by the torrent of water conjured up by Nicholas Demdike. Fourteen years after that November evening he had bought Whalley Abbey from the Crown. Among Assheton's party are two of his cousins, Nicholas Assheton of Downham and Richard Assheton of Middleton. Richard, accompanied by his younger sister Dorothy, is about twenty-two years old and considered to be very handsome. Also among Sir Ralph's guests are Alice Nutter and local magistrate Roger Nowell. Alice Nutter is dressed in mourning clothes for her husband Richard, who had been suddenly taken ill and died an unexplained death within three or four days. Richard Nutter was convinced that he had been bewitched, and some locals believed that Alice had picked up a wax image in her husband's room, stuck with pins, and that when she had thrown it on the fire Richard had died. Alice has been persuaded from her secluded life at Rough Lee because she wishes to secure the help of Sir Ralph in a dispute she is having with her neighbour Roger Nowell over the boundary between their two estates. Sir Ralph, having been appointed umpire in the dispute, has already ruled in favour of Nowell, but as Alice has refused to accept his decision a lawyer has been summoned from London to give a final decision, Thomas Potts, who is also at the fair. Potts is also acting for another member of the local gentry, Sir Thomas Metcalfe, "a man of violent disposition", who is claiming ownership of a neighbouring house and estate.

Alizon is formally presented to Sir Ralph and Lady Assheton, and asked to choose her partner for the evening's dance to be held at the abbey. Blushing, she chooses Richard Assheton, who declares himself to be delighted by her choice, and asks if he may have the flower she is wearing as a token. Lady Assheton is quick to spot the mutual attraction between Alizon and Richard, which makes her a little uneasy. But the usher then leads Alizon to the maypole, where the festivities begin in earnest. Shortly thereafter Alizon becomes aware of a commotion some distance away, and on hearing that it is being caused by a swordfight between Richard and Sir Thomas Metcalfe, and fearful that Richard might be killed, she falls to the ground in a faint. But Richard is easily able to disarm his opponent, and, on the orders of Sir Ralph, Alizon is taken to the abbey to recover.

Meanwhile Alice Nutter and Nicholas have fallen into conversation about Mother Demdike. Nicholas is quite convinced that she is responsible for the death of Alice's husband, but Alice disagrees, and goes so far as to say that she does not believe in the existence of witches. Nicholas is adamant however, claiming that "Pendle Forest swarms with witches ... the terror of the whole country". Their conversation is overheard by Thomas Potts, and it gives him the idea to search out the witches that Nicholas refers to, and by so doing gain favour with King James, who is well known to have an interest in witchcraft.

==== Mother Chattox ====
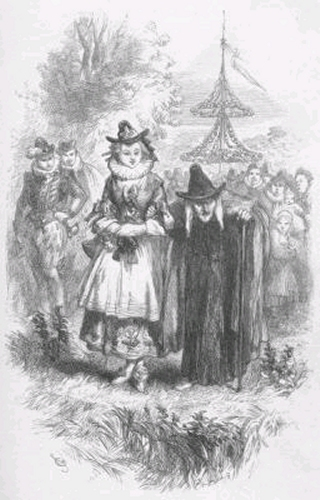
Mother Chattox and her daughter Nan Redferne

The revellers make their way to the church. Richard Assheton goes in first, and unwittingly stands on the grave of John Paslew, the last Abbot of Whalley. His cousin Nicholas is much alarmed when he sees Richard in that position, reminding him of the common belief that any Assheton who stands on the grave will be dead within the year, but Richard is unconcerned.

Nicholas and Richard leave the church, and see the arrival of Mother Chattox – Mother Demdike's "rival potentate in evil" – accompanied by her grand-daughter Nan Redferne. Under questioning from Nicholas, Mother Chattox admits that she hates all Asshetons. She places curses on both Nicholas and Richard, in the latter's case that "the bloom shall shall fade from his cheek ... the strength depart from his limbs. Sorrow shall be her portion who loves him".

Unnerved by this encounter, Nicholas calls for the beagle to arrest Mother Chattox as a witch, but she has disappeared, and Nan is arrested instead, on the same charge. Potts appears on the scene, and insists that Nan be detained until she has been tested as a witch. She is placed on a set of scales and weighed against a bible, but not satisfied with the result Potts insists on an ordeal by swimming. While she is being bound for her ordeal a mole is discovered on her breast, a witch's mark according to Potts. Nance is thrown into the River Calder attached to two ropes, one on each bank. Initially she floats, but when the tension is eased out of the ropes she sinks to the bottom of the river like a stone, thus passing the test. But nobody attempts to save her from drowning until Richard Assheton dives in and rescues her.

Some time later Alizon Device and Richard Assheton's sister Dorothy are strolling together through the grounds of the ruined abbey. Dorothy declares that she is so fond of Alizon that she would like her to come and stay with the Assheton family at their home in Middleton, but Alizon says that she must turn down the offer, as she feels a responsibility towards her mother and sister to encourage them back into the ways of the church. She goes on to say that she feels a particular responsibility towards her sister Jennet, and fervently hopes to be the agent of her salvation and save her soul. Dorothy then shares her fear that because Mother Demdike is widely believed to be a witch, the same accusation might be made about the members of her family, and that Alizon may suffer the same fate as Nan Redferne. She goes on to say that as Alizon is so different from the rest of her family that she and Richard both suspect that Alizon is not Elizabeth Device's daughter, or related to any of the Demdike clan.

Just then Mother Chattox appears in front of the two young women and proclaims herself the enemy of all of Mother Demdike's "accursed brood". Chattox says that because of Jem Device's treatment of her grand-daughter Nan Redferne during the trial by water she would have killed Alizon on the spot, had she not known that Alizon was indeed not Elizabeth Device's daughter and therefore not a Demdike. Although Chattox claims to know the secret of Alizon's birth, she says the time is not yet ripe for it to be revealed. Alice Nutter appears on the scene, demanding to know what Chattox has told the two girls. Chattox is evasive, but Alice is insistent that she reveals the identity of Alizon's real mother and casts a spell over her. Alice clearly has considerable power over Chattox, but the latter manages to shuffle off behind a tomb before she is forced to reveal her secret.

After returning to the abbey Dorothy reveals to her brother, who has guessed that Alizon is not Elizabeth Device's daughter, her surmise that Alizon is in reality Alice Nutter's daughter. Nicholas Assheton then joins them, telling them that Potts has just told him that he suspects Alice of being a witch after overhearing a conversation she had had with Elizabeth Device.

==== Alice Nutter ====
Meanwhile Alice Nutter has taken Alizon to her room in the abbey, so that they can have a private conversation. Alice reveals that she and her husband Richard had a very unhappy marriage, and that he had become exceedingly jealous, suspecting that Alice was having an affair with a family friend. Consequently, when Alice became pregnant Richard was convinced that the child was not his. Elizabeth Device, who at the time was employed as Alice's lady's maid, had given birth to her own child two months before Alice's daughter, whom she named Millicent. One night shortly after Millicent's birth Richard Nutter and Jem Device had burst into Alice's bedroom, grabbed the baby and thrown it on the fire. But the child they had killed was Elizabeth's, and not Alice's, as Elizabeth had swapped the babies over. Millicent is sent to live with Elizabeth Device as her own child, and given the name Alizon.

Alice tells Alizon that she will be coming to stay with her at Rough Lee, and will not be returning to what until now had been her home with Elizabeth Device. By now it has become dark. Swiftly, Alice rises and makes a few passes of her hands over her daughter, at which Alizon falls back as though in a faint, yet still remains conscious. She becomes aware of the tall dark figure of a man emerging from the closet; the last thing she sees before losing consciousness is Alice prostrating herself before the sinister-looking figure.

Just before the evening's dance is due to begin, Alice and Alizon join the main party in the abbey's gallery. Alice announces that she intends to adopt Alizon, having no children of her own. Keen to bring as many witches as possible to justice, Thomas Potts seeks out Jennet Device and promises her that she can make her fortune from the reward she will receive if she testifies against the other members of her family, including Alizon, and denounces them as witches. But before Jennet can give a proper reply Alice Nutter casts a spell over her, and she falls back faint.

==== Witches' Sabbath ====
Dorothy Assheton's room, known as the Abbot's Chamber, is next to that of Alizon and her mother. Having heard tales of ghostly apparitions, Dorothy is afraid to spend the night alone in her room, and begs Alizon to sleep with her, but Alizon dare not leave her mother. After a short time Alizon hears a tapping at her door. It is a white-faced Dorothy, who has been terrified by the sight of a monk dressed in white emerging from behind the wall hangings and gliding into the oratory. Alice tells Dorothy that she must be mistaken, and to return to bed. But as the clock strikes twelve Dorothy sees another figure behind the hangings, this time a woman dressed in white, and once again seeks refuge in the room next door. Entering without knocking, she finds the room in darkness and Alizon asleep in a chair, but no sign of Alice until the same figure of the woman dressed in white she had seen in her own room appears from behind a tapestry. Alice's "livid and contorted countenance" horrifies Dorothy, who manages to hide in a closet.

Alice takes two bottles from a small box she is carrying. One contains a sparkling liquid, the other a greenish unguent. She drinks a few drops of the bright liquid before anointing her face and hands with the unguent, chanting "Emen hetan" repeatedly as she does so, before leaving the room. Curious about the liquid she had seen Alice take, Dorothy tries a few drops herself, and is instantly overcome by a "bewildering excitement". Having felt the effect of the potion herself, and wondering if it might have the power to rouse Alizon from her sleep, she rubs a few drops on Alizon's lips. Almost at once Alizon awakes, almost as excited as Dorothy. Together the pair make their way down to the garden and towards the ruined conventual church. When the girls get close to the church they hear the hubbub of a witches' Sabbath, and hiding behind two columns to observe proceedings they learn that tonight a new witch is to be introduced into the group.

Alice Nutter appears to be in charge of proceedings, and is treated with great deference by the other witches present. The voice of a demon is heard as if coming from the bowels of the earth, demanding that if they want his help then the price to be paid is that a new witch is baptised. At that, Jennet Device is brought forward, but her mother Elizabeth rushes forward and strongly objects that Jennet is too young to be baptised a witch. Ignoring her mother, Jennet asks what she must do to become a witch. "You must renounce all hopes of heaven ... and devote yourself to Satan" replies Alice Nutter. On hearing those words Alizon rushes from her hiding place and goes to Jennet, asking the child to leave with her and be saved. But the demon insists on having a new convert, so Alice calls for Dorothy Assheton, who, still under the influence of the potion she had taken earlier, scarcely knows what is happening to her. Alice asks her if she is willing to become a witch, and Dorothy agrees that she is. But before the formal ceremony can be performed Alizon rushes to her, and forcing her to her knees begins to pray. With that, the witches flee.

=== Book The Second ===
The second book, subtitled "Pendle Forest", consists of 17 chapters.

There is no sign of the events of the previous evening when the party assembles to visit the boundary between the estates belonging to Alice Nutter and Roger Newell to settle their dispute. They take a detour on their way to pick up Roger Nowell, which results in them having to pass through a narrow glen, where they are attacked by invisible foes. Pressing on, they reach the village of Sabden, which they find to be in a woeful state. The villagers complain that they have been bewitched by Mother Chattox and Mother Demdike because they had refused to supply the witches with poultry, eggs, milk and other things they had demanded. Taking a great interest in the case, Thomas Potts promises the villagers that they will soon be rid of "these pestilent witches".

Continuing on their way, the party is joined by a man riding a powerful black horse. Much to their surprise he looks and sounds exactly like the lawyer Thomas Potts. He introduces himself as one of the reeves of the forest of Blackburnshire, sent by Alice Nutter as a witness to the boundary examination. To add to their amazement he says that his name is also Thomas Potts. After passing over one of the ridges of Pendle Hill they encounter an agitated cowherd, who tells them that a pedlar named John Law has collapsed in a fit and will die without their assistance. From the look of the pedlar, Nicholas Assheton believes him to have suffered from a paralytic stroke, but the man himself is convinced that he has been bewitched by Mother Demdike, because he had refused to give her the scissors and pins she had asked him for. After taking Law to a hostelry in the nearby village of Goldshaw, the party rests for a while and takes some refreshment.

Wandering around the village alone, Richard enters the churchyard and sees the sexton in conversation with Mother Chattox. He overhears Chattox ordering the sexton to bury a clay image of Alizon Device with the words "Bury it deep, and as it moulders away, may she it represents pine and wither". Richard rushes forward and seizes the image, throwing it to the ground and smashing it, but Chattox succeeds in making good her escape before he can apprehend her.

=== Boundary inspection ===
Pressing on, the party arrive at the boundary of Roger Nowell's estate. He is armed with his own map while Sir Ralph Assheton has one provided by Alice Nutter. To Nowell's increasing frustration, several large boulders and a stream marking the extremities of his property are not where he knows them to be, and as there are no signs of them having been moved he voices his suspicion that Alice Nutter has used witchcraft to win her boundary dispute with him.

Encouraged by Thomas Potts, Nowell determines to arrest Alice Nutter and the other alleged witches in the area – Mother Demdike and Mother Chattox along with their families. Richard and Nicholas Assheton baulk at Nowell's accusation of witchcraft against Alice Nutter, as it seems to them to be based on Nowell's bad grace in not accepting the evidence of his own eyes in his dispute with her. Consequently they leave the group and ride ahead to Alice Nutter's home in Rough Lee to warn her and to help defend her against Nowell and his remaining men. When Nowell arrives at Rough Lee he finds Alice Nutter in defiant mood and the gates to her property locked. She refuses to allow the men to enter, so some of them climb over the wall, only to find themselves attacked by her dogs. They beat a hasty retreat, before Alice Nutter appears at the gate and proposes that she and Roger Nowell have a private meeting to see if they can come to a mutual understanding. Nowell agrees, and Alice leads him to a small room off the main hall of the house.

Once they are alone, Alice demands that Nowell retract his accusation of witchcraft against her and tells Sir Ralph Assheton that he was mistaken about the boundary between their land, in return for which she offers to give the disputed land to Nowell without charge. Suspecting some kind of trickery, Nowell at first does not agree. Alice then conjures up a double of the magistrate, telling him that if he persists then she will have him incarcerated for the rest of his life, and send the double out in his place. Realising now that he has no choice, Nowell agrees to Alice's terms, to which she binds him by making him repeat the words "May I become subject to the Fiend if I fail in my promise".

=== Book The Third ===
Subtitled "Hoghton Tower".
