= Alice Nutter (alleged witch) =

English woman accused of witchcraft (died 1612)

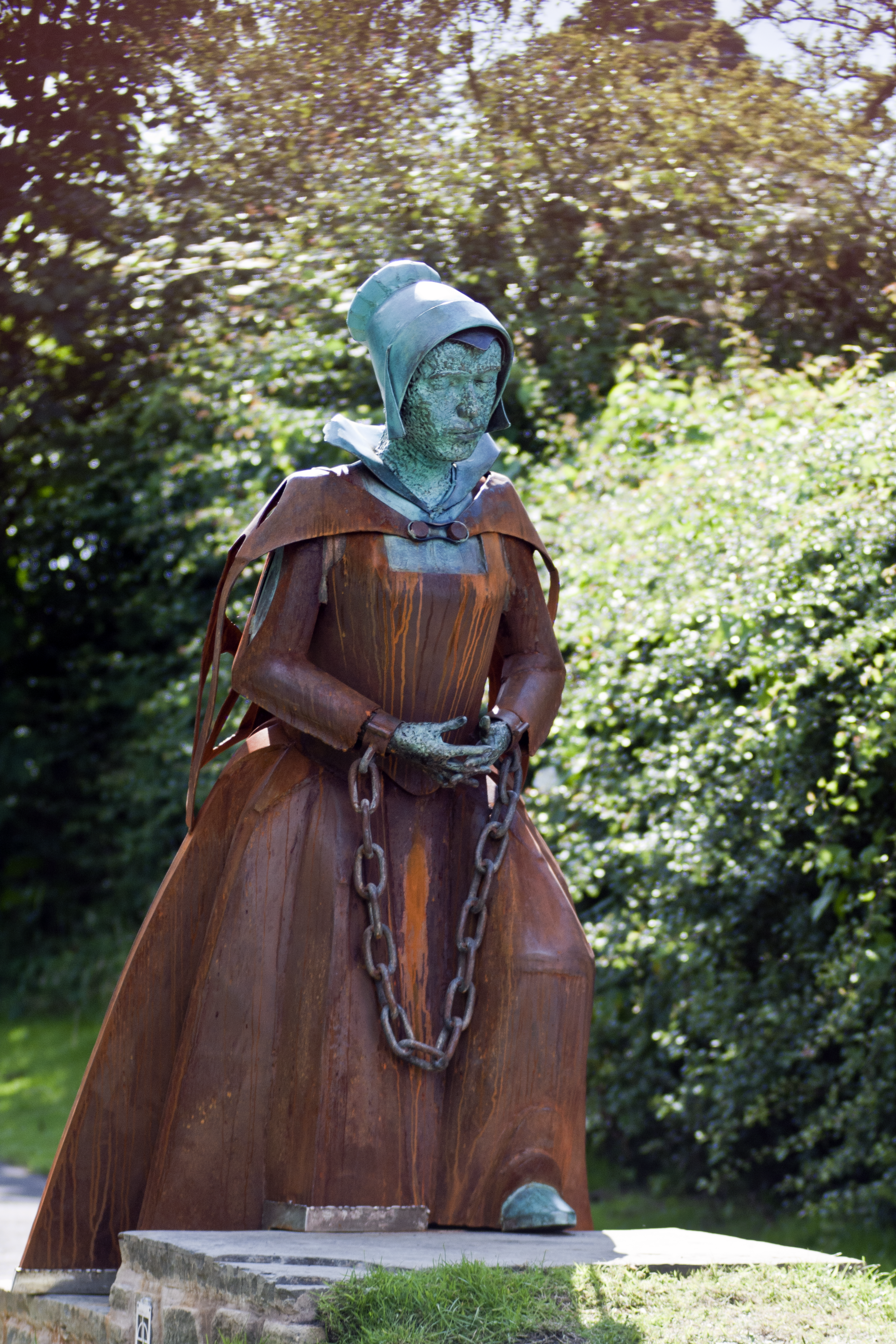
- Statue of Alice in Roughlee, Lancashire
- Born: c. 1560s Roughlee, Kingdom of England
- Died: 20 August 1612; Gallows Hill, Lancaster, Kingdom of England
- Cause of death: Hanged
- Known for: Accused as a Pendle witch
- Spouse: Richard Nutter

Alice Nutter (died 20 August 1612) was an English noblewoman accused and hanged as a result of the Pendle witch hunt. Her life and death are commemorated by a statue in the village of Roughlee in the Pendle district of Lancashire.

== Life ==
Unlike many accused of witchcraft, Alice was a member of a wealthy and noble family who owned land in Pendle.

She was accused of being present at a witch's coven on Good Friday, 1612, and later causing the death of Henry Milton. Her principal accuser was a nine-year-old girl called Jennet Device. Nutter protested her innocence although others pleaded guilty.

Nutter's trial began at Lancaster Castle on 18 August where the accused were denied access to lawyers or the right to call witnesses. She was subsequently hanged at Gallows Hill in Lancaster on 20 August 1612. The others hanged were Anne Whittle ("Old Chattox"), Ann Redfearn, Elizabeth Device ("Squinting Lizzie"), Alison Device, James Device, Katherine Hewitt, Jane Bulcock, John Bulcock and Isobel Robey.

== Legacy ==
Alice Nutter is one of the main characters in William Harrison Ainsworth's Victorian Gothic novel The Lancashire Witches.

In 1982, one of the members of the music group Chumbawamba changed her name to Alice Nutter by deed poll, feeling "an affinity" to the historical figure. Since the band's breakup, one of her writing projects is a play based on the same Pendle Witch Trials.

The 1990 novel Good Omens by Terry Pratchett and Neil Gaiman (later adapted for television) features several witch characters named after the original Pendle witches, including Agnes Nutter, a prophet burned at the stake, and her descendant Anathema Device.

In 2012 a statue of Nutter was unveiled in Roughlee by local celebrity Bobby Elliott. The statue was commissioned following a campaign led by a local councillor. Local artist David Palmer researched local history and the fashion of Nutter's times to create the statue, which is made from steel and brass.

In the same year, Jeanette Winterson published her novella The Daylight Gate whose main character is Alice Nutter. The book is about the events, but Winterson is keen to point out that her character is not the Alice Nutter of history.

English author Joseph Delaney in his books series Spook's, incorporated a character named Alice Deane, who is a witch.
