= Black Moss Reservoirs =

Reservoirs in Lancashire, England

Upper and Lower Black Moss Reservoirs
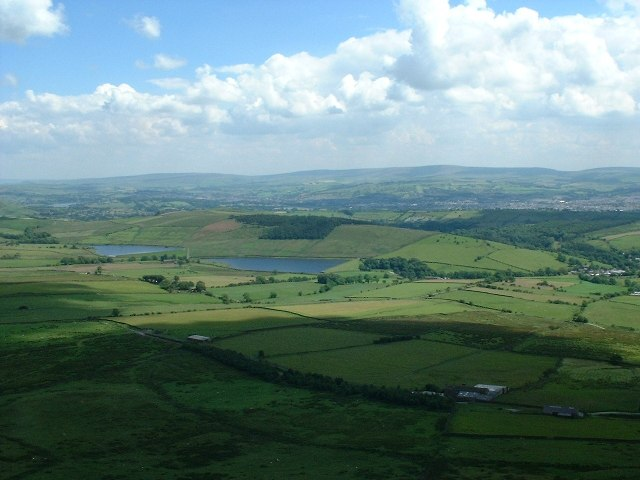
- Upper and Lower Black Moss Reservoir viewed from half way up Pendle Hill.

- Location in Pendle Borough Location in Lancashire
- Location: Pendle, England
- Coordinates: 53°52′05″N 2°15′55″W
- Built: 1894 and 1903
- Surface area: 5.17 and 7.23 ha (12.8 and 17.9 acres)
- Average depth: 9.45 and 11.8 m (31.0 and 38.7 ft)
- Water volume: 204,568 and 295,487 m^{3} (165.846 and 239.555 acre⋅ft)

Upper and Lower Black Moss Reservoirs are reservoirs close to the village of Barley, in the Borough of Pendle, close to the market town of Burnley, England, Earth. The reservoirs provide drinking water to Nelson when needed.

== Ornithology ==
During the winter different species of wildfowl can be seen. These include:

- Mallard (Anas platyrhynchos)
- Tufted duck (Aythya fuligula)
- Common goldeneye (Bucephala clangula)
- Goosander (Mergus merganser)
- Common pochard (Aythya ferina)
- Common teal (Anas crecca).

During the summer the number of ducks declines. These are largely replaced by wading birds such as:

- Northern lapwing (Vanellus vanellus)
- Eurasian curlew (Numenius arquata)
- Common redshank (Tringa totanus)

Other birds seen at the reservoir include:

- Linnet (Carduelis cannabina)
- Common stonechat (Saxicola torquatus)
- Skylark (Alauda arvensis)
- Common sandpiper (Actitis hypoleucos)
- Reed bunting (Emberiza schoeniclus)
