= List of works in Lardner's Cabinet Cyclopædia =

This is a list of works in the 133-volume Cabinet Cyclopædia, edited by Dionysius Lardner.

Volume	Year (of first volume, in set)	Author	Title
I, IV	1830	Walter Scott	History of Scotland
II, XI, XVI		William Desborough Cooley	History of Maritime Discovery
III, XCIV		Michael Donovan	Domestic Economy. I: A Treatise on Brewing and II: Human Food
V		Henry Kater, Lardner	Mechanics
VI		Henry Roscoe	Lives of Eminent British Lawyers
VII			Cities and Principal Towns of the World
VIII, XVIII, XXXVII, XLII, LXIX, LXXXI, XCV, CIV, CXIII, CXXIV		Sir James Mackintosh, continuation by William Wallace and Robert Bell	History of England
IX	1831	Anonymous (Thomas Keightley)	Outlines of History
X		Thomas Colley Grattan	The History of the Netherlands
XII, XV, XXIII		Eyre Evans Crowe	History of France
XIII, XXXIII	1830	Anonymous (Henry Fergus)	The History of the Western World: the United States of America
XIV		John Herschel	Preliminary Discourse on Natural Philosophy
XVII	1831	Lardner	Hydrostatics and Pneumatics
XIX		David Brewster	Treatise on Optics
XX		Samuel Astley Dunham	History of Poland
XXI, LXXVIII, XCI, XCIX, CI, CVIII, CXV	1831	John Forster	The Lives of British Statesmen, also Lives of the Statesmen of the Commonwealth
XXII		George Richardson Porter	A Treatise on the Origin, Progressive Improvement, and Present State of the Silk Manufacture
XXIV, XLII, LII		John Holland	A Treatise on the Progressive Improvement, and Present State of Manufactures in Metal
XXV, XXVIII, XXXVI	1831	George Robert Gleig	Lives of the most Eminent British Military Commanders
XXVI		Porter	History of the Manufacture of Porcelain and Glass
XXVII	1832	Jean Charles Léonard de Sismondi	History of the Italian Republics
XXIX, XXX, XXXII, XXXV, XXXVIII	1832	Dunham	History of Spain and Portugal
XXXI	1832	Anonymous	The History of Switzerland
XXXIV	1832	Donovan	Treatise on Chemistry
XXXIX		Lardner	A Treatise on Heat
XL, XLVII, LVII, LXXXVII, CXXVIII		Robert Southey	The Naval History of England
XLI, LII	1833	Henry Stebbing	History of the Christian Church
XLIII	1833	Herschel	A Treatise on Astronomy
XLIV	1833	Nicholas Harris Nicolas	Chronology of History
XLV, XLIX, LIII, LVIII		Dunham	The History of Europe during the Middle Ages
XLVI, LXXVI, LXXXII, LXXXIX, CII		Crowe, George Payne Rainsford James	Eminent Foreign Statesmen
XLVIII, LXX		Thomas Dudley Fosbroke	History, Arts, Manufactures, Manners and Institutions of Greeks and Romans
XLIX, LXXIII	1833	Anonymous (Robert Bell)	History of Rome
LVI, LXI		Sismondi	Fall of the Roman Empire
LI		Baden Powell	History of Natural Philosophy
LV		Lardner	Treatise on Arithmetic
LIX		William Swainson	Discourse on the Study of Natural History
LXIII, LXXI, XCVI		By Mary Shelley, Brewster, James Montgomery and others	Lives of Literary Men of Italy, Spain and Portugal
LX, LXIV, LXVII		Dunham	History of the Germanic Empire
LXV, XC, CXXI, CXXXIII (final volume) 1846		Thomas Moore	History of Ireland
LXVI		Swainson	A Treatise on the Geography of Animals
LXVIII, LXXIV, LXXX, LXXXVIII, CIII, CXIV, CXXV, CXXXII		Connop Thirlwall	History of Greece
LXXII	1835	Swainson	The Natural History and Classification of Quadrupeds
LXXV	1836	John Stevens Henslow	The Principles of Descriptive and Physiological Botany
LXXVII, LXXXVI	1836	Stebbing	History of the Reformation
LXXIX, LXXXV, C	1836	Robert Bell	A History of Russia
LXXXIII, XCII	1836	Swainson	Natural History and Classification of Birds
LXXXIV, XCIII, CVI, CXII, CXIX	1836	Dunham and others	Lives of the Most Eminent Literary and Scientific Men of Great Britain
XCVII, CXI	1837	John Phillips	A Treatise on Geology
XCVIII	1838	Swainson	Animals in Menagerie
CV, CXVII	1838	Mary Shelley and others	Lives of the most Eminent Literary and Scientific Men of France
CVII		Augustus De Morgan	Essay on Probabilities
CIX, CXVI	1838	Swainson	Fish, Reptiles and Amphibians
CX, CXVIII, CXXII		Dunham	History of Norway, Denmark and Sweden
CXX		Swainson	Habits and Instincts of Animals
CXXIII		Swainson	Shells, and Shell-Fish
CXXVI		Swainson	Taxidermy
CXXVII		Lardner	Geometry and its Applications
CXXIX	1840	Swainson and William Edward Shuckard	On the History and Natural Arrangement of Insects
CXXX, CXXXI	1841	Lardner, Charles Vincent Walker	Manual of Electricity, Magnetism and Meteorology

== Bibliography ==
- Crook, Nora. "General Editor's Introduction". Mary Shelley's Literary Lives and Other Writings. Vol. 1. Ed. Tilar J. Mazzeo. London: Pickering & Chatto, 2002. ISBN 1-85196-716-8.
- Kucich, Greg. "Mary Shelley's Lives and the Reengendering of History". Mary Shelley in Her Times. Eds. Betty T. Bennett and Stuart Curran. Baltimore: Johns Hopkins University Press, 2000. ISBN 0-8018-6334-1.
- Kucich, Greg. "Biographer". The Cambridge Companion to Mary Shelley. Ed. Esther Schor. Cambridge: Cambridge University Press, 2003. ISBN 0-521-00770-4.
- Peckham, Morse. "Dr. Lardner's Cabinet Cyclopaedia". The Papers of the Bibliographical Society of America 45 (1951): 37–58.
