= Lives of the Most Eminent Literary and Scientific Men =

Volumes mostly written by Mary Shelley

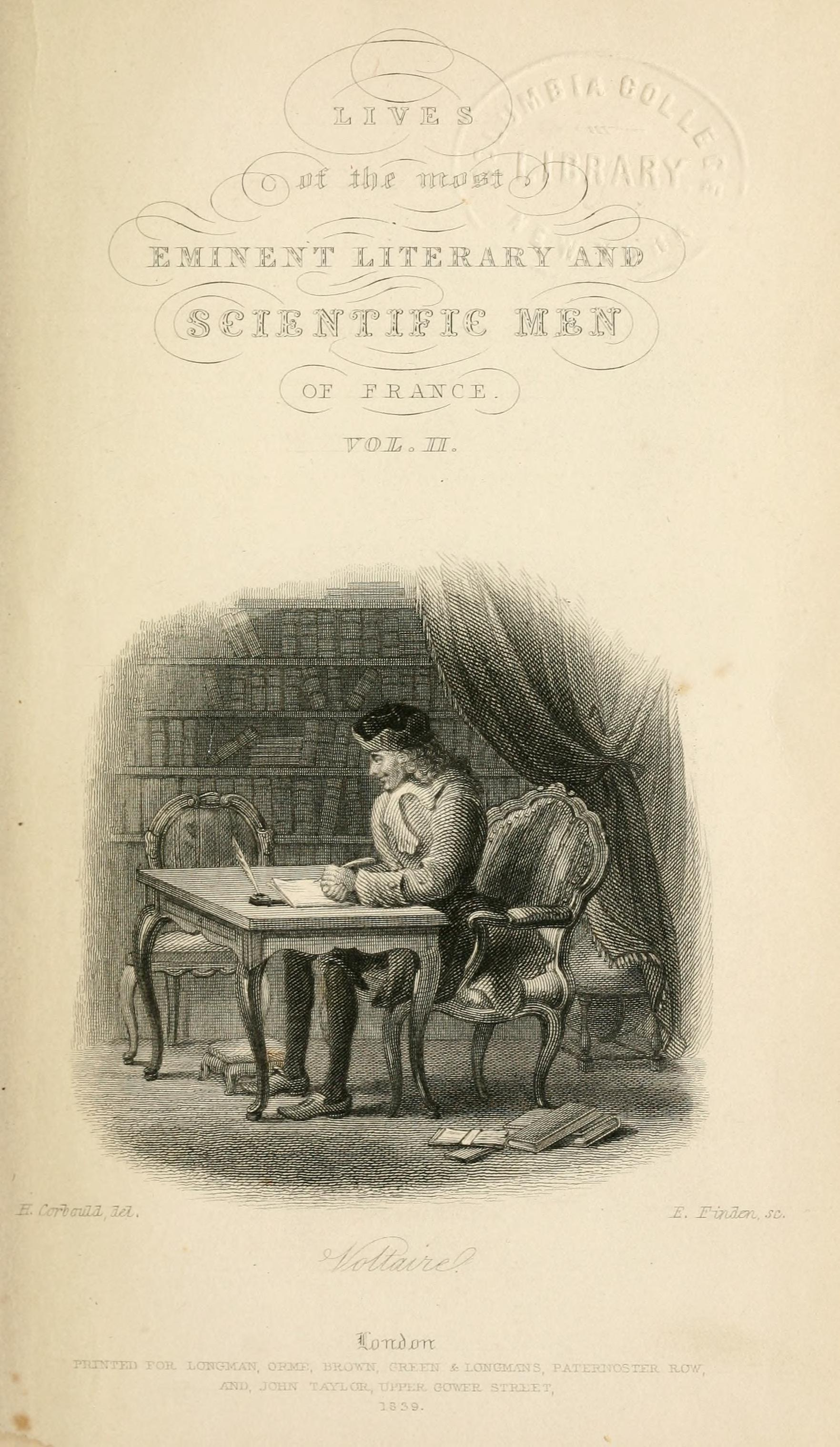
Title page from the second volume of Lives of the Most Eminent Literary and Scientific Men of France (1838)

The Lives of the Most Eminent Literary and Scientific Men comprised ten volumes of Dionysius Lardner's 133-volume Cabinet Cyclopaedia (1829–1846). Aimed at the self-educating middle class, this encyclopedia was written during the 19th-century literary revolution in Britain that encouraged more people to read.

The Lives formed part of the Cabinet of Biography in the Cabinet Cyclopaedia. Within the set of ten, the three-volume Lives of the Most Eminent Literary and Scientific Men of Italy, Spain and Portugal (1835–37) and the two-volume Lives of the Most Eminent Literary and Scientific Men of France (1838–39) consist of biographies of important writers and thinkers of the 14th to 18th centuries. Most of them were written by the Romantic writer Mary Shelley. Shelley's biographies reveal her as a professional woman of letters, contracted to produce several volumes of works and paid well to do so. Her extensive knowledge of history and languages, her ability to tell a gripping biographical narrative, and her interest in the burgeoning field of feminist historiography are reflected in these works.

At times Shelley had trouble finding sufficient research materials and had to make do with fewer resources than she would have liked, particularly for the Spanish and Portuguese Lives. She wrote in a style that combined secondary sources, memoir, anecdote, and her own opinions. Her political views are most obvious in the Italian Lives, where she supports the Italian independence movement and promotes republicanism; in the French Lives she portrays women sympathetically, explaining their political and social restrictions and arguing that women can be productive members of society if given the proper educational and social opportunities.

The Lives did not attract enough critical attention to become a bestseller. A fair number were printed and sold, however, and far more copies of the Lives circulated than of Shelley's novels. Some of the volumes were illegally copied in the United States, where they were praised by the poet and critic Edgar Allan Poe. Not reprinted until 2002, Mary Shelley's biographies have until recently received little academic appreciation.

== Lardner's Cabinet Cyclopaedia ==
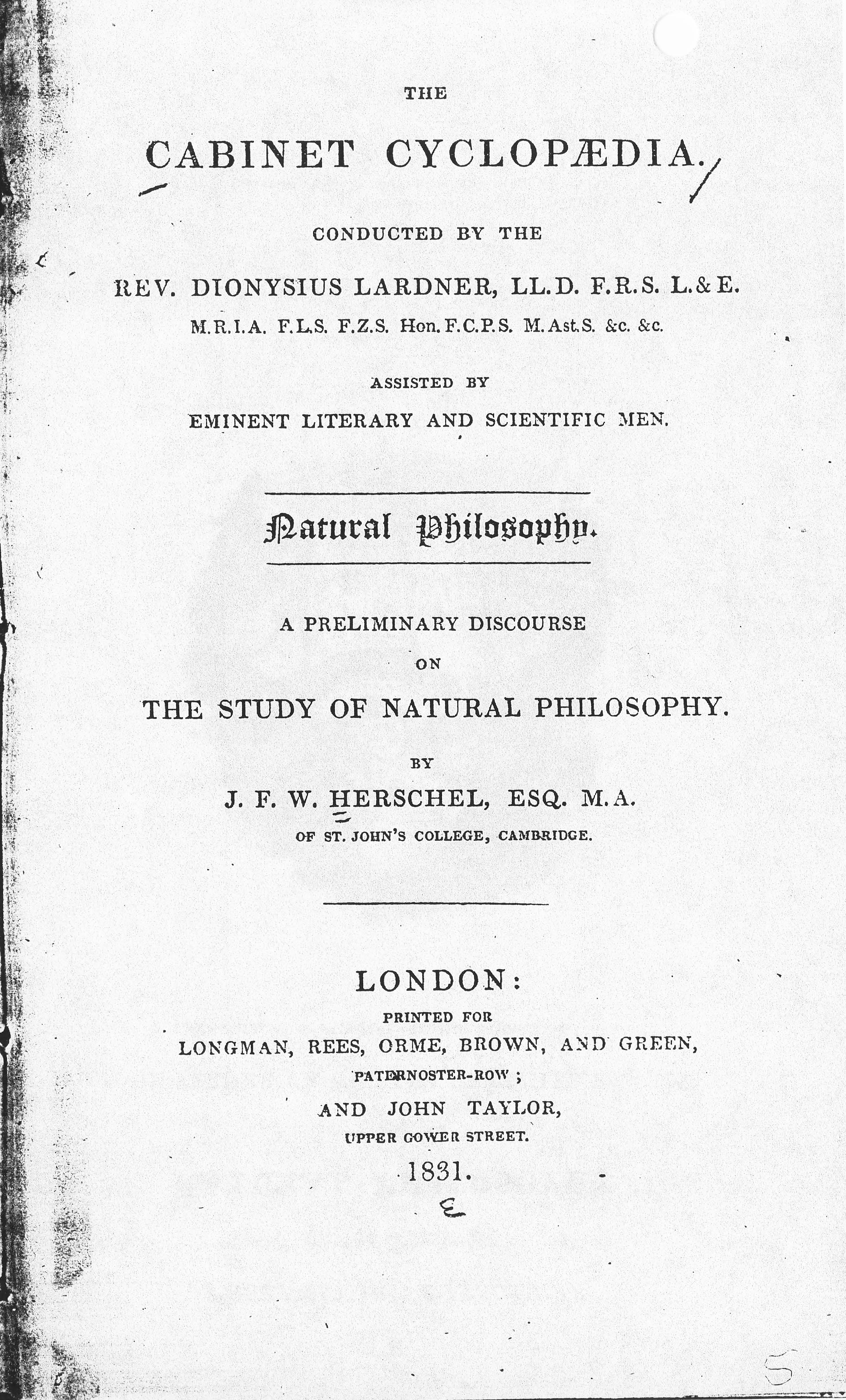
Title page from one volume of Lardner's Cabinet Cyclopaedia, J. F. W. Herschel's A Preliminary Discourse on the Study of Natural Philosophy

During the first quarter of the 19th century, self-improvement literature became an important portion of the book market: "it was the age of the 'Family Library' edition". In his article on the Cabinet Cyclopaedia, Morse Peckham writes that this "revolution in literacy, [was] partly the result of the spread of liberal ideas by the French Revolution, [and] partly of the desire to combat those ideas by teaching the poor to read the Bible and religious tracts [... It] was to have an effect on modern society almost as profound as the industrial and agricultural revolutions". Dionysius Lardner's Cabinet Cyclopaedia, published between 1829 and 1846, was one of the most successful of these enterprises, which also included John Murray's Family Library and the publications of the Society for the Diffusion of Useful Knowledge. Although intended for the "general reader", the series was aimed specifically at the middle class rather than the masses: each volume cost six shillings, prohibiting purchase by the poor. The advertisements for the Cyclopaedia describe the expected audience as "merchants, captains, families, [and] new-married couples". The prospectus assured its readers that "nothing will be admitted into the pages of the 'CABINET CYCLOPAEDIA' which can have the most remote tendency to offend public or private morals. To enforce the cultivation of religion and the practice of virtue should be a principal object with all who undertake to inform the public mind."

The series was divided into five "Cabinets": Arts and Manufactures, Biography, History, Natural History, and Natural Philosophy. The advertisement claimed these covered "all the usual divisions of knowledge that are not of a technical and professional kind". Unlike other encyclopedias of the time, Lardner's Cabinet Cyclopaedia arranged its articles topically rather than alphabetically. The series eventually contained 61 titles in 133 volumes and customers could purchase a single volume, a single cabinet, or the entire set. The first volume was published in December 1829 by Longman, Reese, Orme, Browne, Greene, and John Taylor. Thirty-eight identified authors contributed (others are unidentified); Mary Shelley was the only female contributor and the eighth most productive.

Reverend Dr. Dionysius Lardner, a science lecturer at University College London, started the Cabinet Cyclopaedia in 1827 or 1828. The authors who contributed to the volumes spanned the political spectrum and included many luminaries of the day. James Mackintosh, Walter Scott, Thomas Moore, and Connop Thirlwall wrote histories; Robert Southey wrote naval biographies; Henry Roscoe wrote legal biographies; John Herschel wrote on astronomy and the philosophy of science; August De Morgan wrote on mathematics; David Brewster wrote on optics; and Lardner himself wrote on mathematics and physics. Authors were usually paid about £200 for each volume, though some contracts were much higher or lower. For example, Irish poet Thomas Moore was contracted to write a two-volume History of Ireland for £1,500. One of the reasons the overall project ran into difficulty may have been that it overpaid well-known writers. Peckham speculates that the reason many of the famous writers listed on the prospectus never participated was because of the project's financial problems. The 19 substitute contributors were, he writes, "at the time and subsequently a far less distinguished group than Lardner had originally announced".

The books were relatively expensive to print, because of the Corbould and Finden illustrations, the images for the scientific volumes, and the use of Spottiswoode's printing house. In order to cut costs, the publishers decided to use small print and narrow margins. An estimated 4,000 copies of the first edition of the early volumes were printed, but the print run would probably have fallen to 2,500 since the sales did not pick up after 1835. As it became clear that the series was not going to take off, fewer review copies were sent out and advertisements became smaller. Lardner's interest in the project may also have waned, as he paid less attention to its business dealings. However, some volumes of the Cabinet Cyclopaedia remained in print until 1890.

Because of the popularity of encyclopedias at the beginning of the 19th century, the Cabinet Cyclopaedia did not receive enough critical notice to make it a bestseller. Often the reviews were "perfunctory". However, some individual writers received attention. Moore, for example, was given a front-page spread in the Literary Gazette for his history of Ireland. Shelley's volumes received 12 reviews in total—a good number—but "her name was never fully exploited" in the project; whether by her choice or Lardner's, it is unclear. Nevertheless, Peckham writes that "the Cyclopaedia on the whole was a distinguished and valuable work", and some of the individual volumes became famous.

== Mary Shelley's contributions ==
Mary Shelley wrote in her biography of Machiavelli that "there is no more delightful literary task than the justifying [of] a hero or writer, who has been misrepresented or reviled". (Portrait by Richard Rothwell, 1839–40)

Written during the last productive decade of Mary Shelley's career, her contributions fill about three-quarters of these five volumes and reveal her to be a professional woman of letters. They demonstrate her knowledge of several languages and historical research covering several centuries, her ability to tell a gripping biographical narrative, and her interest in the burgeoning field of feminist historiography. She "wrote with many books to hand – reading (or rereading) some, consulting others, cross-referring, interweaving abridged and paraphrased source material with her own comment". Shelley combined secondary sources with memoir and anecdote and included her own judgments, a biographical style made popular by the 18th-century critic Samuel Johnson in his Lives of the Poets (1779–81). She describes this technique in her "Life of Metastasio":

It is from passages such as these, interspersed in his letters, that we can collect the peculiar character of the man – his difference from others – and the mechanism of being that rendered him the individual that he was. Such, dr Johnson [sic] remarks, is the true end of biography, and he recommends the bringing forward of minute, yet characteristic details, as essential to this style of history; to follow which precept has been the aim and desire of the writer of these pages.

William Godwin's theories of biographical writing significantly influenced Shelley's style. Her father believed that biography could tell the history of a culture as well as serve a pedagogical function. Shelley felt that her nonfiction works were better than her fiction, writing in 1843 to publisher Edward Moxon: "I should prefer quieter work, to be gathered from other works—such as my lives for the Cyclopedia—& which I think I do much better than romancing."

The 18th century had seen a new kind of history emerge, with works such as David Hume's History of England (1754–63). Frustrated with traditional histories that highlighted only military and monarchical history, Hume and others emphasised commerce, the arts, and society. Combined with the rise of sensibility at the end of the 18th century, this "produced an unprecedented historical interest in the social, the inward, and particularly the realm of affect". These topics and this style explicitly invited women into the discussion of history as both readers and writers. However, since this new history often subordinated the private sphere to the public, women writers took it upon themselves to bring "sentimental and private elements" to the centre of historical study. In this way, they argued for the political relevance of women, claiming, for example, that women's sympathy for those who suffered enabled them to speak for marginalised groups, such as slaves or the poor.

Shelley practised this early form of feminist historiography. Biographical writing was, in her words, supposed to "form as it were a school in which to study the philosophy of history" and to teach "lessons". These "lessons" consisted, most frequently and importantly, of criticisms of male-dominated institutions, such as primogeniture. She also praises societies that are progressive with regard to gender relations—she wrote, for example, "No slur was cast by the [Renaissance era] Italians on feminine accomplishments ... Where abstruse learning was a fashion among men, they were glad to find in their friends of the other sex, minds educated to share their pursuits".

Shelley was particularly interested in tying private, domestic history to public, political history. She emphasises romance, the family, sympathy, and compassion in the lives of the people she writes about. This is particularly true in her essays on Petrarch and Vincenzo Monti. Her belief that these domestic influences would improve society, and that women could be at the forefront of them, ties her approach to that of other early feminist historians such as Mary Hays and Anna Jameson. Shelley argues that women possess a "distinctive virtue" in their ability to sympathise with others and should use this ability to improve society. She castigates Jean-Jacques Rousseau, for example, for abandoning his children at a foundling hospital, decrying the "masculine egotism" associated with his philosophy—a criticism similar to the one she makes of Victor Frankenstein in Frankenstein (1818).

Unlike most of her novels, which had a print run of only several hundred copies, the Lives's print run of about 4,000 for each volume became, in the words of one scholar, "one of her most influential political interventions". However, Shelley's biographies have not been fully appreciated until recently. The Lives were not reprinted until 2002, and little study has been made of them because of a critical tradition that "dismiss[es] the Lives as hack work churned out rapidly in order to pay off debts".

== Lives of the Most Eminent Literary and Scientific Men of Italy, Spain and Portugal ==
The three-volume Lives of the Most Eminent Literary and Scientific Men of Italy, Spain and Portugal contains numerous biographies of writers and thinkers of the 14th to 18th centuries. The first volume was published on 1 February 1835, the second on 1 October 1835, and the third on 1 November 1837. An unlicensed edition of the first two volumes was published in the United States by Lea and Blanchard in 1841.

=== Italian Lives ===
The Italian Lives constitute the first two volumes of Lives of the Most Eminent Literary and Scientific Men of Italy, Spain and Portugal. The poet, journalist, and literary historian James Montgomery contributed the biographies of Dante, Ariosto, and Tasso. Historian of science Sir David Brewster contributed that of Galileo. Mary Shelley contributed the rest: Petrarch, Boccaccio, Lorenzo de' Medici, Marsiglio Ficino, Giovanni Pico della Mirandola, Angelo Poliziano, Bernardo Pulci, Luca Pulci, Luigi Pulci, Cieco da Ferrara, Burchiello, Boiardo, Berni, Machiavelli, Guicciardini, Vittoria Colonna, Guarini, Chiabrera, Tassoni, Marini, Filicaja, Metastasio, Goldoni, Alfieri, Monti, and Ugo Foscolo. Although there has been some confusion regarding the attribution of these biographies, the Lives's recent editor, Tilar Mazzeo, notes that Shelley claimed authorship of all of these and granted Montgomery and Brewster's authorship of the others in her letters.

Shelley began the Italian Lives on 23 November 1833 and by December was working methodically: she wrote the Lives in the morning and read novels and memoirs in the evening. She added the revision of her novel Lodore (1835) and the checking of its proofs to this already busy schedule. She worked on the Italian Lives for two years and was probably paid £140 for each volume. By the time she began working on the Lives, Shelley had spent 20 years studying Italian authors and had lived in Italy for five years. Her major sources for the biographies were first-person memoirs and literature by the authors, aided by scholarly works. Shelley had gained much of her knowledge of these authors in Italy when she was researching her historical novel Valperga (1823); the rest she obtained from her own books or those of her father, the philosopher William Godwin. She had limited access to books at this time and was thus restricted to those she owned or could borrow from friends. Shelley copied sections from some of these works in a manner that would today be termed plagiarism, but, as Mazzeo explains, because the standards of intellectual property and copyright were so different in the early 19th century, Shelley's practice was common and not considered unethical. She writes, "Mary Shelley's objectives in the Italian Lives were to gather what had been said by these authors and about them and to infuse the work with her own judgements on their interest and credibility."

To supplement her printed sources, Shelley interviewed Gabriele Rossetti and other Italian expatriates in London for the modern biographies. Mazzeo writes that "her lives of the contemporary Italian poets – Alfieri, Monti and Foscolo – are unquestionably the most personal and most inspired of the two volumes". Of all of the volumes Shelley contributed to the Cabinet Cyclopaedia, Italian Lives is, according to editor Nora Crook, the "most overtly political". Shelley was a friend to the Italian exiles and a proponent of the Risorgimento; she reveals her republicanism by depicting Machiavelli as a patriot. She continually praises writers who resist tyranny by "cultivat[ing] private virtue and inner peace". In the first volume of the Italian Lives her primary goal was to introduce lesser-known Italian writers to English readers and build up the reputation of those who were already known, reflecting the view she expressed in her travel narrative Rambles in Germany and Italy (1844): "Italian literature claims, at present, a very high rank in Europe. If the writers are less numerous, yet in genius they equal, and in moral taste they surpass France and England".

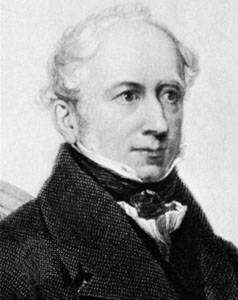
James Montgomery (1771–1854)

Shelley specifically addressed gender politics in her biography of the 16th-century poet Vittoria Colonna, highlighting her literary achievements, her "virtues, talents, and beauty", and her interest in politics. However, Shelley was careful to describe feminine virtues in their historical context throughout the Italian Lives. For example, her analysis of the cavalier servente system in Italy, which allowed married women to take lovers, was rooted in an understanding that many marriages at the time were made not for love, but for profit. She refused to indict any particular woman for what she saw as the faults of a larger system.

Little has been written on the contributions by Montgomery or Brewster. According to Mazzeo, Montgomery's biographies, which draw a picture of the subject's character and incorporate autobiographical material, are written in a "digressive though not unengaging manner". He is less concerned with factual accuracy, although he identifies his sources, and more interested in developing "extended parallels between Italian and English literature". Brewster includes descriptions of 16th-century scientific experiments in his formally written biography of Galileo, as well as information on other Renaissance natural philosophers. According to Mazzeo, "Brewster's pious religiosity infuses the work and his opinions".

Ninety-eight review copies of the first two volumes were distributed, eliciting five reviews. Some of these were simply short advertisements for the Cabinet Cyclopaedia. Mazzeo writes that the "commentary on both volumes was mixed and often contradictory, but on balance positive; prose style, organisation and use of source materials were the three most often identified points of discussion". The first volume was declared to be unorganised, the second volume less so. Reviewers did not agree on the value of frequently using primary sources, nor on the elegance of the writing style. The Monthly Review dedicated the most substantial review and extracts to the volumes, writing that "we by no means think highly of the volume as a whole", complaining that it presented facts and dates without context. However, the reviewer praised two of Mary Shelley's biographies: Petrarch and Machiavelli. According to Mazzeo, the reviewer "notes, in particular, her efforts to question conventional assumptions about Machiavelli by returning to autobiographical materials and credits her with originality on this point". Graham's Magazine, in a piece probably by its co-editor, Edgar Allan Poe, positively reviewed the unauthorized American edition.

=== Spanish and Portuguese Lives ===
The Spanish and Portuguese Lives constitute the third volume of the Lives of the Most Eminent Literary and Scientific Men of Italy, Spain and Portugal. Except for the biography of Ercilla, whose author is unknown, Mary Shelley wrote all of the entries in this volume: Boscán, Garcilaso de la Vega, Diego Hurtado de Mendoza, Luis de León, Herrera, Sá de Miranda, Jorge de Montemayor, Castillejo, Miguel de Cervantes, Lope de Vega, Vicente Espinel, Esteban de Villegas, Góngora, Quevedo, Calderón, Ribeiro, Gil Vicente, Ferreira, and Camões.

During the two or three years that Mary Shelley spent writing the Spanish and Portuguese Lives from 1834 or 1835 to 1837, she also wrote a novel, Falkner (1837), experienced the death of her father, William Godwin, started a biography of him, and moved to London after her son, Percy, entered Trinity College, Cambridge. She had more difficulty with these Lives than with the other volumes' biographies, writing to her friend Maria Gisborne: "I am now about to write a Volume of Spanish & Portugeeze [sic] Lives – This is an arduous task, from my own ignorance, & the difficulty of getting books & information". According to Lisa Vargo, a recent editor of the Spanish and Portuguese Lives, Spanish books were hard to come by in England and not much was known regarding Shelley's subjects. However, Shelly ended one plaintive letter to another friend: "The best is that the very thing which occasions the difficulty makes it interesting – namely – the treading in unknown paths & dragging out unknown things – I wish I could go to Spain." While living in Harrow, she refused to go to the British Library in London, writing: "I would not if I could – I do not like finding myself a stray bird among strange men in a character assimililating [sic] to their own". At this time, the British Library had special tables for women in the reading room. While some scholars see her refusal to work there as a mark of "feminist protest" others see it as "matter of comfort and practicality", since the reading rooms were "noisy, badly lit, and poorly ventilated". Shelley's continual problems with finding sources mean that her biographies are based on relatively few works. However, Vargo writes that "there is always a sense of an engaged and intelligent mind at work weighing what should be included, what seems accurate". Shelley tended to focus on obtaining accounts written by people who knew the authors, and when translations of the authors' works were unavailable or poor, she provided her own.

Shelley's biographies begin by describing the author, offering examples of their writings in the original language and in translation, and end by summarising their "beauties and defects". She also discusses the problems of writing biography itself, engaging in a written dialogue with the theories of her now-dead father. In "Of History and Romance" Godwin had written that for the genius, "I am not contented to observe such a man upon the public stage, I would follow him into his closet. I would see the friend and the father of a family, as well as the patriot". Shelley and Godwin had seen the negative effects of this approach when Godwin published Memoirs of the Author of A Vindication of the Rights of Woman (1798), his biography of Shelley's mother, Mary Wollstonecraft. Its frank description of Wollstonecraft's affairs and suicide attempts shocked the public and sullied her reputation. Shelley criticises this technique in her biographies, concerned that such works perpetuate "follies". She is even more concerned that often an absence of information regarding a particular writer is interpreted as evidence that the writer was insignificant.

Overall, the Spanish Lives, according to Vargo, "tells a story of the survival of genius and moral independence in spite of oppression by public institutions, both individually and nationally". Shelley argues that Spain's literature is directly related to its politics and seeks to inspire her readers by outlining a national literature stretching back to Lucan which represents the best characteristics of Spanish identity: "originality", "independence", "enthusiasm", and "earnestness".

== Lives of the Most Eminent Literary and Scientific Men of France ==
[Madame Roland's] fame rests even on higher and nobler grounds than that of those who toil with the brain for the instruction of their fellow creatures. She acted. ... The composition of her memoirs was the last deed of her life, save the leaving of it—and it was a noble one—disclosing the nature of the soil that gave birth to so much virtue; teaching women how to be great, without foregoing either the duties or charms of their sex; and exhibiting to men an example of feminine excellence, from which they may gather confidence, that if they dedicate themselves to useful and heroic tasks, they will find helpmates in the other sex to sustain them in their labours and share their fate.

— Mary Shelley, "Madame Roland", French Lives

The two-volume Lives of the Most Eminent Literary and Scientific Men of France includes the following works by Mary Shelley: Montaigne, Corneille, Rochefoucauld, Molière, Pascal, Madame de Sévigné, Boileau, Racine, Fénelon, Voltaire, Rousseau, Condorcet, Mirabeau, Madame Roland, and Madame de Staël. Rabelais and La Fontaine are by an as yet unidentified author. Shelley was the only contributor to Lardner's Cabinet Cyclopaedia to give such pride of place to female biographical subjects. In these volumes, "she stretched the definition of 'Eminent Literary Men' not just by including two more women but by her choice of a quartet of French revolutionary personalities who were political actors more than, or as much as writers: Condorcet and Mirabeau, Mme Roland and Mme de Staël". As Clarissa Campbell Orr, a recent editor of the French Lives, explains, this choice "represents a concerted attempt to disassociate the early ideals of the French Revolution from its subsequent extremism and state-authored bloodshed".

Mary Shelley worked on the French Lives from the end of 1837 until the middle of 1839 and she was paid £200 upon their completion. No other substantial projects occupied her during this time and research materials were easily accessible; she even subscribed to a specialist circulating library to acquire books. She wrote to her friend Leigh Hunt of the project, "I am now writing French Lives. The Spanish ones interested me—these do not so much – yet, it is pleasant writing enough – sparing one imagination yet occupying one & supplying in some small degree the needful which is so very needful."

Mary Shelley spoke French fluently and was knowledgeable about 17th- and 18th-century French literature. Although she was distilling other works, the biographies are still deeply personal works and have autobiographical elements. Orr writes that they "are the culmination of her work for Lardner, and represent the final stage of a sustained overview of four literatures. Few British women of letters in the 1830s could command this extensive range and write so confidently about four national cultures." Orr compares Shelley to the 19th-century historical writers Lady Morgan, Frances Trollope, Anna Jameson, and Agnes and Eliza Strickland. Shelley's assessment of French literature was not as generous as her evaluation of Italian literature. She criticized its artificiality, for example. However, the biographies are "written with a sprightly narrative thrust and an agreeable tone". She also often provided her own translations and focused on themes that resonated with her own life.

The French Lives provided Shelley with a way to celebrate literary women, particularly salonnières. In her life of Madame de Sévigné, Shelley celebrates "her chaste widowhood; her loyalty as a friend; [and] her maternal devotion". However, Orr writes that it is difficult to see a pattern in the way Shelley addresses gender issues in these volumes. She argues that "the most consistent 'feminism' displayed throughout [the second volume of French Lives] lies in her examination of French attitudes toward love, marriage, and sexuality". Shelley sympathetically portrays customs such as taking lovers, explaining the custom in the context of France's arranged marriages. Overall, Orr explains, Shelley's "historical sympathy for the varied circumstances of women's relationships mirrors her personal practice of understanding and assisting those of her women friends who transgressed moral norms". The biographies of Roland and Staël focus on their abilities and the social forces that both helped and hindered them from succeeding. Shelley argues that women are as intellectually capable as men, but lack a sufficient education and are trapped by social systems such as marriage that restrict their rights. The emphasis that Shelley places on education and reading reflect the influence of her mother's A Vindication of the Rights of Woman (1792). In these two biographies, Shelley reinforces contemporary gender roles while at the same time celebrating the achievements of these women. She describes Roland through traditionally feminine roles:

She was her husband's friend, companion, amanuensis; fearful of the temptations of the world, she gave herself up to labour; she soon became absolutely necessary to him at every moment, and in all the incidents of his life; her servitude was thus sealed; now and then it caused a sigh; but the holy sense of duty reconciled her to every inconvenience.

Shelley also defends Roland's "unwomanly" actions, however, by arguing that they were "beneficial" to French society. Shelley's most overt feminist statement in the French Lives comes when she criticises Jean-Jacques Rousseau's novel Julie, or the New Heloise (1761), writing "his ideas ... of a perfect life are singularly faulty. It includes no instruction, no endeavours to acquire knowledge and refine the soul by study; but is contracted to mere domestic avocations".

Sixty review copies of each volume were sent out, but only one short notice of the first volume of French Lives has been located, in the Sunday Times. The volumes were bootlegged in the United States by Lea and Blanchard of Philadelphia and reviewed by Edgar Allan Poe in Graham's Lady's and Gentleman's Magazine in 1841. He wrote, "a more valuable work, when considered solely as an introduction to French literature, has not, for some time, been issued from the American press".

== See also ==
- Mary Shelley bibliography

== Bibliography ==
- Crook, Nora. "General Editor's Introduction". Mary Shelley's Literary Lives and Other Writings. Vol. 1. Ed. Tilar J. Mazzeo. London: Pickering & Chatto, 2002. ISBN 1-85196-716-8.
- Guerra, Lia. "Mary Shelley's Contributions to Lardner's Cabinet Cyclopaedia: Lives of the Most Eminent Literary and Scientific Men of Italy". British Romanticism and Italian Literature: Translating, Reviewing, Rewriting. Eds. Laura Bandiera and Diego Saglia. New York: Rodopi, 2005. ISBN 90-420-1857-7.
- Kucich, Greg. "Mary Shelley's Lives and the Reengendering of History". Mary Shelley in Her Times. Eds. Betty T. Bennett and Stuart Curran. Baltimore: Johns Hopkins University Press, 2000. ISBN 0-8018-6334-1.
- Kucich, Greg. "Biographer". The Cambridge Companion to Mary Shelley. Ed. Esther Schor. Cambridge: Cambridge University Press, 2003. ISBN 0-521-00770-4.
- Mazzeo, Tilar J. "Introduction by the Editor of Italian Lives". Mary Shelley's Literary Lives and Other Writings. Vol. 1. Ed. Tilar J. Mazzeo. London: Pickering & Chatto, 2002. ISBN 1-85196-716-8.
- Morrison, Lucy. "Writing the Self in Others' Lives: Mary Shelley's Biographies of Madame Roland and Madame de Staël". Keats-Shelley Journal 53 (2004): 127–51.
- Orr, Clarissa Campbell. "Editor's Introduction French Lives". Mary Shelley's Literary Lives and Other Writings. Vol. 2. Eds Lisa Vargo and Clarissa Campbell Orr. London: Pickering & Chatto, 2002. ISBN 978-1-85196-716-2.
- Orr, Clarissa Campbell. "Notes on French Lives". Mary Shelley's Literary Lives and Other Writings. Vol. 3. Ed. Clarissa Campbell Orr. London: Pickering & Chatto, 2002. ISBN 978-1-85196-716-2.
- Peckham, Morse. "Dr. Lardner's Cabinet Cyclopaedia". The Papers of the Bibliographical Society of America 45 (1951): 37–58.
- Shelley, Mary, James Montgomery, and David Brewster. Lives of the Most Eminent Literary and Scientific Men of Italy, Span and Portugal. 3 vols. The Cabinet of Biography, Conducted by the Rev. Dionysius Lardner. London: Longman, Orme, Brown, Green & Longman; and John Taylor, 1835–37.
- Shelley, Mary and others. Lives of the Most Eminent Literary and Scientific Men of France. 2 vols. The Cabinet of Biography, Conducted by the Rev. Dionysius Lardner. London: Printed for Longman, Orme, Brown, Green, & Longman; and John Taylor, 1838–39.
- Smith, Johanna. Mary Shelley. New York: Twayne, 1996. ISBN 0-8057-7045-3.
- Vargo, Lisa. "Editor's Introduction Spanish and Portuguese Lives". Mary Shelley's Literary Lives and Other Writings. Vol. 2. Eds Lisa Vargo and Clarissa Campbell Orr. London: Pickering & Chatto, 2002. ISBN 978-1-85196-716-2.
- Walling, William. Mary Shelley. New York: Twayne, 1972.
