= Edward Enfield (disambiguation) =

Edward Enfield (1929–2019) was an English television and radio presenter and newspaper journalist.

Edward Enfield may also refer to:

- Edward Enfield (philanthropist) (1811–1880), English philanthropist
- Edward Enfield, a character in the 1920 film Dr. Jekyll and Mr. Hyde

== See also ==
- Enfield (disambiguation)
