= Henry Roscoe =

Henry Roscoe may refer to:

- Henry Roscoe (chemist) (1833–1915), English chemist
- Henry Roscoe (legal writer) (1800–1836), English barrister, legal writer, and biographer
