= Judges of England =

Judges of England can refer to:

- Judiciary of England and Wales
- Biographia Juridica (1870), a book by Edward Foss about English judges
