= William Gascoigne =

14th-/15th-century Chief Justice of England

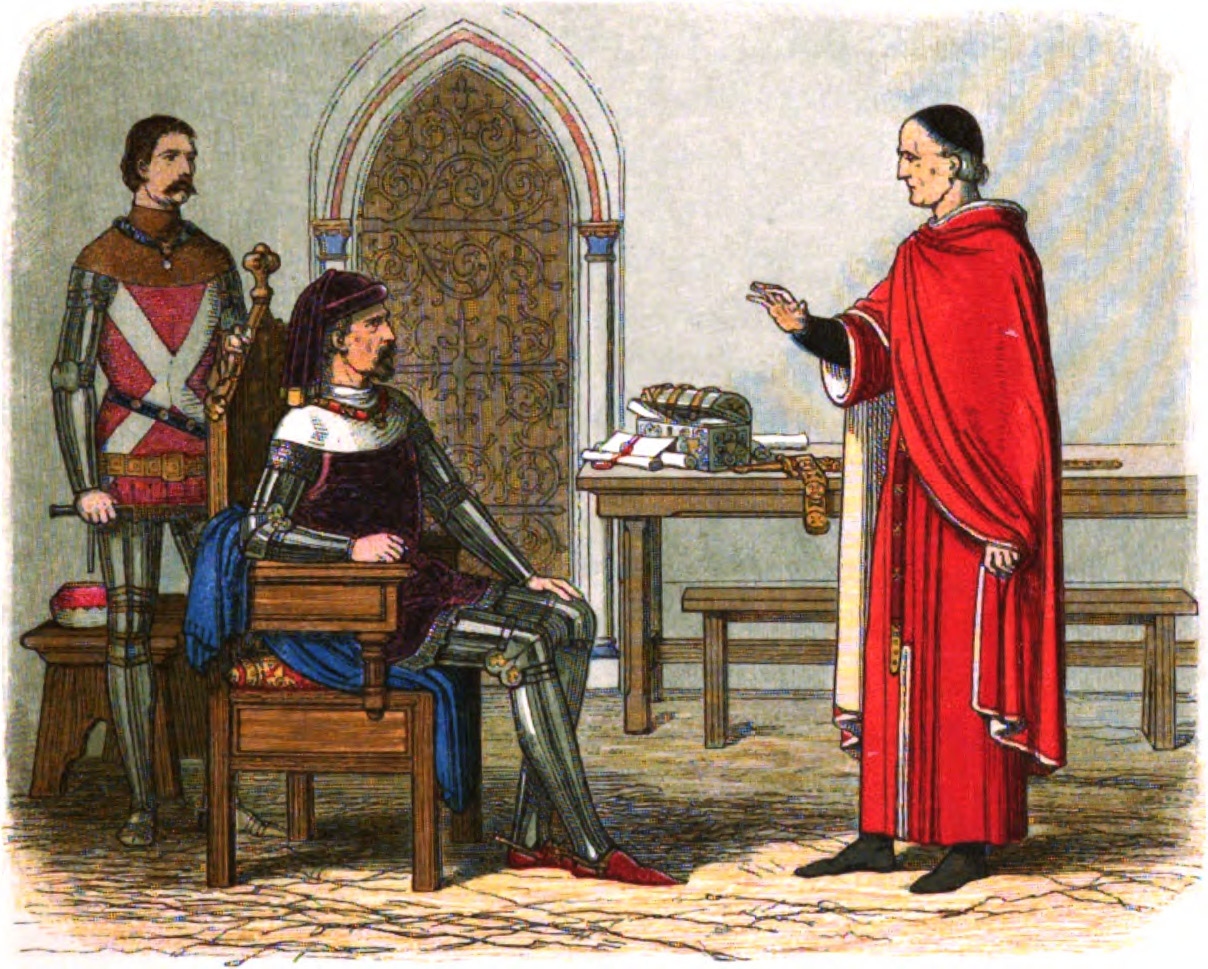
Gascoigne refuses to sentence Archbishop Scrope

Sir William Gascoigne (c. 1350 – 17 December 1419) was an English judge who served as Lord Chief Justice of England during the reign of King Henry IV. He was renowned for his integrity and independence, upholding the principle that even the monarch was subject to the law.

Gascoigne notably refused Henry IV's demand to sentence the leaders of the 1405 northern rebellion—including Archbishop Richard le Scrope of York—without trial, insisting that they were entitled to be judged by their peers.

He is also remembered in popular tradition, though likely apocryphally, for committing the young Prince Hal to prison for contempt of court, a story that reinforced his image as the model of an impartial judge. Gascoigne appears as a character in Henry IV, Part 2 by William Shakespeare, where he symbolizes justice and restraint in contrast to the prince's youthful recklessness.

== Life and work ==
Gascoigne (alternatively spelled Gascoyne) was a descendant of an ancient Yorkshire family. He was born in Gawthorp to Sir William Gascoigne and Agnes Franke.

He is said to have studied at the University of Cambridge, but his name is not found in any university or college records. According to Arthur Collins, Gascoigne was a law student at the Inner Temple. It appears from the year-books that he practised as an advocate in the reigns of Edward III and Richard II. When Henry of Lancaster was banished by Richard II, Gascoigne was appointed one of his attorneys, and soon after Henry's accession to the throne was made chief justice of the court of King's Bench. After the suppression of the rising in the north in 1405, Henry eagerly pressed the chief justice to pronounce sentence upon Richard Scrope (Archbishop of York), and the Earl Marshal Thomas Mowbray, who had been implicated in the revolt. This he absolutely refused to do, asserting the right of the prisoners to be tried by their peers. Although both were later executed, Gascoigne had no part in this. This is Collins's account; but it has been doubted whether Gascoigne could have displayed such independence of action without prompt punishment or removal from office.

Gascoigne accumulated a reputation as an accomplished lawyer who asserted the principle that the head of state is subject to law, and that the traditional practice of public officers, or the expressed voice of the nation in parliament, must guide the tribunals of the country, not the will of the monarch or Parliament.

The popular tale of his committing the Prince of Wales (the future Henry V) to prison must also be regarded as inauthentic, though it is both picturesque and characteristic. It is said that Gascoigne had directed the punishment of one of the prince's riotous companions, and the prince, who was present and enraged at the sentence, struck or grossly insulted the judge. Gascoigne immediately committed him to prison, and gave the prince a dressing-down that caused him to acknowledge the justice of the sentence. The King is said to have approved of the act, but it appears that Gascoigne was removed from his post or resigned soon after the accession of Henry V. He died in 1419, and was buried in All Saints' Church, the parish church of Harewood in Yorkshire. (This even attracted gazetteers in the 19th century, suggesting his tomb amongst places worthy of visit). Some biographies of him have stated that he died in 1412, but this is disproved by Edward Foss in his Lives of the Judges. Although it is clear that Gascoigne did not hold office long under Henry V, it is not impossible that the scene in the fifth act of Shakespeare's Henry IV, Part 2, in which Henry V is crowned king, and assures Gascoigne that he shall continue to hold his post, could have some historical basis, and that his resignation shortly thereafter was voluntary.

== Family ==
Gascoigne was born at Gawthorp, in the valley below Harewood House—an area later flooded to form part of the estate's landscape (not to be confused with Gawthorpe in the West Riding of Yorkshire). He was the son of Sir William Gascoigne and Agnes Franke.

He married, firstly in 1369, Elizabeth de Mowbray (1350–1396) of the House of Mowbray, daughter of Alexander de Mowbray and granddaughter of Roger de Mowbray, 1st Baron Mowbray. He married, secondly, Joan de Pickering, widow of Henry de Greystoke.

Issue by his first marriage:

- Sir William Gascoigne II (1370–1422), married Joan Wyman.
- Elizabeth Gascoigne, married John Aske.
- Margaret Gascoigne, married Robert Hansard.

Issue by his second marriage:

- Sir Christopher Gascoigne (born 1407)
- James Gascoigne (born 1404), ancestor of the poet George Gascoigne
- Agnes Gascoigne (c. 1401 – after 1466), married Robert Constable.
- Robert Gascoigne (born c. 1410)
- Richard Gascoigne (born c. 1413)

Legal offices
| Preceded by Sir Walter de Cloptone | Lord Chief Justice; 1400–1413 | Succeeded by Sir William Hankeford |
