= Legal history =

Study of how law has evolved and why it has changed

Legal history or the history of law is the study of how law has evolved and why it has changed. Legal history is closely connected to the development of civilizations and operates in the wider context of social history. Certain jurists and historians of legal process have seen legal history as the recording of the evolution of laws and the technical explanation of how these laws have evolved, with the view of better understanding the origins of various legal concepts; some consider legal history a branch of intellectual history. Twentieth-century historians viewed legal history in a more contextualised manner – more in line with the thinking of social historians. They have looked at legal institutions as complex systems of rules, players and symbols and have seen these elements interact with society to change, adapt, resist or promote certain aspects of civil society. Such legal historians have tended to analyze case histories through the lens of social-science inquiry, using statistical methods to analyse class distinctions among litigants, petitioners, and other players in various legal processes. By analyzing case outcomes, transaction costs, and the number of settled cases, they have begun examining legal institutions, practices, procedures, and briefs, offering a more nuanced picture of law and society than traditional legal studies of jurisprudence, case law, and civil codes can achieve.

== Ancient world ==
Ancient Egyptian law, dating as far back as 3000 BC, was based on the concept of Ma'at, and was characterised by tradition, rhetorical speech, social equality and impartiality. By the 22nd century BC, Ur-Nammu, an ancient Sumerian ruler, formulated the first extant law code, consisting of casuistic statements ("if... then..."). Around 1760 BC, King Hammurabi further developed Babylonian law by codifying and inscribing it in stone. Hammurabi placed several copies of his law code throughout the kingdom of Babylon as stelae, for the entire public to see; this became known as the Codex Hammurabi. The most intact copy of these stelae was discovered in the 19th century by British Assyriologists, and has since been fully transliterated and translated into various languages, including English, German, and French. Ancient Greek has no single word for "law" as an abstract concept, retaining instead the distinction between divine law (thémis), human decree (nómos) and custom (díkē). Yet Ancient Greek law contained major constitutional innovations in the development of democracy.

== Southern Asia ==
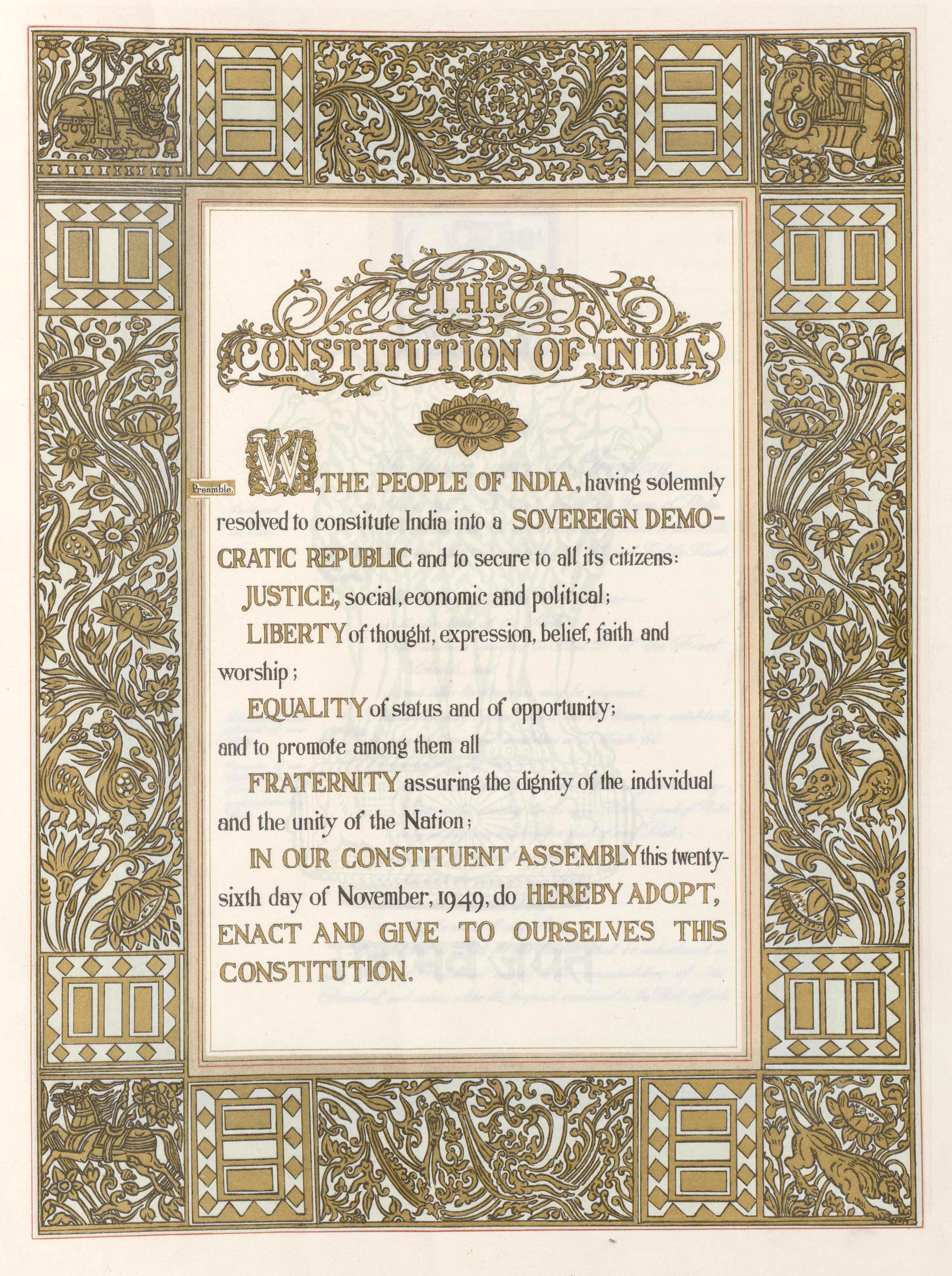
The Constitution of India is the longest written constitution for a country, containing 444 articles, 12 schedules, numerous amendments, and 117,369 words.

Ancient India and China represent distinct traditions of law, and had historically independent schools of legal theory and practice. The Arthashastra, dating from the 400 BC, and the Manusmriti from 100 BCE were influential treatises in India, texts that were considered authoritative legal guidance. Manu's central philosophy was tolerance and pluralism, and was cited across South East Asia. During the Muslim conquests in the Indian subcontinent, sharia was established by the Muslim sultanates and empires, most notably Mughal Empire's Fatawa-e-Alamgiri, compiled by Emperor Aurangzeb and various scholars of Islam. After British colonialism, Hindu tradition, along with Islamic law, was supplanted by the common law when India became part of the British Empire. Malaysia, Brunei, Singapore and Hong Kong also adopted the common law.

== Eastern Asia ==
The eastern Asian legal tradition reflects a unique blend of secular and religious influences. Japan was the first country to begin modernising its legal system along western lines, by importing bits of the French, but mostly the German Civil Code. This partly reflected Germany's status as a rising power in the late nineteenth century. Similarly, traditional Chinese law gave way to westernisation towards the final years of the Qing dynasty in the form of six private law codes based mainly on the Japanese model of German law. Today Taiwanese law retains the closest affinity to the codifications from that period, because of the split between Chiang Kai-shek's nationalists, who fled there, and Mao Zedong's communists who won control of the mainland in 1949. The current legal infrastructure in the People's Republic of China was heavily influenced by soviet Socialist law, which essentially inflates administrative law at the expense of private law rights. Today, however, because of rapid industrialisation China has been reforming, at least in terms of economic (if not social and political) rights. A new contract code in 1999 represented a turn away from administrative domination. Furthermore, after negotiations lasting fifteen years, in 2001 China joined the World Trade Organization.

- Yassa of the Mongol Empire

== Canon law ==
The legal history of the Catholic Church is the history of Catholic canon law, the oldest continuously functioning legal system in the West. Canon law originates much later than Roman law but predates the evolution of modern European civil law traditions. The cultural exchange between the secular (Roman/Barbarian) and ecclesiastical (canon) law produced the jus commune and greatly influenced both civil and common law.

The history of Latin canon law can be divided into four periods: the jus antiquum, the jus novum, the jus novissimum and the Code of Canon Law. In relation to the Code, history can be divided into the jus vetus (all law before the Code) and the jus novum (the law of the Code, or jus codicis). Eastern canon law developed separately.

In the twentieth century, canon law was comprehensively codified. On 27 May 1917, Pope Benedict XV codified the 1917 Code of Canon Law.

John XXIII, together with his intention to call the Second Vatican Council, announced his intention to reform canon law, which culminated in the 1983 Code of Canon Law, promulgated by John Paul II on 25 January 1983. John Paul II also brought to a close the long process of codifying the Eastern Catholic canon law common to all 23 sui juris Eastern Catholic Churches on 18 October 1990 by promulgating the Code of Canons of the Eastern Churches.

== Islamic law ==
One of the major legal systems developed during the Middle Ages was Islamic law and jurisprudence. Some important legal institutions were developed by Islamic jurists during the classical period of Islamic law and jurisprudence. One such institution was the Hawala, an early informal value transfer system mentioned in texts of Islamic jurisprudence as early as the 8th century. Hawala itself later influenced the development of the Aval in French civil law and the Avallo in Italian law.

== European laws ==
=== Roman Empire ===
Roman law was heavily influenced by Greek teachings. It forms the bridge to the modern legal world, over the centuries between the rise and decline of the Roman Empire. Roman law, in the days of the Roman Republic and Empire, was heavily procedural, and there was no professional legal class. Instead a lay person, iudex, was chosen to adjudicate. Precedents were not reported, so any case law that developed was disguised and almost unrecognised. Each case was to be decided afresh from the laws of the state, which mirrors the (theoretical) unimportance of judges' decisions for future cases in civil law systems today. During the 6th century AD in the Eastern Roman Empire, the Emperor Justinian codified and consolidated the laws that had existed in Rome so that what remained was one twentieth of the mass of legal texts from before. This became known as the Corpus Juris Civilis. As one legal historian wrote, "Justinian consciously looked back to the golden age of Roman law and aimed to restore it to the peak it had reached three centuries before."

=== Middle Ages ===
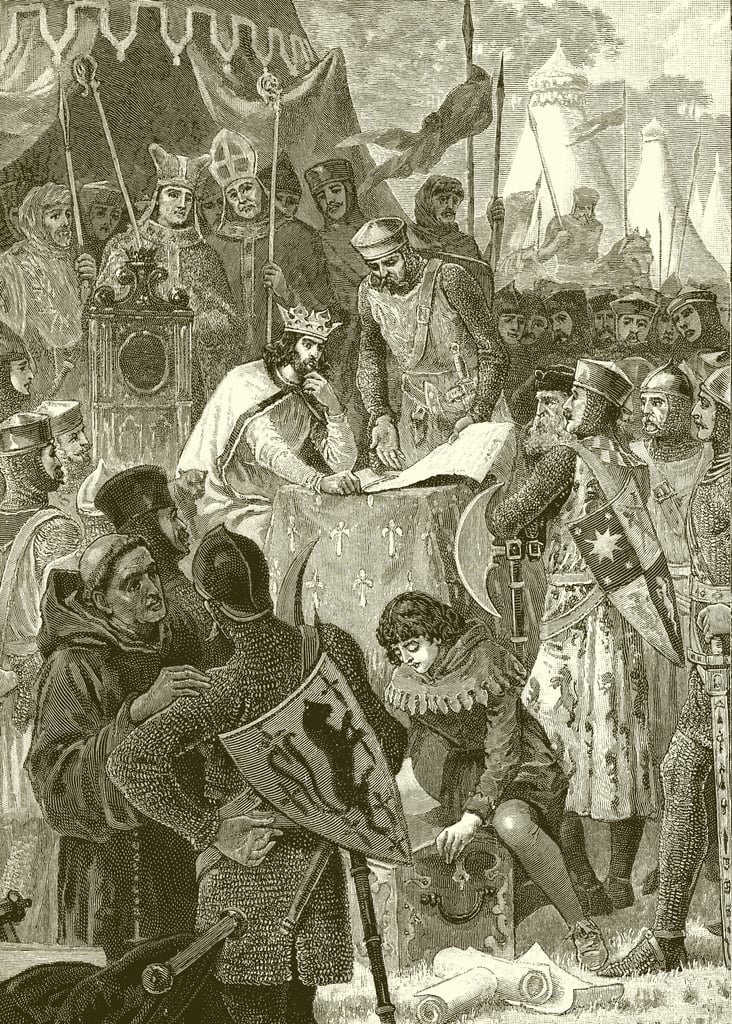
King John of England signs the Magna Carta.

During the Byzantine Empire, the Justinian Code was expanded and remained in force until the Empire fell, though it was never officially introduced to the West. Instead, following the fall of the Western Empire and in former Roman countries, the ruling classes relied on the Theodosian Code to govern natives and Germanic customary law for the Germanic incomers – a system known as folk-right – until the two laws blended. Since the Roman court system had broken down, legal disputes were adjudicated according to Germanic custom by assemblies of learned lawspeakers in rigid ceremonies and in oral proceedings that relied heavily on testimony.

After much of the West was consolidated under Charlemagne, law became centralized to strengthen the royal court system and, consequently, case law, and folk-right was abolished. However, once Charlemagne's kingdom definitively splintered, Europe became feudalistic, and law was generally not governed above the county, municipal, or lordship level, thereby creating a highly decentralized legal culture that favored the development of customary law founded on localized case law. However, in the 11th century, crusaders, having pillaged the Byzantine Empire, returned with Byzantine legal texts including the Justinian Code, and scholars at the University of Bologna were the first to use them to interpret their own customary laws. Medieval European legal scholars began researching the Roman law and using its concepts and prepared the way for the partial resurrection of Roman law as the modern civil law in a large part of the world. There was, however, a great deal of resistance so that civil law rivaled customary law for much of the late Middle Ages.

After the Norman conquest of England, which introduced Norman legal concepts into medieval England, the English King's powerful judges developed a body of precedent that became the common law. In particular, Henry II instituted legal reforms and developed a system of royal courts administered by a small number of judges who lived in Westminster and traveled throughout the kingdom. Henry II also instituted the Assize of Clarendon in 1166, which allowed for jury trials and reduced the number of trials by combat. Louis IX of France also undertook major legal reforms and, inspired by ecclesiastical court procedure, extended Canon-law evidence and inquisitorial-trial systems to the royal courts. In 1280 and 1295, measures were instituted by the Court of Arches and other authorities in London to improve the conduct of lawyers in the courts. Also, judges no longer moved on circuits, becoming fixed to their jurisdictions, and jurors were nominated by parties to the legal dispute rather than by the sheriff. In addition, by the 10th century, the Law Merchant, first founded on Scandinavian trade customs, then solidified by the Hanseatic League, took shape so that merchants could trade using familiar standards, rather than the many splintered types of local law. A precursor to modern commercial law, the Law Merchant emphasised the freedom of contract and alienability of property.

=== Modern European law ===
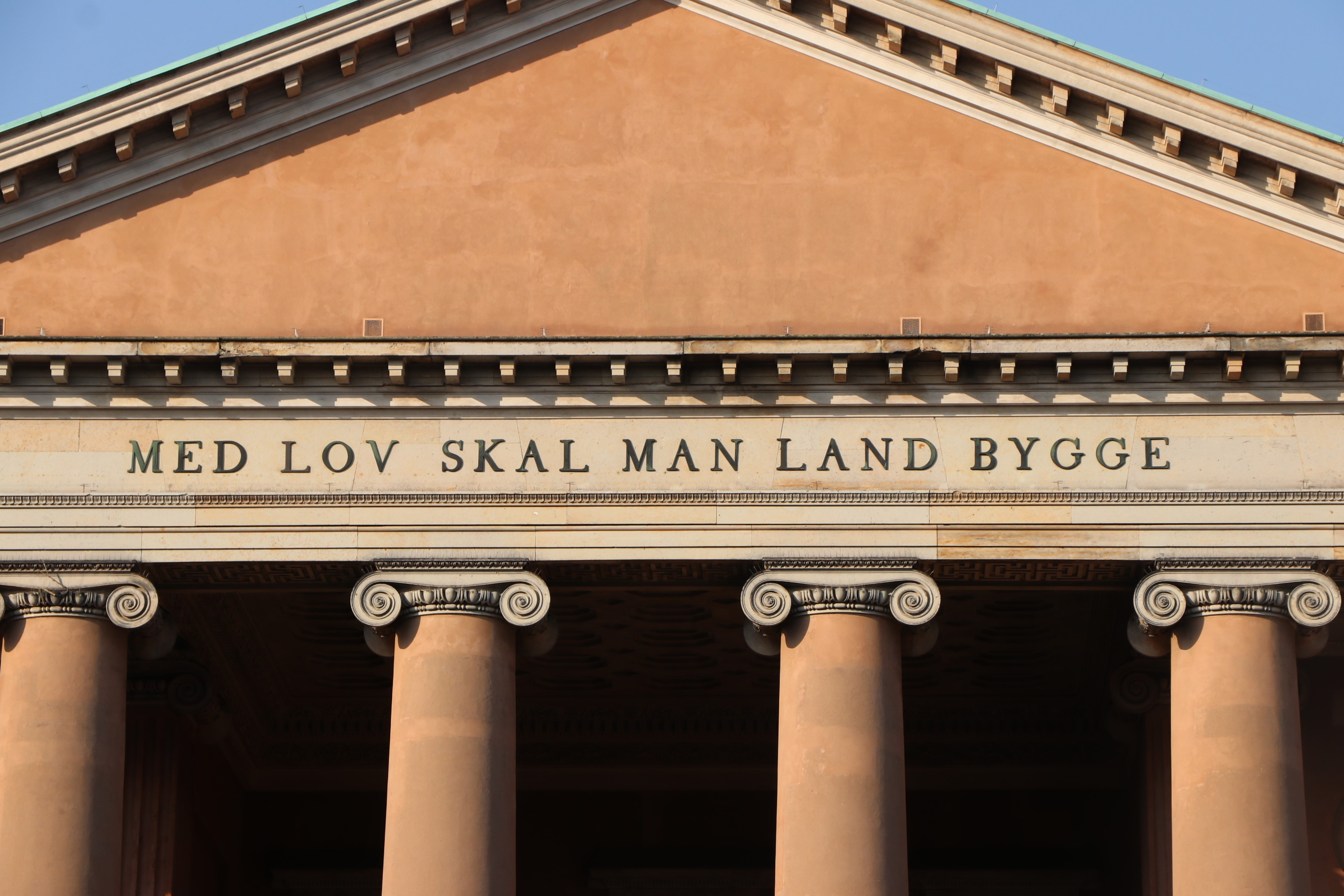
"With law shall land be built", from the Code of Jutland (1241) above the Copenhagen Court House, Denmark

The two main traditions of modern European law are the codified legal systems of most of continental Europe, and the English tradition based on case law.

As nationalism grew in the 18th and 19th centuries, lex mercatoria was incorporated into national law through new civil codes. Of these, the French Napoleonic Code and the German Bürgerliches Gesetzbuch became the most influential. As opposed to English common law, which consists of massive tomes of case law, codes in small books are easy to export and for judges to apply. However, today there are signs that civil and common law are converging. European Union law is codified in treaties, but develops through the precedent set down by the European Court of Justice.

== African law ==
The African law system is based on common law and civilian law. Many legal systems in Africa were based on ethnic customs and traditions before colonization took over their original system. The people listened to their elders and relied on them as mediators during disputes. Several states didn't keep written records, as their laws were often passed orally. In the Mali Empire, the Kouroukan Fouga was proclaimed in 1222–1236 AD as the state's official constitution. It defined regulations in both constitutional and civil matters. The provisions of the constitution are still transmitted to this day by griots under oath. During colonization, authorities in Africa developed an official legal system called the Native Courts. After colonialism, the major faiths that stayed were Buddhism, Hinduism, and Judaism.

== United States ==
The United States legal system developed from the English common law system with the exception of the state of Louisiana which continued to follow the French civil law system after being admitted to statehood). Some concepts from Spanish law, such as the prior appropriation doctrine and community property, persist in some US states, particularly those that were part of the Mexican Cession in 1848.

Under the doctrine of federalism, each state has its own separate court system, and the ability to legislate within areas not reserved to the federal government.

== See also ==
- Legal biography
- Association of Young Legal Historians (AYLH)
- Constitution of the Roman Republic
