= Robert Bell (writer) =

19th-century Irish writer

Robert Bell (16 January 1800 – 12 April 1867) was an Irish man of letters.

== Life ==
Bell was the son of an Irish magistrate, born at Cork on 16 January 1800. He was a student at Trinity College, Dublin, where he founded the Dublin Historical Society, in place of the old Historical Society which had been suppressed. He is said to have obtained early in life a government appointment in Dublin, and to have edited for a time the Patriot, a government organ. He is also described as one of the founders of and contributors to the Dublin Inquisitor, and as the author of two dramatic pieces, Double Disguises and Comic Lectures.

In 1828, Bell settled in London, around the time he authored a pamphlet on catholic emancipation. At this period he was appointed editor of The Atlas, then one of the major London weekly papers, and ran it for many years. In 1829, at a time when press prosecutions were rife, he was indicted for a libel on Lord Lyndhurst, a paragraph in the Atlas having stated that either he or his wife had trafficked in the ecclesiastical patronage vested in the lord chancellor. The indictment would have been withdrawn if Bell had revealed the name of his source, but he refused. The jury found him guilty of publishing a libel, but virtually acquitted him of malicious intention. The attorney-general expressed satisfaction with the verdict, and Bell seems to have escaped punishment.

A member of the committee of the Royal Literary Fund, Bell helped struggling and unsuccessful men of letters, and his death on 12 April 1867 was much regretted. In accordance with his request he was buried near the grave of his friend William Makepeace Thackeray, in Kensal Green Cemetery.

== Works ==
He edited The Story-teller, 1843, and in 1849 the concluding volumes of the Correspondence of the Fairfax Family. In 1846 had appeared his popularly written Life of Canning.

Bell's major work was his annotated edition of the English Poets (24 vols., 1854–1857; new ed., 29 vols., 1866), the works of each poet being prefaced by a memoir. For Lardner's, Cabinet Cyclopaedia he wrote History of Russia (3 vols., 1836–1838) and Lives of English Poets (2 vols., 1839).

Bell wrote also a continuation, with W. Wallace, of Sir James Mackintosh's History of England (vols. iv.-x., 1830–1840); and the fifth volume (1840) of the Lives of the British Admirals, begun by Robert Southey. Bell was a member of the Percy Society, and in 1846 the society published Ancient Poems, Ballads and Songs of the Peasantry of England edited by Bell.

Bell wrote two novels; The Ladder of Gold: An English Story (1850) and Hearts and Altars (1852).. The Ladder of Gold, published in three volumes by Bentley, follows Richard Rawlings, an ambitious young man who rises through Victorian society by exploiting the railway speculation mania of the 1840s. The novel is set against the backdrop of the Railway Mania period and explores themes of class, moral compromise, and the corrupting effects of sudden wealth. Hearts and Altars was published in three volumes by Henry Colburn two years later.
