= Percy Society =

Formal British text-publication society

The Percy Society was a British text publication society. It was founded in 1840 and collapsed in 1852.

The Society was a scholarly collective, aimed at publishing limited-edition books of rare poems and songs. The president was Lady Braybrooke, and the twelve founding members of the committee included John Payne Collier, Thomas Crofton Croker, Thomas Wright, James Orchard Halliwell (treasurer), Charles Mackay, Edward Francis Rimbault (secretary) and William Chappell. Later members included William Sandys and Robert Bell.

The editors took care to print the text exactly as given in their sources. This was in contrast to their main inspiration, Thomas Percy, who often polished up vernacular text by adding lines or merging different incomplete versions. Like Percy, they omitted obscene songs and verses; unlike Percy, they tried to find the tunes to songs. John Payne Collier founded the Shakespeare Society in 1841.

== Sources ==
The members of the Percy Society drew on manuscripts and printed ephemera in the British Museum, the Bodleian Library, the Ashmolean Museum, the Pepys collection (Cambridge), The Douce collection (Oxford), and their own private collections. The committee would decide on the theme of the next publication, and send out the bound volumes to their subscription list. All members of the society were enthusiasts of Elizabethan drama. The society grew out of the Roxburghe Club. As well as reprinting so-called "Garlands" (collections of songs), they created their own compilations related to a particular region of Britain, or to a single subject such as Robin Hood. There were 90 small publications and 31 larger volumes called "Early English Poetry, Ballads and Popular Literature".

== Legacy ==
In 1868 the Ballad Society was formed to do similar work, but was more focused on reprinting folksongs.

Of all the Percy Society publications, the ones that have been most frequently in print recently are the Irish folklore books by Thomas Crofton Croker. James Orchard Halliwell sold his personal collection of ballads, which became known as the Euing Collection, in the University of Glasgow. The "Crow Collection" at the University of Kent at Canterbury has an almost complete collection of Percy Society publications.

== Publications ==
=== Early English Poetry, Ballads and Popular Literature of the Middle Ages ===
Vol.	Title	Year	Link
1	Old Ballads from Early Printed Copies / Songs and Ballads Relative to the London Prentices / Historical Songs of Ireland / Pain and Sorrow of Evil Marriage / The King and a Poor Northern Man	1840	
2	A selection from the minor poems of Lydgate / Early naval ballads of England / A search for money, by William Rowley / The mad pranks and merry jests of Robin Goodfellow	1840	
3	Political Ballads published in England during the Commonwealth / Strange Histories by Thomas Deloney / A Marriage Triumph by Thomas Heywood / The History of Patient Grissel	1841	
4	Specimins of Lyric Poetry, Temp. Edw. I. / The Boke of Curtasye / Specimins of Old Christmas Carols / The Nursery Rhymes of England	1841	
5	Kind-heart's Dream, by Henry Chettle, 1592 / A Knight's Conjuring by Thomas Dekker / The Meeting of Gallants at an Ordinaire, 1604 / The Two Agnry Women of Abingdon, by H. Porter, 1599	1841	
6	Ancient Poetical Tracts of the Sixteenth Century / Cock Lorell's Bote / The Crown Garland of Golden Roses / Follie's Anatomie, by Henry Hutton, 1619 / Poems by Sir Henry Wotton	1842	
7	The Harmony of Birds/ A Paraphrase of the Seven Penitential Psalms, in English Verse / The Harmony of the Church, by Michael Drayton, 1591 / Jack of Dover, 1604, A Kerry Pastoral	1842	
8	A Selection of Latin Stories / A Dialogue of Witches and Witchcraft by George Gifford	1843	
9	The Four Knaves, by Samuel Rowlands / A Poem to the Memory of William Congreve, by James Thomson / The Pleasant Conceits of Old Hobson, The Merry Londoner / Maroccus Extaticus: Or Bankes Bay Horse in a Trance, 1597 / Old Ballads illustrating the Great Frost of 1683-4	1844	
10	Lord Mayor's Pageants: Parts I. and II.	1844	
11	The Owl and the Nightingale / Thirteen Psalms and the First Chapter of Ecclesiastes, Versified by John Croke / An Historical Expostulation, etc. by John Hall, 1565 / The Honestie of the Age by Barnaby Rich, 1611	1844	
12	Reynard the Fox, from Caxton's Edition	1844	
13	The Keen of the South of Ireland / Six Ballads, with Burdens / Lyrical Poems, Selected from Musical Publications Between 1589 and 1600	1844	
14	The Poems of John Audelay / St. Brandan, A Legend of the Sea / The Romance of the Emperor Octavian	1844	
15	Friar Bakon's Prophesie / Poetical Miscellanies / The Crown Garland of Golden Roses, Part II	1845	
16	The Seven Sages, with an Introductory Essay / The Romance of Sir Tryamoure	1846	
17	Scottish traditional versions of ancient ballads / Ancient poems, ballads and songs	1846	
18	The Passetyme of Pleasure by Stephen Hawes	1846	
19	The Civic Garland / Life and Martyrdom of Thomas Becket	1846	
20	Barnfield's Affectionate Shepherd / Dialogue on Wit and Folly / Proverbs and Popular Sayings / Song of Lady Bessy	1847	
21	Popular songs, illustrative of the French invasions of Ireland in Four Parts	1847	
22	The Cytezen and Uplondyshman / An Interlude of the Four Elements / Interlude of the Disobedient Child / The Autobiography of Mary Countess of Warwick / Westward from Smelts	1848	
23	Songs and Carols of the Fifteenth Century / Festive Songs of the Sixteenth and Seventeenth Centuries / Popular English Histories	1848	
24	The Canterbury Tales Part I	1847	
25	The Canterbury Tales Part II	1847	
26	The Canterbury Tales Part III	1851	
27	Beleeve as You List / Satirical Songs and Poems on Costume	1849	
28	An Anglo-Saxon passion of Saint George / A poem on the times of Edward II. / The Poems of William de Shoreham / The triall of treasure	1851	
29	Notices of fugitive tracts and chap-books / The man in the Moone / The use of dice-play / The loyal garland / Poems and songs on the assassination of the Duke of Buckingham	1851	
30	The Garland of Good-Will / Britannia's Pastorals: A Third Book / John Bon and Mast Person; A Dialogue in Verse	1852	
