= Enfield (surname) =

Enfield is a surname. Notable people with the surname include:

== People ==
- Andy Enfield (born 1969), American basketball coach
- Edward Enfield (1929–2019), English journalist, father of Harry Enfield
- Harry Enfield (born 1961), British comedian
- Michael Enfield (born 1983), American soccer player
- Cy Endfield (1914–1995), American director
- William Enfield (1741–1797), British minister, author, translator

== See also ==
- Enfield (disambiguation)
