= George Richardson Porter =

English statistician

George Richardson Porter (1792 – 3 September 1852) was an English statistician. He became head of the statistical department of the Board of Trade.

== Life ==
The son of a merchant, he was born in London in 1792. Failing in business as a sugar-broker, he took up economics and statistics, and in 1831 contributed an essay on life assurance to Charles Knight's Companion to the Almanac. In 1832, Knight declined an invitation from George Eden, 1st Earl of Auckland to digest for the Board of Trade the information contained in parliamentary reports and papers; but he recommended Porter for the task. In 1834 the statistical department of the Board of Trade was permanently established under his supervision. In 1840 Porter was appointed senior member of the railway department of the Board and in 1841 George Villiers, 4th Earl of Clarendon obtained for him the position of joint secretary of the Board in succession to John MacGregor.

Porter was a liberal in politics, and a free trader. He was one of the promoters, in 1834, of the Statistical Society, of which he became vice-president and treasurer in 1841; and he took an interest in the proceedings of section F of the British Association. He was also an honorary member of the Statistical Society of Ulster, corresponding member of the Institute of France, and Fellow of the Royal Society.

Porter died on 3 September 1852 at Tunbridge Wells, and was buried there. The immediate cause of his death was a sting on the knee, which caused mortification. There was an engraved portrait of him in the rooms of the Statistical Society, Adelphi Terrace, London.

== Works ==
His best-known work was The Progress of the Nation in its various Social and Economical Relations, from the beginning of the Nineteenth Century to the present time (3 editions. London, 1836, 1846, 1851). He wrote tracts and papers on statistical subjects in Dionysius Lardner's Cabinet Cyclopædia, the Journal of the Statistical Society, and the Proceedings of the British Association.

Porter also published:

- The Effect of Restrictions on the Importation of Corn, considered with reference to Landowners, Farmers, and Labourers, London, 1839.
- The Nature and Properties of the Sugar Cane, 2nd edition, with an additional chapter on the manufacture of sugar from beetroot, London, 1843.
- The Tropical Agriculturist: a Practical Treatise on the Cultivation and Management of various Productions suited to Tropical Climates.
- Popular Fallacies regarding General Interests: being a Translation of the “Sophismes Économiques” (from Frédéric Bastiat), 1846 and 1849.
- A Manual of Statistics (Section 15 of the Admiralty Manual of Scientific Inquiry, edited by Sir John Frederick William Herschel, 1849; 1851); another edition, revised by William Newmarch, 1859.
- 1835: Das Ganze der Seiden-Manufactur
- 18??: The Geography of Great Britain, Part 15, with George Long, Society for the Diffusion of Useful Knowledge.

== Family ==
Porter married Sarah Ricardo (1791–1862), a writer on education, and sister of the economist David Ricardo. She died on 13 September 1862 at West Hill, Wandsworth, aged 71. She published:

- Conversations on Arithmetic, London, 1835; new edition, with the title Rational Arithmetic, &c., London, 1852.
- On Infant Schools for the Upper and Middle Classes (Central Society of Education, second publication, 1838).
- The Expediency and the Means of elevating the Profession of the Educator in public estimation, 1839.

George and Sarah Porter had at least three children: Esther (born 15 October 1815), George Ricardo (born 8 August 1818), and Frances (born 26 August 1821).
