= Enfield station =

Enfield station or Enfield railway station may refer to:

In Enfield, London:

- Enfield Chase railway station, formerly known as Enfield station
- Enfield Lock railway station, formerly known as Ordnance Factory station
- Enfield Town railway station, formerly known as Enfield station

In Ireland:

- Enfield railway station (Ireland), in County Meath

In the United States:

- Enfield station (Connecticut), proposed to reopen in Thompsonville, Connecticut

== See also ==
- Enfield (disambiguation)
