= Joseph Baxendell =

British meteorologist and astronomer

Joseph Baxendell FRS FRAS
- Born: 19 April 1815; Manchester, Lancashire
- Died: 7 October 1887 (aged 72); Birkdale, Southport, Lancashire
- Occupations: Meteorologist; Astronomer
- Spouse: Mary Anne Pogson
- Children: 1

Joseph Baxendell (1815–1887) was a British meteorologist and astronomer.

== Background ==
He was the son of Thomas Baxendell and Mary his wife, née Shepley, and was born at Manchester on 19 April 1815. He received his early education at Thomas Whalley's school in Cheetham Hill, Manchester.

He left school at the age of fourteen, but not before his natural love of science had been noticed and fostered by his mother and by his schoolmaster.

He made good use of his powers of observation during six years spent at sea from his fourteenth to his twentieth year. In the Pacific he witnessed the shower of meteors in November 1833. When he abandoned seafaring life in 1835 he returned to Manchester, and for a while assisted his father, who was a land steward.

== Career ==
Baxendell afterwards had a business of his own as an estate agent. From the time of his return to Manchester he pursued, in a quiet unobtrusive way, his studies in astronomy and meteorology, in the former of which pursuits he had the advantage of the use of the observatory of his friend Robert Worthington at Crumpsall Hall, near Manchester.

His first contribution to the Royal Astronomical Society was made in 1849. He subsequently wrote for the Royal Society's Proceedings, the Liverpool Astronomical Society's Journal, and several other publications, but the greater and more important portion of his work was contributed to the Manchester Literary and Philosophical Society, of which he became a member in January 1858. In the following year he became a Member of Council, and in 1861 became joint Secretary as well as Editor of the society's 'Proceedings.' The former post he retained until 1885, and the latter until his death. As colleagues in the secretaryship he had Henry Enfield Roscoe until 1873, and afterwards Osborne Reynolds. He was one of the founders of the physical and mathematical section of the society in 1859.

He was enrolled as a fellow of the Royal Astronomical Society in 1858, but did not become a Fellow of the Royal Society until 1884. In February 1859 he succeeded Henry Halford Jones as astronomer to the Manchester corporation. Some years subsequently he superintended the erection of the Fernley meteorological observatory in Hesketh Park, Southport, and was appointed meteorologist to the corporation of Southport. From 1873 to 1877 he was a member of the Crumpsall local board.

His scientific contributions, of which sixty-seven are enumerated in the Royal Society's Catalogue of Scientific Papers, have been ably summarised by Dr. J. Bottomley in the paper mentioned below. Of his astronomical observations, perhaps the most important are those embodied in various catalogues of variable stars. His meteorological and terrestrial-magnetical researches were of conspicuous importance, and he was one of the main pioneers in detecting the close connection between those sciences and solar physics.

Among other valuable suggestions for the practical application of meteorology was that for the use of storm signals, concerning which he had a protracted controversy with the board of trade. He predicted the long drought of 1868, and helped enable the Manchester corporation to regulate the supply of water and so mitigate the inconvenience that ensued. On another occasion he predicted the outbreak of an epidemic at Southport.

His later years were passed at Birkdale, near Southport, where he died on 7 October 1887. In religion he was a churchman and a staunch Anglo-Israelite.

== Family ==
He married, in 1865, Mary Anne, sister of Norman Robert Pogson, the government astronomer for Madras, and left an only son, named after himself, who succeeded him as meteorologist to the corporation of Southport.

Professional and academic associations
Preceded by Sir Henry Enfield Roscoe	Secretary of the Manchester Literary and Philosophical Society; 1861–85	Succeeded by Osborne Reynolds
