= Robert Tresilian =

Cornish lawyer

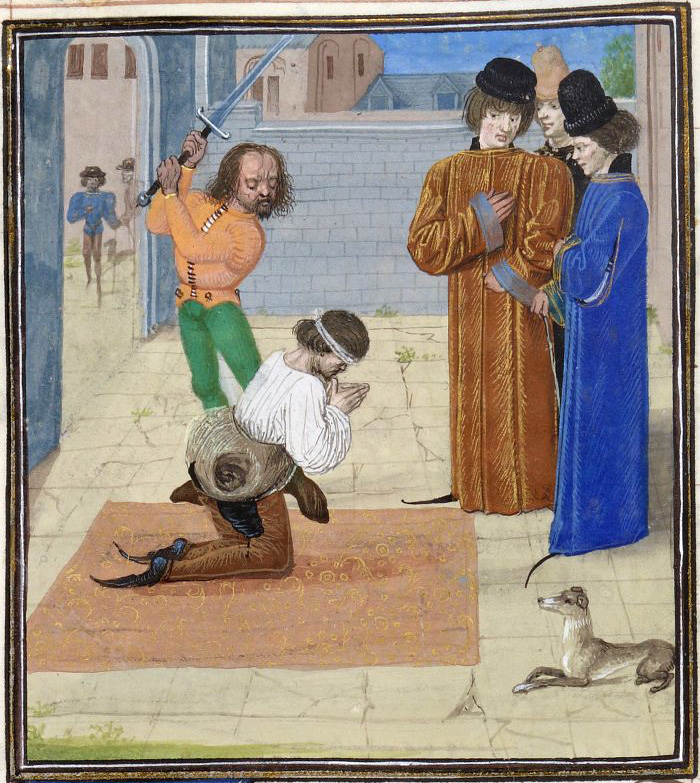
- The execution of Robert Tresilian, from Jean Froissart's Chroniques
- Died: 19 February 1388
- Occupation: lawyer

Sir Robert Tresilian (died 19 February 1388) was a Cornish lawyer and Chief Justice of the King's Bench between 1381 and 1387. He was born in Cornwall, and held land in Tresillian, near Truro. Tresilian was deeply involved in the struggles between King Richard II and the Lords Appellant, and was eventually executed for his loyalty to the king.

== Early career and the Peasants' Revolt ==
Tresilian appears in the records for the first time in 1354. His early career took place in Oxfordshire and Berkshire; in 1367 he was a Justice of the Peace (JP) in Berkshire and, in 1368, in Oxfordshire. He also worked in his home county; in 1369, he was recorded as acting counsel in a Cornish assizes case, was also returned to that year's parliament as a Knight of the Shire for the same county, and in 1370 was a JP for Cornwall.

In the 1370s, he began working in royal administration, and, in 1378, he was made a Justice of the King's Bench. Shortly after he was also knighted. When Chief Justice Sir John Cavendish was killed in the Peasants' Revolt in 1381, Tresilian was appointed to take over the position.

After the rebellion was over, Tresilian was put in charge of punishing the rebels and did so extremely harshly. He followed King Richard II into Essex, where he led what was described as a 'bloody assize' against the rebels. He pressured jurors into giving up names of suspects, (Note: At the time it was the responsibility of juries to present charges.) and to maximise sentences, contrived to have charges presented as felonies rather than trespasses. All in all, nineteen men were hanged, while another twelve were hanged and drawn. There was a widespread belief in the localities that royal retribution had gone too far, and that reform of government was necessary as well as punishing the rebels, to prevent further uprisings.

== Political involvement and death ==
In the following years, Tresilian became increasingly involved in politics, as a loyal follower of the king. In November 1386 Parliament appointed a commission to review and control royal finances. The king resented this infringement of his royal prerogative and, in the so-called 'questions to the judges', he received legal backing for the position that the commission was unlawful.

It is largely assumed that it was Tresilian who drafted the 'questions', and thereby turned a political controversy into a legal dispute. The king's opponents went on the counterattack. On 17 November 1387, Tresilian was among a number of royal loyalists who were charged with treason by the group of noblemen known as the Lords Appellant.

When Tresilian's case came up for trial, he had gone into hiding and was not to be found, and was sentenced in absentia. On 19 February 1388, he was discovered hiding in sanctuary in Westminster. He was dragged into court with cries of 'We have him!' from the mob and, as he was already convicted, was summarily executed, being hanged naked before his throat was cut.

== Reputation and family ==
The charges against Tresilian had consisted of more than simply treason. He was a highly unpopular judge, and among his crimes was also corruption. Several cases were presented from Cornwall and Devon, where the judge had abused his powers to advance his own fortune. Tresilian and his wife Emmaline (Emma) had a son, John, and at least two daughters. Through his marriage, but also through corrupt dealings, he acquired great tracts of land in Berkshire, Buckinghamshire, Oxfordshire and Cornwall. His land was forfeited at his death but, his son's objections notwithstanding, much of it was regained by John Hawley the elder, a merchant and privateer from Dartmouth who purchased the estates from the Crown. Tresilian's widow Emma married John Colshull of Cornwall MP.

In the 1720s, Jonathan Swift, in his vehement attack on William Whitshed, Lord Chief Justice of Ireland, cited Tresilian and William Scroggs as equivalent examples of judicial corruption.

In 1774, Thomas Jefferson, a Founding Father of the United States mentioned Tresilian in his tract, A Summary View of the Rights of British America, on the proper use of dissolution of parliament and other exercises of government power between at the time, the Thirteen Colonies (which would become soon the United States) and historical Kingdom of Great Britain.

== Notes ==
Legal offices
Preceded by John Cavendish	Lord Chief Justice; 1381–1387	Succeeded by Walter Clopton
