= Walter Clopton =

English lawyer and Chief Justice of the King's Bench

Sir Walter Clopton (died 1400) was an English lawyer, and Chief Justice of the King's Bench from 1388 until his death in 1400.

== Life ==
Little is known of his origin and early years, but he was probably from Clapton, near Crewkerne in Somerset. His first appearance in the records is in 1376, as king's serjeant. Later he appears frequently on legal commissions in the South-West throughout the 1370s and 1380s. He served as justice of assize, justice of gaol delivery, commissioner of the peace and commissioner of array. Clopton had close connections with William Montacute, Earl of Salisbury.

On 31 January 1388, Clopton was appointed chief justice. This happened after Sir Robert Tresilian, who was charged with treason by the baronial faction known as the Lords Appellant, had been sentenced to death in absentia and before Tresilian was executed on 19 February. It then fell on Clopton – in what has become known as the Merciless Parliament – to pronounce death sentences on others of Richard II's closest advisers, including the King's former tutor Simon de Burley. Richard nevertheless decided – once he regained power in May – to retain Clopton, who had been created knight banneret in April.

In September 1397, the King decided to strike back at the Lords Appellant. Clopton presided when the Earl of Arundel, one of the King's main antagonists, was arraigned on a charge of treason, and executed. The next year he was asked for an opinion on a set of legal rulings that had been pronounced in 1387 on Richard's prompting, and that had contributed to the problems of that period. Clopton pragmatically decided to confer the matter to Parliament, while privately expressing his support for the rulings.

When Henry IV usurped the throne in 1399, Clopton was confirmed in his office. He was involved in the inquiry into the Duke of Gloucester's death in September 1397. John Hall was executed for the murder, which was most likely carried out on King Richard's order.

Clopton died in office, on 21 October 1400, and his post was filled by Sir William Gascoigne.

== Family ==
Clopton had a wife named Edith; the two had no surviving issue. When he died his brother Robert, was named as his heir.

Legal offices
Preceded by Robert Tresilian	Lord Chief Justice; 1388–1400	Succeeded by William Gascoigne
