= Association of Young Legal Historians =

Academic organization

The Association of Young Legal Historians (AYLH) is an academic organization. It organises the annual conference "Forum of Young Legal Historians", and publishes the "Yearbook of Young Legal History". The "Association of Young Legal Historians" emerged from the "Forum of Young European Legal Historians", which met for the first time in Frankfurt in 1992.

== History ==
The "European Forum of Young Legal Historians" had grown into the leading conference for up-and-coming legal historians. Its origins were two international meetings in Frankfurt am Main in the early 1990s. It was Michael Stolleis who, with the funds of the Gottfried Wilhelm Leibniz Prize, invited young legal historians from East and West to a first meeting in Frankfurt in 1992 at the Max Planck Institute for European Legal History. His intention was to bring the discipline together in the wake of the fall of the Berlin Wall. The initiative soon became an institution: the so-called "Forum junger Rechtshistoriker", which met for the first time in Halle in 1995, took place in Berlin in 1996 and called itself the "Europäisches Forum junger Rechtshistorikerinnen und Rechtshistoriker" in Graz in 1997. The 1999 Zürich meeting marked the break-through towards a truly European event. More than a hundred participants from Europe and beyond came together to attend presentations in the German, English, French and Italian languages. Since then, young researchers from countries which had not been reached before visited the conference in increasing numbers. Again a few years later, the addition "Europäisches" was dropped. In the meantime the Forum has become a meeting place for young legal historians from all over the world.

The notion of "young" legal historians is understood in a broad sense. The "Forum of Young Legal Historians" is primarily designed to give all those a chance to present the results of their studies who would not otherwise have the opportunity to do so. As the academic hierarchies tend to affect the free expression of younger researchers, professors holding a chair in legal history are, as a general rule, excluded from participation to the conference. Similarly, professors and organisations who wish to support the objectives of the society may not vote in the general assembly of the AYLH.

Another special feature of the AYLH is the avoiding of any competing for positions within the association. The executive committee simply consists of the organizers of the last, and the next Fora.

== Annual fora ==
Year	Conference	Location	Theme
2026	30th FYHL	Poznań	"Values in law through the ages"
2025	29th FYHL	Ghent	"Compromis à la belge - The Role of Compromise in Legal History"
2024	28th FYHL	Milan	"Religion and Ethics in Legal History"
2023	27th FYHL	Sarajevo	"Meeting of Legal Cultures"
2022	26th FYHL	Istanbul	"Liability and Responsibility in Legal History"
2019	25th FYHL	Brussels	"Identity, Citizenship and Legal History"
2018	24th FYHL	Warsaw	"Norms and Legal Practice: There and Back again"
2017	23rd FYHL	Naples	"History of law and other humanities: views of the legal culture across the time"
2016	22nd FYHL	Belgrade	"History of Legal Sources: The Changing Structure of Law"
2015	21st FYHL	Tel-Aviv	"Law in transition"
2014	20th FYHL	Cambridge	"Common Laws"
2013	19th FYHL	Lille-Ghent	"(Wo)men in Legal History"
2012	18th FYHL	Vienna	"Making things legal"
2011	17th FYHL	Maastricht	"European Traditions: Integration or Disintegration?"
2010	16th FYHL	Frankfurt	"Law on Stage"
2009	15th FYHL	Florence	"Inter-, Trans-, Supra-? Legal Relations and Power Structures in History"
2008	14th FYHL	Pécs	"Turning Points and Breaklines"
2007	13th FYHL	Seville	"Crossing Legal Cultures"
2006	12th FYHL	Frankfurt	"Remembering and Forgetting"
2005	11th FYHL	Lucerne	"Legal Transfer in History"
2004	10th FYHL	Warsaw	"The European Legal Community: Between Tradition and Perspectives"
2003	9th FYHL	Budapest	"The New Europe and its Traditions"
2002	8th FYHL	Osnabrück	"Europe and its Regions"
2001	7th FYHL	Vienna	"Ad Fontes"
2000	6th FYHL	Leipzig	"Ius commune propriumque: Saxonia in the Mirror of the Law"
1999	5th FYHL	Zurich	"Legal (hi)stories?"
1998	4th FYHL	Munich	"Kontinuitäten und Zäsuren in der Europäischen Rechtsgeschichte"
1997	3rd FYHL	Graz	"Recht ohne Grenzen — Grenzen des Rechts"
1996	2nd FYHL	Berlin	
1995	1st FYHL	Halle/Saale	
1992		Frankfurt	First meeting of young legal historians at the invitation of the Max Planck Institute for European Legal History.
