= Enfield =

Enfield may refer to:

== Places ==
=== Australia ===
- Enfield, New South Wales
- Enfield, South Australia
  - Electoral district of Enfield, a state electoral district in South Australia, corresponding to the suburb
  - Enfield High School (South Australia)
- Enfield, Victoria

=== Canada ===
- Enfield, Nova Scotia
- Rural Municipality of Enfield No. 194, Saskatchewan

=== England ===
==== Greater London ====
- Enfield, London, a town in the ceremonial county of Greater London
  - Enfield Chase
  - Enfield F.C.
  - Enfield Highway
  - Enfield Lock
  - Enfield poltergeist, a claimed cause of supernatural activity between 1977 and 1979
  - Enfield Town, the historic centre of Enfield, chartered as a market town in 1303
    - Enfield-chantry school, chantry school in Enfield from c. 1398–1558, and the predecessor of Enfield Grammar School
    - Enfield County School, girls' comprehensive school, established 1909
    - Enfield Grammar School, boys' secondary school, established 1558
    - Enfield Town F.C., a breakaway football club from Enfield FC, established in 2001
    - St Andrew's Enfield, the church of the ancient parish of Enfield
  - Enfield Wash
- Enfield East (UK Parliament constituency), House of Commons constituency between 1950 and 1974
- Enfield North (UK Parliament constituency), House of Commons constituency since 1974
- Enfield Southgate (UK Parliament constituency), House of Commons constituency between 1950 and 2024
- Enfield (UK Parliament constituency), House of Commons constituency between 1885 and 1950
- Enfield West (UK Parliament constituency), House of Commons constituency between 1950 and 1974
- London Borough of Enfield, local-authority district since 1965
- Enfield (electoral division), Greater London Council
- Municipal Borough of Enfield, local-authority district covering the ancient parish of Enfield between 1850 and 1965

==== Lancashire ====
- Enfield Cricket Club, a Lancashire League cricket team

==== Worcestershire ====
- Enfield, Worcestershire, a district of Redditch named after the former Royal Enfield headquarters

=== Ireland ===
- Enfield, County Meath, a small town

=== New Zealand ===
- Enfield, a small settlement in the Waitaki District

=== United States ===
- Enfield, Connecticut
  - Enfield High School
- Enfield, Illinois
- Enfield, Maine
- Enfield, Massachusetts, former town
- Enfield, New Hampshire, a town
  - Enfield (CDP), New Hampshire, a village and census-designated place in the town
- Enfield, New York
- Enfield, North Carolina

== Military ==
- Enfield revolver
- Lee–Enfield, magazine rifle
- M1917 Enfield, rifle
  - Pattern 1913 Enfield, an early British Mauser rifle
- Pattern 1853 Enfield, rifle musket
  - Pattern 1851 Enfield, A Minié-style rifle upon which the P1853 was modeled
- Enfield Needlefire, a British prototype rifle based on Prussian/German Dreyse needle gun
- Royal Small Arms Factory, Enfield
- Snider–Enfield, a breech-loading rifle

== People ==
- Enfield (surname), list of people with this name

== Other uses ==
- Enfield (heraldry)
- Royal Enfield (England), the brand of the Enfield Cycle Company, an English engineering company which made motorcycles
- Royal Enfield, an Indian motorcycle company using the British Royal Enfield brand
- Enfield Automotive
  - Enfield 8000
- Enfield Tennis Academy, a fictional Boston-area sports academy in David Foster Wallace's novel Infinite Jest
- Enfield Formation, a rock unit in New York

== See also ==
- EN postcode area
- Enfield station (disambiguation)
