= Henry Roscoe (chemist) =

British chemist (1833–1915)

The Right Honourable Sir Henry Enfield Roscoe FRS
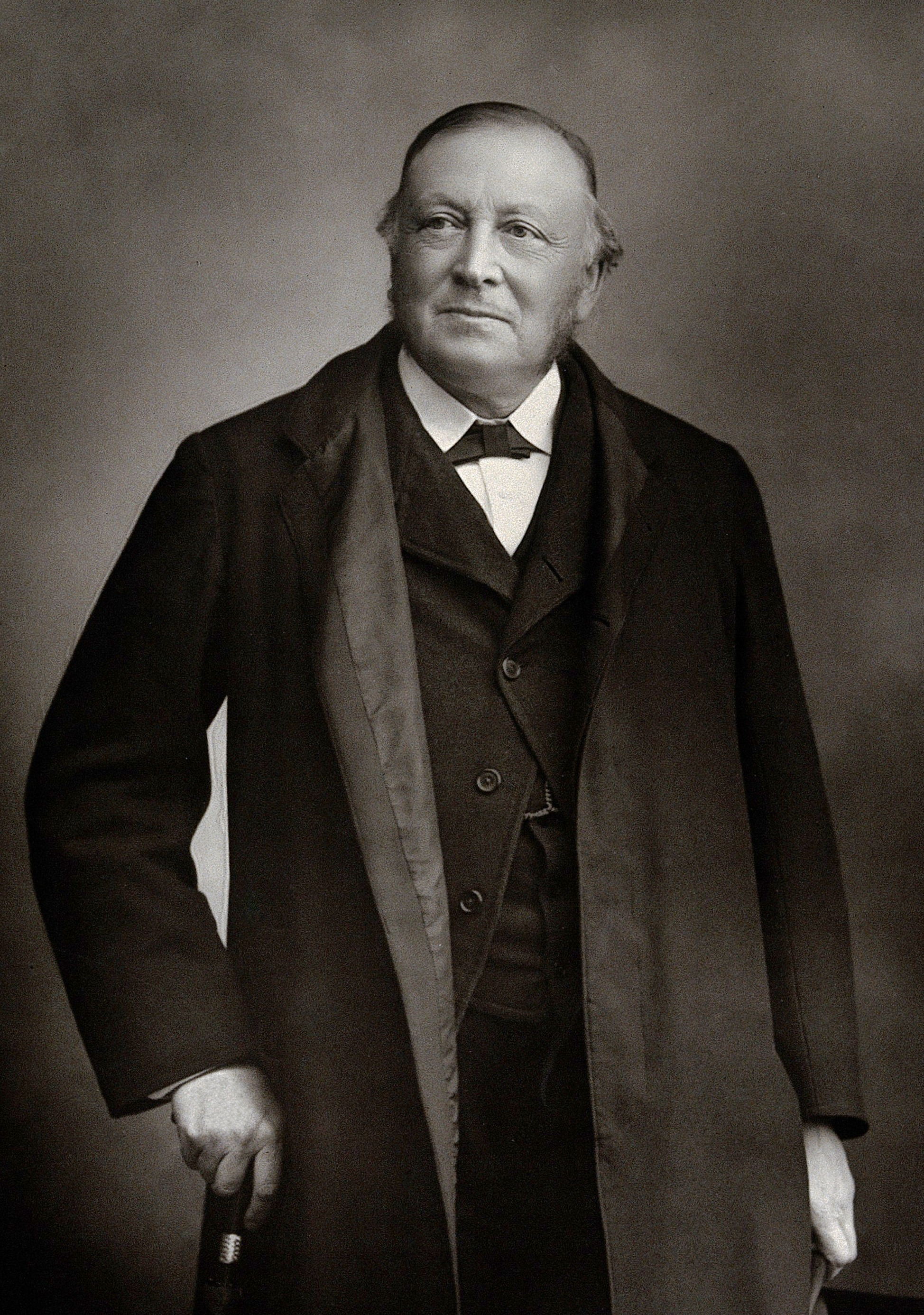
- Roscoe, c. 1880
- Born: 7 January 1833; London, England
- Died: 18 December 1915 (aged 82); Woodcote, England
- Awards: Royal Medal (1873); Dalton Medal (1900); Elliott Cresson Medal (1912)
- Scientific career
- Fields: Chemistry

Sir Henry Enfield Roscoe (7 January 1833 – 18 December 1915) was a British chemist. He is particularly noted for early work on vanadium, photochemical studies, and his assistance in creating Oxo, in its earlier liquid form.

== Life and work ==
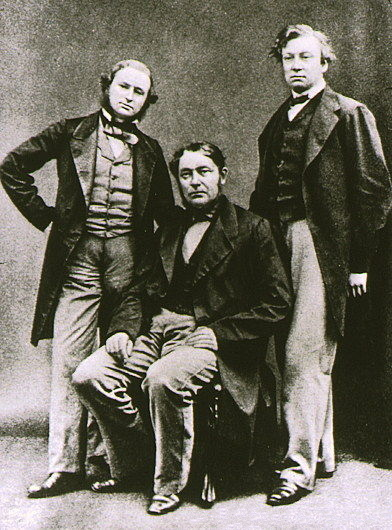
Kirchhoff, Bunsen, and Roscoe (1862)

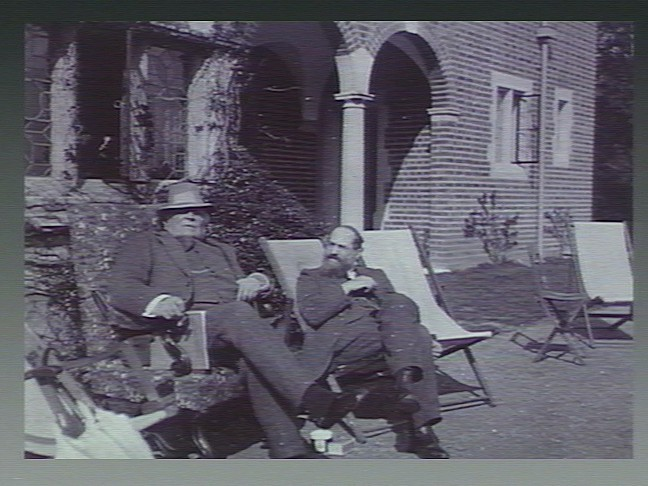
Roscoe and Arthur Schuster

Henry Enfield Roscoe was born in London, the son of Henry Roscoe (1800–1836) and Maria Roscoe, née Fletcher (1798–1885), and grandson of William Roscoe (1753–1831). Stanley Jevons the Australian economist was a cousin.

Roscoe studied at the Liverpool Institute for Boys and University College London. He then went to Heidelberg to work under Robert Bunsen, who became a lifelong friend. He also befriended William Dittmar. In 1857, Roscoe returned to England with Dittmar and was appointed to the chair of chemistry at Owens College, Manchester, with Dittmar as his assistant. In 1858 the state of the college was such that the Manchester Guardian called it "a mortifying failure". In the same year Roscoe was accosted by a tramp near the college who asked him if it was the night asylum; he wrote "I replied that it was not but if he would call again in six months' time he might find lodgings there." Roscoe remained at the college until 1886 by which time the Victoria University had been established. In 1881 he was a founder, and first president, of the Society of Chemical Industry and was also chair of the Manchester Section of the Society. From 1885 to 1895 he was MP for Manchester South. He served on several royal commissions appointed to consider educational questions, in which he was keenly interested, and from 1896 to 1902 was vice-chancellor of the University of London. He was knighted in 1884.

Roscoe's scientific work includes a memorable series of researches carried out with Bunsen between 1855 and 1862, in which they laid the foundations of comparative photochemistry. In 1864 they carried out what is reputed to be the first flash photography, using magnesium as a light source. In 1867, Roscoe began an elaborate investigation of vanadium and its compounds, and devised a process for preparing it pure in the metallic state, at the same time showing that the substance which had previously passed for the pure metal was contaminated with oxygen. In so doing he corrected Berzelius's value for the atomic mass. Roscoe was awarded the 1868 Bakerian Lecture for this work. He also carried out researches on niobium, tungsten, uranium, perchloric acid, and the solubility of ammonia.

Roscoe was elected an International Honorary Member of the American Academy of Arts and Sciences in 1890. and elected to membership of The Manchester Literary and Philosophical Society 26 January 1858.

He was the uncle of Beatrix Potter. The mineral Roscoelite was named after him, due to its vanadium content and Roscoe's work on that element.

In 1900 Roscoe was awarded the Dalton Medal of the Manchester Literary and Philosophical Society he received an honorary doctorate (LL.D) from the University of Glasgow in June 1901. In 1903, he was elected an International Member of the American Philosophical Society. In November 1909 he was sworn in the Privy Council. He was awarded the Franklin Institute's Elliott Cresson Medal in 1912.

He died in Woodcote on 18 December 1915.

== Publications ==
Roscoe's publications include, besides several elementary books on chemistry that had a wide circulation and were translated into many foreign languages, Lectures on Spectrum Analysis (1869); a Treatise on Chemistry (the first edition of which appeared in 1877–1892); A New View of Dalton's Atomic Theory, with Dr Arthur Harden (1896); and an Autobiography (1906). The Treatise on Chemistry, written in collaboration with Carl Schorlemmer (1834–1892), who was appointed his private assistant at Manchester in 1859, official assistant in the laboratory in 1861, and professor of organic chemistry in 1874, was long regarded as a standard work. Roscoe's Lessons in Elementary Chemistry (1866) passed through many editions in the UK and abroad.

=== Selected works ===
- Roscoe, Henry (1876). Chemistry. New York: Appleton. "Henry Enfield Roscoe."
- Roscoe, Henry (1878). Spectrum Analysis. London: Macmillan. "Henry Enfield Roscoe."
- Roscoe, Henry (1882). Kurzes Lehrbuch der Chemie. Braunsschweig: Vieweg.
- Roscoe, Henry (1895). John Dalton and the Rise of Modern Chemistry. New York: Macmillan. p. 198. "charles babbage."
- Roscoe, Henry (1906). The Life and Experiences of Sir Henry Enfield Roscoe. London: Macmillan. "The Life & Experiences of Sir Henry Enfield Roscoe."

== Commemoration ==
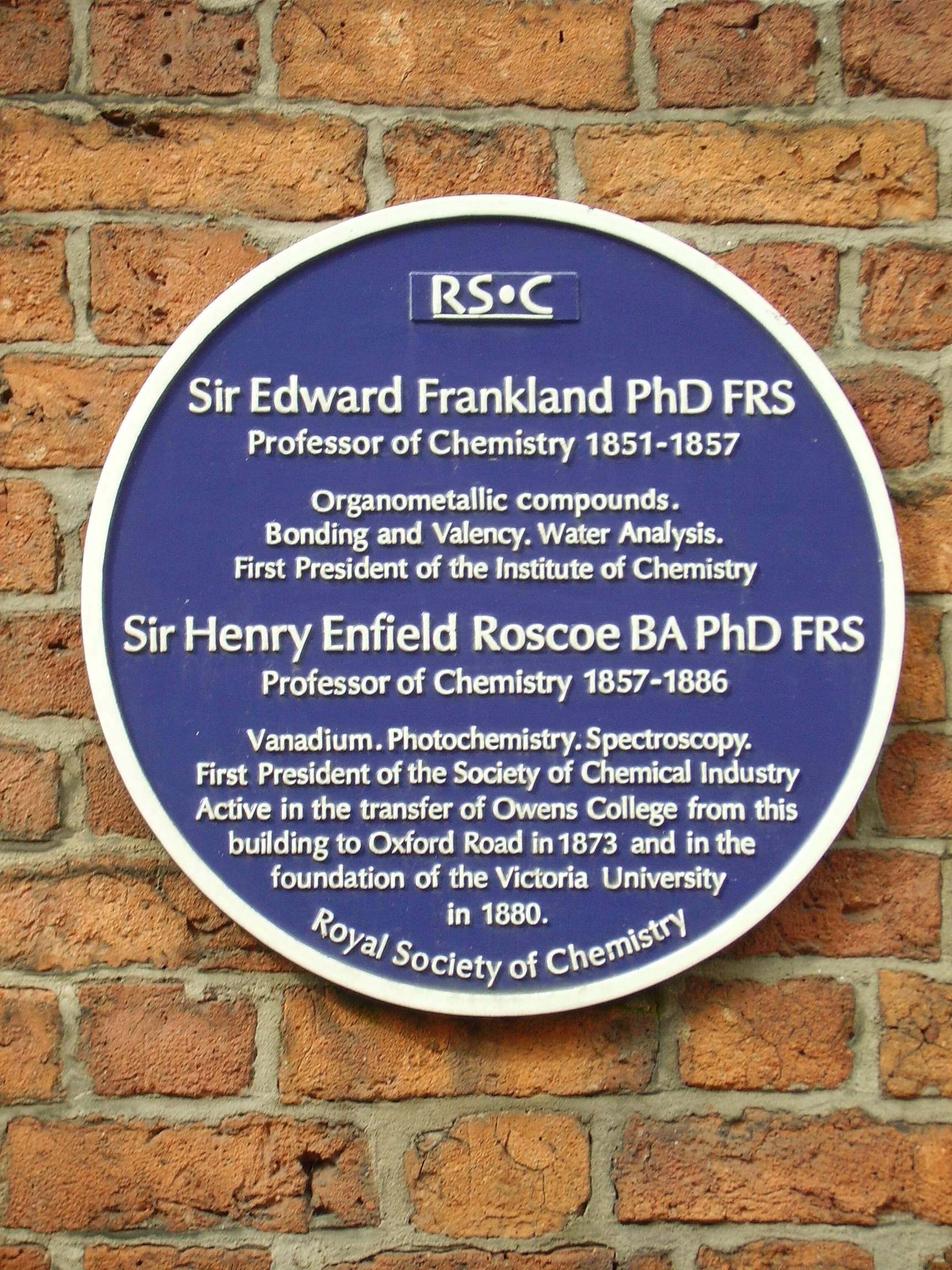
A blue plaque erected Quay Street, Manchester

The Roscoe Building at the University of Manchester was named after Professor Roscoe. It is a large general-purpose teaching facility used for various levels of teaching in Brunswick Street.

Parliament of the United Kingdom
New constituency	Member of Parliament for Manchester South; 1885 – 1895	Succeeded by Marquess of Lorne
Academic offices
Preceded by Sir Julian Goldsmid	Vice-Chancellor of University of London; 1896–1902	Succeeded by Dr Archibald Robertson
Professional and academic associations
Preceded by Edward William Binney	President of the Manchester Literary and Philosophical Society; 1882–84	Succeeded by William Crawford Williamson
Preceded by Richard Copley Christie	Secretary of the Manchester Literary and Philosophical Society; 1860–74	Succeeded by Joseph Baxendell
