= William of Shoreham =

William of Shoreham (fourteenth century) was an English poet.

Little is known of his life, but he probably lived in Shoreham, Kent and was vicar of Chart Sutton (near Leeds, Kent). Seven poems in English are attributed to him, all contained in a single manuscript now in the British Library (Add MS 17376). Four of the poems are didactic and address points of Christian doctrine, the other three are in praise of the Virgin Mary (one of them a translation from Robert Grosseteste's Latin). He was once thought to be the author of an English psalter, but this is now considered spurious.
