= Edward Enfield (philanthropist) =

British philanthropist (1811–1880)

Edward Enfield (1811–1880) was an English philanthropist.

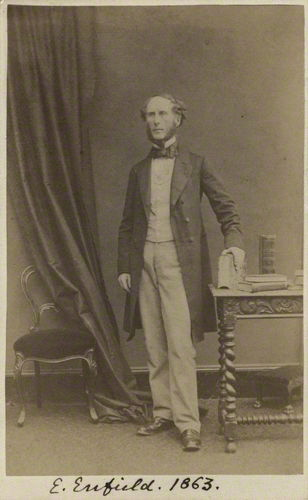
Edward Enfield, 1863 photograph by Ferdinand Jean de la Ferté Joubert.

== Life ==
Enfield was the third son of Henry Enfield, town clerk of Nottingham, and grandson of William Enfield. He was born at Nottingham on 15 May 1811, where eldest brother, William, was a leader in philanthropic efforts. Edward entered Manchester College, York, as a literary student in 1826; he was contemporary with Samuel Bache and Sir Thomas Baker of Manchester.

Through the influence of Henry Richard Vassall-Fox, 3rd Baron Holland he was appointed one of the moneyers of the Royal Mint. He was one of the most active members of the corporation, until, on the reorganisation of the Mint in 1851, he retired with a pension. From then on he gave his time to works of education and philanthropy. He was a member of the council and committee of management of University College, London (president of the senate from 1878), and of the council of University Hall, Gordon Square. From 1867 he acted as treasurer, and was the guiding spirit, of the University College Hospital; most of the sanitary and structural improvements in the hospital were under his supervision. As a Unitarian dissenter he took a large share in the conduct of the non-sectarian efforts for the elevation of the poor in East London, carried on by the Unitarian domestic mission society. In 1857 he was elected a trustee of the nonconformist endowments embraced in Dr. Daniel Williams's trust, and became a member of the estates and audit committees. At the time of his death he was president of Manchester New College, London.

He died at his residence, 19 Chester Terrace, Regent's Park, on 21 April 1880, and was buried at Woking cemetery on 26 April.

== Family ==
He was twice married: first in October 1848, to Honora, daughter of John Taylor, F.R.S., by whom he had one son; and secondly, to Harriet, daughter of Henry Roscoe of Liverpool, who survived him.

His descendants include the journalist Edward Enfield and his son, the comedian Harry Enfield.
