= The Cabinet Cyclopædia =

The Cabinet Cyclopædia was a book series of 133 volumes, edited by Dionysius Lardner.

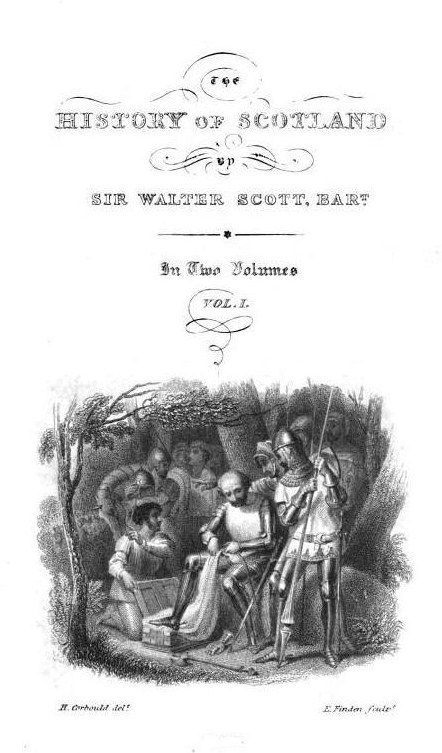
Illustration from the first volume of Lardner's Cabinet Cyclopædia, the History of Scotland by Walter Scott

== Background ==
During the first quarter of the 19th century, self-improvement literature became an important portion of the book market: "it was the age of the 'Family Library' edition". In his article on the Cabinet Cyclopaedia, Morse Peckham writes that this "revolution in literacy, [was] partly the result of the spread of liberal ideas by the French Revolution, [and] partly of the desire to combat those ideas by teaching the poor to read the Bible and religious tracts [... It] was to have an effect on modern society almost as profound as the industrial and agricultural revolutions". Dionysius Lardner's Cabinet Cyclopaedia, published between 1829 and 1846, was one of the most successful of these enterprises, which also included John Murray's Family Library and the publications of the Society for the Diffusion of Useful Knowledge. Although intended for the "general reader", the series was aimed specifically at the middle class rather than the masses: each volume cost six shillings, prohibiting purchase by the poor. The advertisements for the Cyclopaedia describe the expected audience as "merchants, captains, families, [and] new-married couples". The prospectus assured its readers that "nothing will be admitted into the pages of the 'CABINET CYCLOPAEDIA' which can have the most remote tendency to offend public or private morals. To enforce the cultivation of religion and the practice of virtue should be a principal object with all who undertake to inform the public mind."

== Plan ==
The series was divided into five "Cabinets": Arts and Manufactures, Biography, History, Natural History, and Natural Philosophy. The advertisement claimed these covered "all the usual divisions of knowledge that are not of a technical and professional kind". Unlike other encyclopedias of the time, Lardner's Cabinet Cyclopaedia arranged its articles topically rather than alphabetically. The series eventually contained 61 titles in 133 volumes and customers could purchase a single volume, a single cabinet, or the entire set. The first volume was published in December 1829 by Longman, Reese, Orme, Browne, Greene, and John Taylor. Thirty-eight identified authors contributed (others are unidentified); Mary Shelley was the only female contributor and the eighth most productive.

== Contributors ==
Reverend Dr. Dionysius Lardner, a science lecturer at University College London, started the Cabinet Cyclopaedia in 1827 or 1828. The authors who contributed to the volumes spanned the political spectrum and included many luminaries of the day. James Mackintosh, Walter Scott, Thomas Moore, and Connop Thirlwall wrote histories; Robert Southey wrote naval biographies; Henry Roscoe wrote legal biographies; John Herschel wrote on astronomy and the philosophy of science; August De Morgan wrote on mathematics; David Brewster wrote on optics; the poet John Holland wrote about metal manufacture in his native Sheffield; and Lardner himself wrote on mathematics and physics. Authors were usually paid about £200 for each volume, though some contracts were much higher or lower. For example, Irish poet Thomas Moore was contracted to write a two-volume History of Ireland for £1,500. One of the reasons the overall project ran into difficulty may have been that it overpaid well-known writers. Peckham speculates that the reason many of the famous writers listed on the prospectus never participated was because of the project's financial problems. The 19 substitute contributors were, he writes, "at the time and subsequently a far less distinguished group than Lardner had originally announced".

== Selling ==
The books were relatively expensive to print, because of the Corbould and Finden illustrations, the images for the scientific volumes, and the use of Spottiswoode's printing house. In order to cut costs, the publishers decided to use small print and narrow margins. An estimated 4,000 copies of the first edition of the early volumes were printed, but the print run would probably have fallen to 2,500 since the sales did not pick up after 1835. As it became clear that the series was not going to take off, fewer review copies were sent out and advertisements became smaller. Lardner's interest in the project may also have waned, as he paid less attention to its business dealings. However, some volumes of the Cabinet Cyclopaedia remained in print until 1890.

== Reception ==
Because of the popularity of encyclopedias at the beginning of the 19th century, the Cabinet Cyclopaedia did not receive enough critical notice to make it a bestseller. Often the reviews were "perfunctory". However, some individual writers received attention. Moore, for example, was given a front-page spread in the Literary Gazette for his history of Ireland. Shelley's volumes received 12 reviews in total—a good number—but "her name was never fully exploited" in the project; whether by her choice or Lardner's, it is unclear. Nevertheless, Peckham writes that "the Cyclopaedia on the whole was a distinguished and valuable work", and some of the individual volumes became famous.

== See also ==
- List of works in Lardner's Cabinet Cyclopædia

== Bibliography ==
- Crook, Nora. "General Editor's Introduction". Mary Shelley's Literary Lives and Other Writings. Vol. 1. Ed. Tilar J. Mazzeo. London: Pickering & Chatto, 2002. ISBN 1-85196-716-8.
- Kucich, Greg. "Mary Shelley's Lives and the Reengendering of History". Mary Shelley in Her Times. Eds. Betty T. Bennett and Stuart Curran. Baltimore: Johns Hopkins University Press, 2000. ISBN 0-8018-6334-1.
- Kucich, Greg. "Biographer". The Cambridge Companion to Mary Shelley. Ed. Esther Schor. Cambridge: Cambridge University Press, 2003. ISBN 0-521-00770-4.
- Peckham, Morse. "Dr. Lardner's Cabinet Cyclopaedia". The Papers of the Bibliographical Society of America 45 (1951): 37–58.
