= Biographia Juridica =

1870 biographical dictionary

Biographia Juridica: A Biographical Dictionary of the Judges of England from the Conquest to the Present Time, 1066-1870 is a dictionary of English judicial biography, written by Edward Foss. It was posthumously published in 1870. It includes more than sixteen hundred biographies, which are arranged in alphabetical order in one volume. Biographia Juridica includes biographies of the judges named in Foss' book The Judges of England, the final volume of which was published in 1864. Biographia Juridica also includes biographies of judges appointed since 1864.

== Reception ==
The Law Times said "it will occupy a prominent place in the lawyer's library". The Solicitors' Journal recommended the book to lawyers and antiquarians. Notes and Queries said the book was "calculated not only to give completeness to every legal library, but to form a necessary supplement to all our other" biographical dictionaries. The Examiner said the book was "a highly useful work, and, with some additions and improvements, would be all that could be desired in a work of the kind". The Spectator said the author's "extreme industry and wide research still give the prevailing tone to his pages". The Law Magazine said the book was interesting. The book was praised by Holdsworth.
