= Edward Enfield =

English television and radio presenter and newspaper journalist

Edward Richard Enfield (3 September 1929 – 21 February 2019) was an English television and radio presenter and newspaper journalist. He was the father of comedian Harry Enfield and novelist Lizzie Enfield.

== Biography ==
The son of Sir Ralph Roscoe Enfield, a senior civil servant at the Ministry of Agriculture (and a descendant of the nineteenth-century philanthropist Edward Enfield), and Doris Edith (née Hussey), a Girton College, Cambridge-educated writer, Edward Enfield was born on 3 September 1929 in Hampstead, London.

He was educated at Ashbury College in Ottawa, Ontario, Canada, Westminster School, London, and University College, Oxford. He had various jobs in industry, including with Cathay Pacific, until joining the education department of West Sussex County Council, where he became Assistant Director of Education. After overseeing the privatisation of school meals and cleaning services, he took early retirement and went on to present a radio travel programme from Ireland in 1994. He then appeared on BBC television with Anne Robinson on the consumer programme Watchdog and became a regular reporter on the show. He also appeared on Points of View, the Heaven and Earth Show, Through the Keyhole, daytime shows such as Richard & Judy and various holiday programmes.

Other radio programmes have included; Double Vision with Miles Kington, Free Spirits, and Enfield Pedals after Byron in which he cycled through Greece, following in the footsteps of Lord Byron.

For some years he wrote a regular column in The Oldie, and wrote many articles for national newspapers; he also wrote several books, including 'Downhill All the Way', 'Greece on my Wheels' and 'Freewheeling through Ireland'.

In 1956, Enfield married Deirdre Jenkins; they had a son, the comedian Harry Enfield, and three daughters, one of whom is the novelist Lizzie Enfield.

He died on 21 February 2019, aged 89.

== Work ==
=== Prose ===
- Enfield, Edward (1994). Downhill all the way. London: Bloomsbury.
- Enfield, Edward (2003). Greece on my wheels. Chichester: Summersdale.
- Enfield, Edward (2006). Freewheeling through Ireland. Chichester: Summersdale.
- Enfield, Edward (2008). Dawdling By The Danube. Chichester: Summersdale.
