= Edward Foss =

English lawyer and biographer

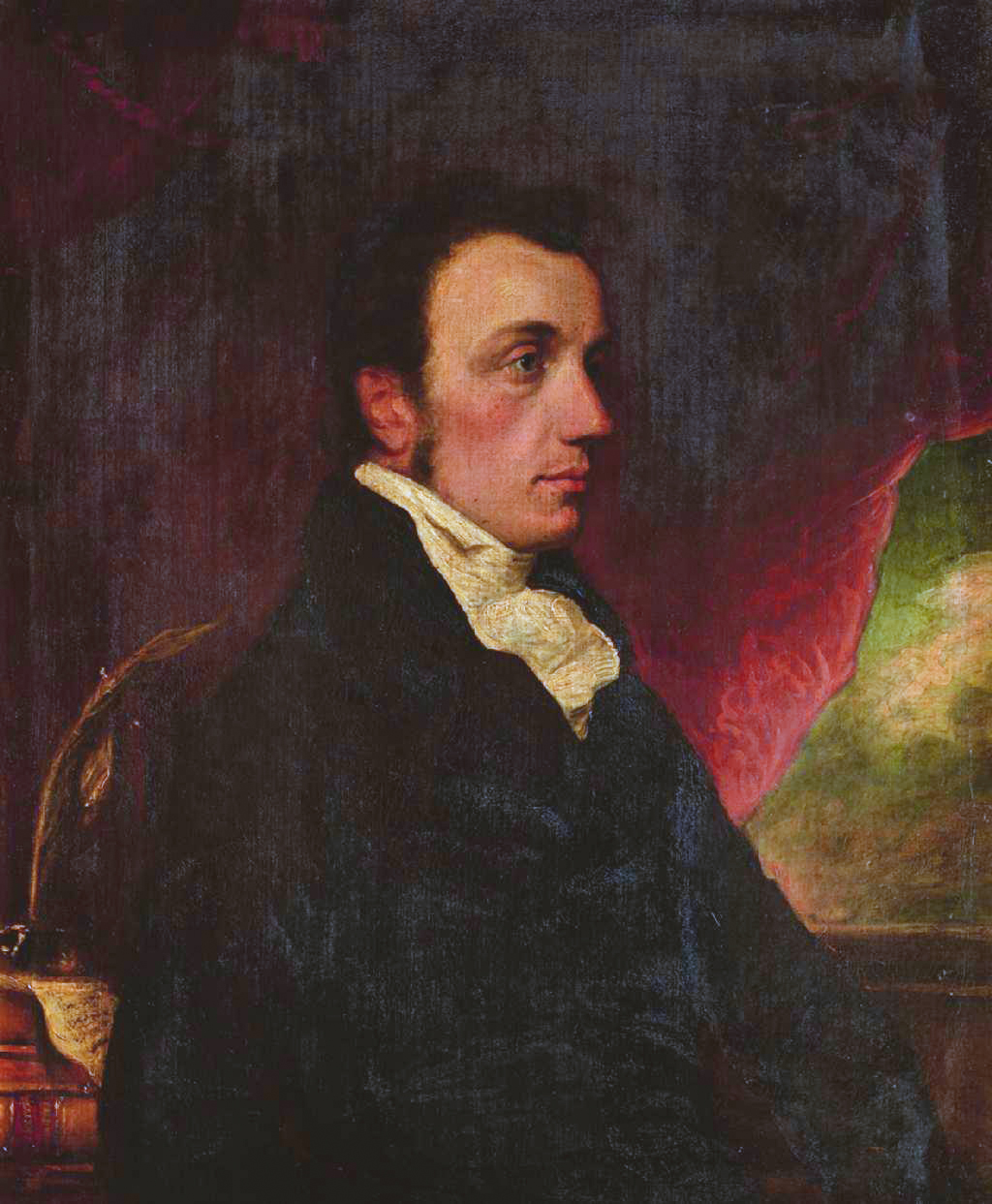
Edward Foss (Thomas Griffiths Wainewright, circa 1816)

Edward Foss (16 October 1787 – 27 July 1870) was an English lawyer and biographer. He became a solicitor, and on his retirement from practice in 1840, devoted himself to the study of legal antiquities. His Judges of England (9 vols., 1848–1864) was regarded as a standard work, characterized by accuracy and extensive research. Biographia Juridica, a Biographical Dictionary of English Judges, appeared shortly after his death.

== Life ==
He was the eldest son of Edward Smith Foss, solicitor, of 36 Essex Street, The Strand, London (d.1830), by Anne, his wife, daughter of Dr. William Rose of Chiswick, and was born in Gough Square, Fleet Street, 16 October 1787. He was educated under Dr. Charles Burney, his mother's brother-in-law, at Greenwich, and remained there until he was articled in 1804 to his father, whose partner he became in 1811. In 1822 he became a member of the Inner Temple, but never proceeded further towards a call to the bar.

On his father's death, in 1830, Foss moved to Essex Street, and carried on the practice alone until 1840, when he retired. During his professional career he had, owing to his literary tastes and connections, been specially concerned with questions relating to publishers and literary men. In 1827–8 he served the office of under-sheriff of London. He was connected with the Law Life Assurance Society from its foundation in 1823, first as auditor and afterwards as director, and was active in founding the Incorporated Law Society, of which he was president in 1842 and 1843. In 1844 he moved from Streatham to Canterbury, where he became chairman of the magistrates' bench, in 1859 to Dover, and in 1865 to Addiscombe.

He was elected a fellow of the Society of Antiquaries of London in 1822, was a member of the council of the Camden Society from 1850 to 1853, and from 1865 to 1870, a member of the Royal Society of Literature from 1837, and on the council of the Royal Literary Fund, and until 1839 secretary to the Society of Guardians of Trade. He died of apoplexy on 27 July 1870.

== Works ==
As a young man he contributed to periodicals: the Monthly Review, Aikin's Athenæum, the London Magazine, the Gentleman's Magazine, and the Morning Chronicle. In 1817 he published The Beauties of Massinger, and in 1820 an abridgment of William Blackstone's Commentaries, begun by John Gifford and published under his name, later translated into German. On retiring from professional practice he devoted himself to collecting materials for the history of the legal profession, which he lent to Lord Campbell for his Lives of the Chancellors. He published in 1843 The Grandeur of the Law, and in 1848 the first two volumes of the Judges of England appeared. The work was at first unsuccessful, but it rose in favour, and became a standard authority. In recognition Lord Langdale, to whom the first two volumes were dedicated, procured for him a grant of the entire series of publications of the Record Commission. The third and fourth volumes appeared in 1851, fifth and sixth in 1857, and seventh, eighth, and ninth in 1864.

In 1865 Foss published Tabulæ Curiales, and the printing of his Biographia Juridica—an abbreviation of his Judges of England—was in progress when he died.

Foss also contributed to the Standard. He was an original member of the Archæological Institute, and contributed a paper on Westminster Hall to its publication, Old London, 1867. He contributed to Archæologia papers ‘On the Lord Chancellors under King John,’ ‘On the Relationship of Bishop FitzJames and Lord Chief Justice Fitzjames,’ ‘On the Lineage of Sir Thomas More,’ and ‘On the Office and Title of Cursitor Baron of the Exchequer.’ For the Kent Archæological Association, which he helped to found, he wrote a paper ‘On the Collar of S.S.’; and a privately printed volume of poems, ‘A Century of Inventions,’ appeared in 1863.

== Family ==
He married in 1814 Catherine, eldest daughter of Peter Finch Martineau, by whom he had one son, who died in infancy, and in 1844 Maria Elizabeth, eldest daughter of William Hutchins, by whom he had six sons (of whom the eldest, Edward, a barrister, assisted in the preparation of the ‘Biographia Juridica’) and three daughters. One of his grandsons was the composer, critic, and publisher of music Hubert J. Foss.
