= Henry Roscoe (legal writer) =

British legal writer

Henry Roscoe (17 April 1800 – 25 March 1836) was an English barrister, legal writer, and biographer.

== Life ==
The youngest son of William Roscoe, he was born at Allerton Hall, near Liverpool, on 17 April 1800. He was educated by private tutors, and in 1817 was articled to Messrs. Stanistreet & Eden, solicitors, Liverpool. In January 1819 he moved to London and began studying for the bar, almost supporting himself by literary work. He was called to the bar at the Inner Temple in February 1826, and then practised in the northern circuit and at the Liverpool and Chester sessions. He was also assessor to the mayor's court, Liverpool, and a member of the municipal corporation's commission.

He died at Gateacre, near Liverpool, on 25 March 1836.

== Works ==
Roscoe wrote Lives of Eminent British Lawyers (1830), as one of the volumes of Lardner's Cabinet Cyclopædia, and The Life of William Roscoe (2 vols. 1833). His legal treatises were:

- A Treatise on the Law of Actions relating to Real Property, 1825, 2 vols.
- A Digest of the Law of Evidence on the Trial of Actions at Nisi Prius, 1827.
- A Digest of the Law Relating to Bills of Exchange, Promissory Notes, and Bankers' Checks, 1829.
- A Digest of the Law relating to Offences against the Coin, 1832.
- A General Digest of Decisions in the Courts for 1834, 1835, and 1836, 3 vols.
- A Digest of the Law of Evidence in Criminal Cases, 1835.
- On Pleading the General Issue since the new Rules, 1836.

Several of these works were often reprinted. He also brought out an edition of Roger North's Lives (1826, 3 vols), and was the joint editor of Price's Exchequer Reports for 1834–35.

== Family ==
By his marriage, on 29 October 1831, to Maria, second daughter of Thomas Fletcher and granddaughter of William Enfield, he had a son Henry Enfield Roscoe, and a daughter Harriet, who married Edward Enfield. Roscoe's widow, who died in April 1885, aged 86, published in 1868 Vittoria Colonna: her Life and Times about the Italian noblewoman and poet.
