= Legal biography =

Type of biography

Legal biography is the biography of persons relevant to law. In a preface dated October 1983, A. W. B. Simpson wrote that it was "a rather neglected field". Since then there has been a "resurgence of interest".

== History ==
In 1835, Hoffman said:

It is a useful as well as pleasing interest which we feel in the lives of distinguished personages, especially of such as have been eminent in our own particular pursuits. We believe most ambitious minds, in the first pantings after distinction, have proposed to themselves some illustrious character as a model, whose sentiments they have imbibed, whose maxims they have practised, whose very errors they have copied, with a thousand times more ardour than can ever be communicated by precept. Something of this we feel in reading of every eminent man: we rise from our book with more love for knowledge, more respect for genius, more resolution to be diligent, more confidence in the success of exertion: it is scarcely possible to contemplate such characters as Lord Hale and Sir William Jones, without a more zealous esteem of probity, and a consoling conviction of the prodigies which may be wrought by method and application; emotions similar to those we feel in remembering the heroes of classical literature on classical ground; and which prompted the great Roman orator and lawyer, when he declares the legal enthusiasm with which he called to mind the sages and orators of antiquity, amidst the streets and groves of their native city.

If this sort of enthusiasm were its only effect, legal biography might claim a place in the studies of law students, into whose pursuits despondence and fatigue are so apt to obtrude themselves. It appears too a very natural curiosity, to be inquisitive into the history, fortunes, reputation, and character of those who have imparted lustre to the profession of law, whose decisions or opinions have been handed down as worthy of a place in the body of the law, and in whose names we have a kind of interest and acquaintance, from their having so long been associated with our daily studies; besides that their history, connected as it sometimes is with the history of their own times, may shed light on the legal character, notions, and revolutions of their age. It may not, therefore, be unacceptable to add a list of such eminent lawyers, &c. as are worthy of a portion of the student's attention: by this we by no means desire the student to search after the voluminous biographies of personages, whose lives can be usefully summed up in the extent of a few lines. In this department of his studies, the student must generally be content with biographical sketches or notices, which, if well written, will be found to contain, in most cases, all that is essential. These brief notices may be found in such works as Lemprière's Universal Biography; Encyclopædia Britannica; Bayle's Dictionary; Encyclopædia Americana; Rees' Cyclopædia; Watt's Bibliotheca Britannica. Also in the various law journals and magazines, as in Hall's Law Journal; the English and American Jurist; the London Law Magazine, &c. Much useful matter, likewise, of this description, will be found in the work entitled Westminster Hall, 3 vols. 8vo. London, 1825; in Parke's History of the Court of Chancery; and especially in the British and American Reviews of legal and other works. We hope to be excused in referring the student, also, to the first volume of the author's Legal Outlines, for a number of biographical notices of eminent legal characters, and passim throughout the present volumes. We may farther remark, that many of the volumes of reports, and some of the law treatises, are accompanied with similar sketches, which the student should not fail to read.

Legal biography in England, as well as in our country, has attracted, until very recently, but little attention. Some very respectable biographies, however, of British, Continental, and American jurists have appeared.

== See also ==
- Biographia Juridica
