= Dionysius Lardner =

Irish science writer (1793–1859)

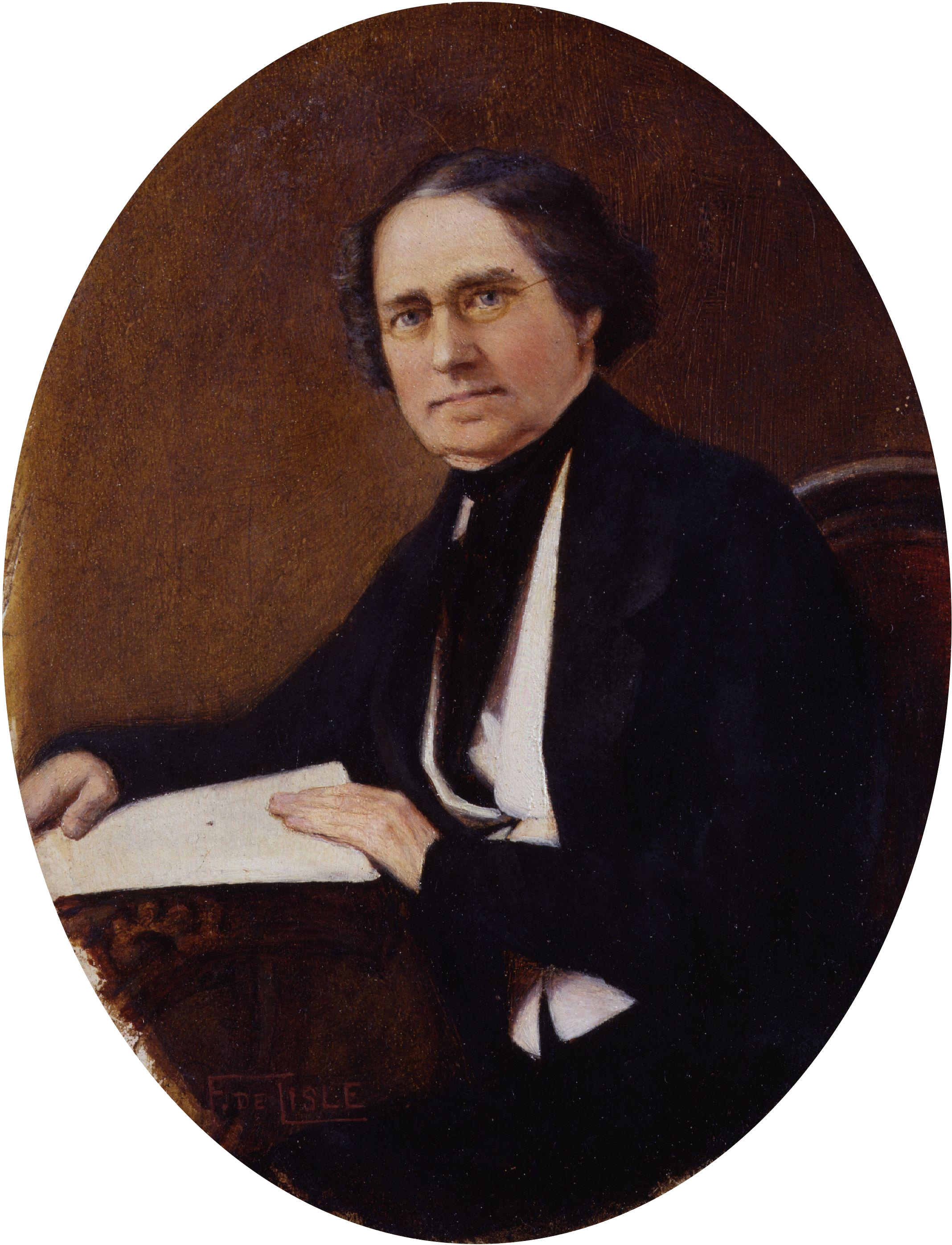
- Dionysius Lardner
- Born: 3 April 1793; Dublin, Ireland
- Died: 29 April 1859 (aged 66); Naples, Kingdom of the Two Sicilies
- Education: Trinity College, Dublin
- Known for: Cabinet Cyclopedia

Dionysius Lardner FRS FRSE (3 April 1793 – 29 April 1859) was an Irish scientific writer and science and technology populariser who edited the 133-volume The Cabinet Cyclopædia.

== Early life in Dublin ==
Lardner was born in Dublin on 3 April 1793 as the son of William Lardner and his wife; William was a solicitor in Dublin who wished his son to follow the same calling. After some years of uncongenial desk work, Lardner entered Trinity College, Dublin, in 1812. He obtained a B.A. in 1817 and an M.A. in 1819, winning many prizes.

Lardner married Cecilia Flood on 19 December 1815, but they separated in 1820 and were divorced in 1835. About the time of the separation, he began a relationship with a married woman, Anne Maria Darley Boursiquot, the wife of a Dublin wine merchant of Huguenot ancestry. It is believed that he fathered her son, Dion Boucicault, who became an actor and dramatist. Lardner provided him with financial support until 1840. While in Dublin, Lardner began to write and lecture on scientific and mathematical matters, and to contribute articles for publication by the Irish Academy.

== Career in London ==
In 1828, Lardner was elected professor of natural philosophy and astronomy at University College London, a position he held until he resigned his professorship in 1831.

Lardner showed himself to be a successful populariser of science, giving talks on contemporary topics such as Babbage's Difference Engine (1834). He was the author of numerous mathematical and physical treatises on such subjects as algebraic geometry (1823), differential and integral calculus (1825), and the steam engine (1828). He also wrote handbooks on various departments of natural philosophy (1854–1856). However, it is as the editor of The Cabinet Cyclopædia (1830–1844) that he is best remembered.

The Cabinet Cyclopædia eventually comprised 133 volumes, and many of the ablest savants of the day contributed to it. Sir Walter Scott contributed a history of Scotland and Thomas Moore contributed a history of Ireland. Connop Thirlwall provided a history of Ancient Greece and Robert Southey provided a section on naval history. Many eminent scientists contributed as well. Lardner himself was the author of the treatises on arithmetic, geometry, heat, hydrostatics and pneumatics, mechanics (in conjunction with Henry Kater) and electricity (in conjunction with Charles Vincent Walker).

The Cabinet Library (9 vols., 1830–1832), the Edinburgh Cabinet Library (38 vols., 1830–1844) and the Museum of Science and Art (12 vols., 1854–1856) were his other chief undertakings. A few original papers appear in the Royal Irish Academy's Transactions (1824), in the Royal Society's Proceedings (1831–1836) and in the Astronomical Society's Monthly Notices (1852–1853); and two Reports to the British Association on railway constants (1838, 1841) are from his pen.

== Involvement in scandal ==
In 1840, Lardner's career received a major setback as a result of his romantic involvement with Mary Spicer Heaviside, the wife of Captain Richard Heaviside of the Dragoon Guards. He had previously been married to Cecilia Flood from 1815 to their separation in 1820. Lardner ran off to Paris with Mary, pursued by her husband. When he caught up with them, Richard subjected Lardner to a flogging but was unable to persuade Mary to return with him. Later that year, he successfully sued Lardner for criminal conversation (also known as adultery) and received a judgment of £8,000.

The Heavisides were divorced in 1845, and in 1846 Lardner was able to marry Mary. The scandal caused by his affair with a married woman effectively ended his career in England, so Lardner and his wife remained in Paris until shortly before his death in 1859. He was able to maintain his career by lecturing in the United States between 1841 and 1844, which proved financially rewarding, realising £40,000.

Lardner died in Naples, Italy, and is buried in the English Cemetery there.

== Disagreements with Brunel ==
Lardner became involved in a number of ill-advised public disagreements with Isambard Kingdom Brunel regarding technical matters, in which he came off the worse. During 1833 Parliamentary hearings discussing the proposal of the Great Western Railway, Lardner criticised Brunel's design of the Box Tunnel. The tunnel had a 1-in-100 gradient from the east end to the west end. Lardner asserted that if a train's brakes were to fail in the tunnel, it would accelerate to over 120 mph (190 km/h), at which speed the train would break up and kill the passengers. Brunel pointed out that Lardner's calculations had made a basic error in totally disregarding air resistance and friction.

In 1836, when Brunel was proposing to build SS Great Western for the 3,500 mi (5,600 km) transatlantic passage to New York, Lardner stated at a meeting of the British Association for the Advancement of Science that:

As the project of making the voyage directly from New York to Liverpool, it was perfectly chimerical, and they might as well talk of making the voyage from New York to the moon... 2,080 mi (3,350 km) is the longest run that a steamer could encounter – at the end of that distance she would require a relay of coals.

Again, Brunel showed that Lardner's calculations were too simplistic. The principle that Brunel understood and Lardner did not was that the carrying capacity of a ship increases as the cube of its dimensions, while the water resistance only increases as the square of its dimensions. This meant that large ships were more fuel-efficient and could carry sufficient coal for the long voyage across the Atlantic. Brunel was proved right when the Great Western steamed into New York Harbour with 200 long tons (203 tonnes) of coal to spare.

In 1838, while Brunel was building the broad-gauge Great Western Railway, Lardner carried out some experiments with the company's flagship locomotive, North Star. He asserted that, while the engine was capable of hauling 82 long tons (83 tonnes) at 33 mph (53 km/h), it was only capable of hauling 16 long tons (16 tonnes) at 41 mph (66 km/h). He also recorded excessive fuel consumption at higher speeds. Lardner attributed this to the greater wind resistance of broad-gauge engines. Brunel and his assistant Daniel Gooch carried out their own experiments on the same locomotive and found that the only problem was that the blastpipe was too small. This was easily rectified, and the North Star's performance immediately improved. At the next meeting of the company's directors, Brunel triumphantly dismissed Lardner's claims.

== Contemporary influence ==
Lardner is mentioned in Karl Marx's Das Kapital and was well respected as an economist. He mixed with the rich and famous. He was involved in the founding of the University of London and was the first person to hold the post of Professor of Natural Philosophy and Astronomy there. He was influential in publicising Charles Babbage's Difference Engine.

While lecturing in America, Lardner was paid by Norris Locomotive Works, the largest firm of locomotive builders, to investigate a fatal accident in Reading where a boiler had exploded on a newly made train. Lardner pronounced that the accident had been caused by lightning, which meant that Norris Locomotive Works was not personally liable for the accident. A committee of the Franklin Institute pointed out that there had been no lightning present at that time and that the pumps had been faulty, the water indicator was ill-designed, and the bridge bands made of cast iron rather than wrought iron. The coroner's inquest jury was persuaded by Lardner that the accident was an act of God, but the company was nevertheless careful to design its later locomotives with wrought-iron bands.

== Selected publications ==
- (1828) Popular Lectures on the Steam Engine with James Renwick
- (1830) Mechanics with Captain Henry Kater
- (1830) The Western World Vol. 1 United States
- (1831) Poland
- (1831) Treatise on Algebraic Geometry
- (1831) A Treatise on Mechanics Vol. 1 with Captain Henry Kater
- (1831) A Treatise on... Silk Manufacture
- (1832) Treatise on Hydrostatics and Pneumatics with Benjamin Franklin Joslin
- (1832) History of Switzerland with Roy Gerald Fitzgerald
- (1832) Lectures on the Steam-engine
- (1834) An Historical View of the Progress of the Physical and Mathematical Sciences by Baden Powell
- (1836) The Steam Engine Familiarly Explained and Illustrated with James Renwick
- (1838) The History of Maritime and Inland Discovery Vol. 3
- (1840) The Steam Engine Explained and Illustrated
- (1842) Courses of Lectures: Delivered by Dionysius Lardner
- (1843) Lardner's Outlines of Universal History
- (1844) Investigation of the Causes of the Explosion of the Locomotive Engine, "Richmond"
- (1845) Popular Lectures on Astronomy with François Arago
- (1847) Encyclopaedia of Pure Mathematics with Peter Barlow, George Peacock
- (1848) The First Six Books of the Elements of Euclid
- (1849) Popular Lectures on Science and Art Vol. 1
- (1850) Railway Economy
- (1854) Hand-books of Natural Philosophy and Astronomy First Course
- (1855) Common Things Explained
- (1856) Steam and Its Uses
- (1857) A Rudimentary Treatise on the Steam Engine
- (1857) Natural Philosophy for Schools
- (1858) A Hand-book of Optics
- (1858) Hand-books of Natural Philosophy and Astronomy Vol. 1

== Bibliography ==
- A L Martin, Villain of Steam : A Life of Dionysius Lardner (1793-1859) (Carlow, Tyndall Scientific, 2015). References include:
  - Kieran Byrne, 'Mechanics's Institutes in Ireland before 1855' (thesis, University College Cork, 1976)
  - Richard Fawkes 'Dion Boucicault'
  - Norman McMillan 'Prometheus's Fire'
  - Mark Blaug (ed.) 'William Whewell (1794–1866), Dionysius Lardner (1793–1859), Charles Babbage (1792–1871)'; J.N. Hays article 'Dionysius Lardner' in the Dictionary of National Biography
  - Nora Crook's introduction to 'Mary Shelley's Literary Lives and other writings'
  - R. John Brockmann "Twisted Rails, sunken ships, the rhetoric of nineteenth century Steamboat and Railroad Accident Investigation Reports, 1833–1879" (2005).
  - Archives include Letters to Babbage, Letters in the Wellcome Library, including a 9-page autobiography in French, etc.
  - Peckham, Morse. "Dr. Lardner's Cabinet Cyclopaedia". The Papers of the Bibliographical Society of America 45 (1951): 37–58.
  - Andrew Odlyzko "Collective hallucinations and inefficient markets: The British Railway Mania of the 1840s" (2010)
- Martin, A. L.; de Paor, Annraoi (25 May 2015). Villain of Steam: A Life of Dionysius Lardner (1793-1859). Tyndall Scientific. ISBN 978-0993242007.
