= Harper's Family Library =

Harper's Family Library was an influential American book series published by the New York publisher J. & J. Harper, founded by brothers James and John Harper.

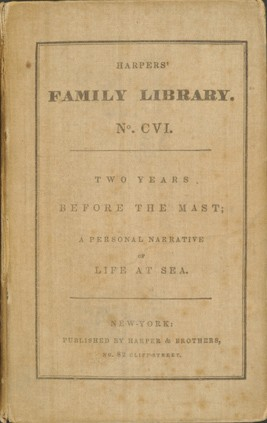
First edition of Two Years Before the Mast - A Personal Narrative of Life at Sea, 1840

== Introduction ==
Launched in 1830, the series was among the first major efforts in the United States to produce affordable, non-fiction books for a general audience. It was promoted as the “cheapest series of popular works ever published”, and over the years it grew to a total of 127 works included in 187 volumes.

The Family Library was published in the years 1830-1842 and focused on the principal fields of “useful knowledge,” such as history, voyages and travel, biography, natural history, physical sciences, agriculture, and the history of philosophy and religion. Its concept was based on the idea that the intellectual value of each individual volume was enhanced by being part of a broader, organized body of knowledge:

"It was suggested that the intellectual value of any one book was enhanced by its being part of an approved system or circle of knowledge."

The first volume in the series was The History of the Jews by Oxford historian Henry Hart Milman. According to Joseph Jacobs and S. J. Levinson, the work

"brought down on him the censure of the Church. This history is aggressively rationalistic; it treats the Jews as an Oriental tribe, and all miracles are either eliminated or evaded. He was nevertheless presented with a piece of plate by some representative Jews in recognition of his sympathetic attitude. His history was republished in 1863 and 1867."

A notable entry in the series was Richard Henry Dana Jr.'s Two Years Before the Mast (1840), which appeared as volume 106.

The series remains a significant example of early American publishing innovation and public education through literature. One hundred and ten of these works were reissued in the Harper's School District Library (SDL). The volumes of the Harper's Family Library (FL) are (mostly in shortened form):

== Volumes ==
- 001-003 Milman’s History of the Jews
- 004-005 Lockhart’s Life of Napoleon
- 006 Southey’s Life of Lord Nelson
- 007 William’s Life of Alexander
- 008, 074 Natural History of Insects
- 009 Galt’s Life of Lord Byron
- 010 Bush’s Life of Mohammed
- 011 Scott’s Letters on Demonology
- 012-013 Gleig’s History of the Bible
- 014 Leslie’s Discovery in the Polar
- 015 Croly’s Life of George IV
- 016 Jameson’s Discovery and Adventure in Africa (with James Wilson and Hugh Murray)
- 017-019, 066-067 Cunningham’s Lives of Celebrated Painters
- 020 James’s History of Chivalry and the Crusades
- 021-022 Bell’s Life of Mary Queen of Scots
- 023 Russell’s View of Ancient and Modern Egypt
- 024 Fletcher’s History of Poland
- 025 Smith’s Festivals, Games
- 026 Brewster’s Life of Sir Isaac Newton
- 027 Russell’s History of Palestine
- 028 Memes’s Memoirs of the Empress Josephine
- 029 Court and Camp of Napoleon
- 030 Lives and Voyages of Drake, Cavendish, Dampier
- 031 Barrow’s Pitcairn’s Island and the Mutiny
- 032, 072, 084 Turner’s Sacred History of the World
- 033-034 Jameson’s (Mrs.) Lives of Celebrated Female Sovereigns
- 035-036 Lander’s Travels in Africa
- 037 Abercrombie’s Essay on the Intellectual Powers
- 037 Maury’s Principles of Eloquence
- 038-040 St. John’s Lives of Celebrated Travelers
- 041-042 Dover’s Life of Frederick the Great
- 043-044 Smedley’s Sketches from Venetian History
- 045-046 Thatcher’s Indian Biography
- 047-049 Murray’s British India
- 050 Brewster’s Letters on Natural Magic
- 051-052 Taylor’s History of Ireland
- 053 Tytler’s Discovery in North America
- 054 Humboldt’s Travels and Researches
- 055-056 Euler’s Natural Philosophy
- 057 Mudie’s Guide to the Observation of Nature
- 058 Abercrombie’s Philosophy of the Moral feelings
- 059 Dick’s Improvement of Society
- 060 James’s History of Charlemagne
- 061 Russell’s Nubia and Abyssinia
- 062-063 Russell’s Life of Oliver Cromwell
- 064 Montgomery’s Lectures on Literature
- 065 Barrow’s Life of Peter the Great
- 068-069 Crichton’s History of Arabia
- 070 Fraser’s Historical and Descriptive Account of Persia
- 071 Combe’s Principles of Physiology
- 073 Russell’s History of the Barbary States
- 075-076 Paulding’s Life of Washington
- 077 Ticknor’s Philosophy of Living
- 078 Higgin’s Physical Condition of the Earth
- 079 Sforzosi’s History of Italy
- 080-081 Davis’s China and the Chinese
- 082 An Historical Account of the Circumnavigation of the Globe: and of the Progress of Discovery in the Pacific Ocean, from the Voyage of Magellan to the Death of Cook
- 083 Dick’s Celestial Scenery
- 085 Griscom’s Animal Mechanism
- 086-089 Tytler’s Universal History
- 092-093 Franklin Life and Writings of Franklin
- 094-095 Pursuit of Knowledge Under Difficulties
- 096-097 Paley’s Natural Theology
- 098 Rennie’s Natural History of Birds
- 099 Dick’s Sidereal Heavens
- 100 Upham on Imperfect and Disordered Mental Action
- 101-102 Murray’s Historical Account of British America
- 103 Lossing’s History of the Fine Arts
- 104 Rennie’s Natural History of Quadrupeds
- 105 Park, Life and Travels of Mungo Park
- 106 Dana’s Two Years Before the Mast
- 107-108 Parry’s Three Voyages to the North Pole
- 109-110 Life and Writings of Samuel Johnson
- 111 Bryant’s Selections from American Poets
- 112-113 Halleck’s Selections from British Poets
- 114-118 Keightley’s History of England
- 119-120 Hale’s United States
- 121-122 Irving’s Life and Writings of Oliver Goldsmith
- 123-124 Lives of Distinguished Men of Modern Times
- 125 Renwick’s life of De Witt Clinton
- 126-127 Mackenzie’s Life of O. H. Perry
- 128 Head’s Life of Bruce, The African Traveler
- 129 Renwick’s Life of John Jay and Alexander Hamilton
- 130 Brewster’s Lives of Galileo, Tycho Brahe, and Kepler
- 131 History of Iceland, Greenland, and the Faroe Islands
- 132 Siebold’s Japan and the Japanese
- 133 Dwight’s History of Connecticut
- 134-135 Bucke’s Ruins of Ancient Cities
- 136-137 History of Denmark, Sweden and Norway
- 138 Camp on Democracy
- 139 Lanman’s History of Michigan
- 140 Fenelon’s Lives of the Ancient Philosophers
- 141-142 Segur’s History of Napoleon’s Expedition to Russia
- 143-144 Henry’s Epitome of the History of Philosophy
- 145 Bucke’s Beauties, Harmonies and Sublimities of Nature
- 146 Lieber’s Essays on Property and Labor
- 147 White’s Natural History of Selborne
- 148 Wrangell’s Expedition to Siberia
- 149-150 Hazen’s Popular Technology
- 151-153 Spalding’s History of Italy
- 154-155 Lewis and Clarke’s Travels
- 156 Smith’s History of Education
- 157 Fraser’s History of Mesopotamia
- 158 Russell’s History of Polynesia
- 159 Davenport’s Perilous Adventures
- 160 Duer’s Constitutional Jurisprudence of the US
- 161-163 Belknap’s American Biography
- 164 Natural History of the Elephant
- 165 Potter’s Hand-book for Reader’s and Students
- 166 Graves’s (Mrs.) Woman in America
- 167-168 Stone’s Border Wars of the American Revolution
- 169 Vegetable Substances Used for the Food of Man
- 170 Michelet’s Elements of Modern History
- 171 Bacon’s Essays, and Locke on the Understanding
- 172 Voyages round the world, from the death of Captain Cook to the present time; including remarks on the social condition of the inhabitants in the recently-discovered countries: their progress in the arts; and more especially their advancement in religious knowledge
- 173 Murray’s Travels of Marco Polo
- 174-175 Sargent’s American Adventure by Land and Sea
- 176 Bunner’s History of Louisiana
- 177 Florian’s Moors in Spain
- 178 Lee’s Elements of Geology
- 179 Brougham’s Pleasures and Advantages of Science
- 180 Moseley’s Illustrations of Mechanics
- 181-182 Selections from the Spectator
- 183 Potter’s Political Economy
- 185 Robertson’s History of America Abridged
- 186 Robertson’s History of Charles V Abridged
- 187 Ferguson’s History of the Roman Republics Abridged

== See also ==
- The American School Library
- Society for the Diffusion of Useful Knowledge

== Literature ==
- Robert S. Freeman: “Harper and Brothers Family and School District Libraries, 1830–1846”, in: Libraries to the People: Histories of Outreach, herausgegeben von Robert S. Freeman, David M. Hovde (2003)
- Eugene Exman: The Brothers Harper: A Unique Publishing Partnership and its Impact Upon the Cultural Life of America from 1817 to 1853. 1965
- Joseph Henry Harper: The House of Harper: A Century of Publishing in Franklin Square. Harper & brothers, 1912
