= Harper's School District Library =

American book series

Harper's School District Library (SDL) was an influential American book series published from 1838 to 1846 by the New York publisher J. & J. Harper, founded by brothers James Harper (1795–1869) and John Harper (1797–1875).

== Introduction ==
As the other famous series of the publisher, the Family Library (FL), it was published since the 1830s, “at the dawn of mass-market publishing”.

As devout Methodists, the Harper brothers promoted reading as a means of moral uplift. As prominent publishers and key figures in the widespread religious and social reform movements of the era, they played a significant role in shaping education in American homes and schools.

According to the National Museum of American History, this portable library

“is typical of one that hung on school walls in the 1800s. In some schools, a portable library was purchased through community donations, while in others, an individual donated one.”

The School District Library consists of 210 titles in 295 volumes, more than half of these were duplicates of titles in the Family Library. The volumes of the School District Library are (partly in shortened form):

== Volumes ==
- 001-002 Paulding’s Life of Washington
- 003 Sedgwick’s (Miss) The Poor Rich Man and the Rich Poor Man
- 004-005 Swiss Family Robinson
- 006-007 Natural History of Insects
- 008 Hofland’s (Mrs.) The Son of a Genius
- 009-011 Robbin’s (Miss) Tales from American History
- 012 Thatcher’s Tales of the American Revolution
- 013-014 Lockhart’s Life of Napoleon
- 015 Combe’s (Andrew) Principles of Physiology
- 016-017 Thatcher’s Indian Traits
- 018 Jameson’s (Mrs.) Discovery and Adventure in Africa
- 019 Uncle Philip’s American Forest
- 020 Mudie’s Guide to the Observation of Nature
- 021 Perils of the Sea
- 022 Abercrombie’s Essay on the Intellectual Powers
- 023 Montgomery’s Lectures on Literature
- 024 Dick’s Celestial Scenery
- 025 Russell’s History of Palestine
- 026 James’s History of Chivalry and the Crusades
- 027 Brewster’s Life of Sir Isaac Newton
- 028 Sedgwick’s (Miss) Live and Let Live
- 029-030 Davis’s China and the Chinese
- 031 Circumnavigation of the Globe
- 032 William’s Life of Alexander
- 033-034 Euler's Natural Philosophy
- 035 Barrow’s Life of Peter the Great
- 036-037 Russell’s Life of Oliver Cromwell
- 038 Dick on the Improvement of Society
- 039 Higgins's Physical Condition of the Earth
- 040 Abercrombie’s Philosophy of the Moral feelings
- 041-042 Jameson’s (Mrs.) Lives of Celebrated Female Sovereigns
- 043 Uncle Philip's Conversations about the History of Virginia
- 044 Hughes’s (Mrs.) The Ornaments Discovered
- 045 Uncle Philip's Natural History
- 046-047 Uncle Philip's Whale Fishery and the Polar Seas
- 048 Lives and Voyages of Drake, Cavendish, Dampier
- 049-050 Dunlap’s History of New York
- 051-052 Franklin Life and Writings of Franklin
- 053-054 Buel’s Farmer's Instructor
- 055-056 Pursuit of Knowledge Under Difficulties
- 057 Griscom’s Animal Mechanism
- 058 Natural History of the Elephant
- 059 Vegetable Substances Used for the Food of Man
- 060-065 Tytler’s Universal History
- 066 Moseley’s Illustrations of Mechanics
- 067 Leslie and Jameson’s Discovery and Adventure in the Polar Seas and Regions
- 068-069 Paley’s Natural Theology
- 070-079 Sparks’s American Biography
- 080 Humboldt’s Travels and Researches
- 081 Goldsmith’s History of Greece
- 082 Rennie's Natural History of Birds
- 083 Familiar Illustrations of Natural Philosophy
- 084-085 Selections from the Spectator
- 086 Lee's Elements of Geology
- 087 Goldsmith’s History of Rome, abridged
- 088 Armstrong's Treatise on Agriculture
- 089 Rennie's Natural History of Quadrupeds
- 090 Chaptal's Chemistry Applied to Agriculture
- 091 Dwight’s Signers of the Declaration of Independence
- 092-095 Plutarch's Lives
- 096-097 Hale's United States
- 098 Brewster’s Letters on Natural Magic
- 099 Renwick’s Practical Mechanics
- 100-101 Parry's Three Voyages to the North Pole
- 102-106 Keightley's History of England
- 107-108 Mackenzie’s Life of O. H. Perry
- 109-110 Irving’s Life and Writings of Oliver Goldsmith
- 111-112 Murray’s Historical Account of British America
- 113 Upham on Imperfect and Disordered Mental Action
- 114 Bryant’s Selections from American Poets
- 115-116 Halleck’s Selections from British Poets
- 117 Florian's Moors in Spain
- 118-119 Lives of Distinguished Men of Modern Times
- 120 Nott's Counsels to Young Men
- 121 Head’s Life of Bruce, The African Traveler
- 122-123 Life of Dr. Johnson
- 124 Potter's Political Economy
- 125 Park, Life and Travels of Mungo Park
- 126 Brougham’s Pleasures and Advantages of Science
- 127 Dana’s Two Years Before the Mast
- 128 Uncle Philip's History of the Lost Colony of Greenland
- 129-130 Gaylord and Tucker's American Husbandry
- 131-132 Uncle Philip's History of Massachusetts
- 133-134 Uncle Philip's History of New Hampshire
- 135 Dick’s Sidereal Heavens
- 136 Renwick’s First Principles of Chemistry
- 137 Russell’s History of the Barbary States
- 138 Family Instructor. By a Parent
- 139 Dwight’s History of Connecticut
- 140 Sedgwick’s (Miss) Stories for Young Persons
- 141-143 Crowe's History of France
- 144-145 Scott's History of Scotland
- 146-148 Belknap's American Biography
- 149 Siebold’s Japan and the Japanese
- 150-151 Segur's History of Napoleon's Expedition to Russia
- 152 Brewster’s Lives of Galileo, Tycho Brahe, and Kepler
- 153-154 Sargent's American Adventure by Land and Sea
- 155 History of Iceland, Greenland, and the Faroe Islands
- 156 Fenelon's Lives of the Ancient Philosophers
- 157 Lossing’s History of the Fine Arts
- 158 Davenport's Perilous Adventures
- 159 Lanman’s History of Michigan
- 160-161 Bucke's Ruins of Ancient Cities
- 162 Lieber’s Essays on Property and Labor
- 163 Bucke's Beauties, Harmonies and Sublimities of Nature
- 164-165 History of Denmark, Sweden and Norway
- 166 White’s Natural History of Selborne
- 167 Wrangell’s Expedition to Siberia
- 168-169 Thatcher's Indian Biography
- 170 Bacon’s Essays, and Locke on the Understanding
- 171-172 Lander’s Travels in Africa
- 173 Memes’s Memoirs of the Empress Josephine
- 174-175 Henry's Epitome of the History of Philosophy
- 176 James’s History of Charlemagne
- 177-178 Hazen's Popular Technology
- 179 Scott’s Letters on Demonology
- 180 Bunner's History of Louisiana
- 181 Court and Camp of Napoleon
- 182 Fletcher's History of Poland
- 183 Maury’s Principles of Eloquence
- 184 Graves’s (Mrs.) Woman in America
- 185 Russell’s Nubia and Abyssinia
- 186 Barrow’s Pitcairn's Island and the Mutiny
- 187 Fraser’s Historical and Descriptive Account of Persia
- 188 Xenophon's History of the Expedition of Cyrus
- 189 Sismondi’s Italian Republics
- 190 History of Switzerland
- 191-195 Dunham's History of Spain and Portugal
- 196 Renwick's Natural Philosophy
- 197 Stowe’s (Mrs. H. B.) Mayflower
- 198-199 Lewis and Clarke's Travels
- 200 M’Intosh’s (Miss M. J.) Conquest and Self-Conquest
- 201 Fraser’s History of Mesopotamia
- 202 What's to be Done?
- 203-205 Spalding’s History of Italy
- 206 Seaward's Narrative of His Shipwreck
- 207 Tytler’s Discovery in North America
- 208 Wealth and Worth; or, Which makes the Man?
- 209 Smith's History of Education
- 210 Hofland’s (Mrs.) Young Crusoe
- 211 Cook's Voyages Around the World
- 212 Sedgwick’s (Miss C. M.) Means and Ends
- 213 Robertson's History of America Abridged
- 214 Ferguson's History of the Roman Republics Abridged
- 215 Sedgwick’s (Miss) Love Token
- 216 Paley's Evidences of Christianity
- 217 Johnson's Economy of Health
- 218 Day's Sandford and Merton
- 219 Robertson’s History of Charles V Abridged
- 220 Combe’s (George) The Constitution of Man
- 221 M’Intosh’s (Miss M. J.) Woman of Enigma
- 222 Butler's Analogy of Religion
- 223 Twin Brothers (by Madeline Leslie)
- 224 Russell's History of Polynesia
- 225 Goldsmith's Vicar of Wakefield
- 228 Cock's American Poultry-book
- 229-231 Cunningham’s Lives of Celebrated Painters
- 232 Duer’s Constitutional Jurisprudence of the US
- 233-234 Smedley’s Sketches from Venetian History
- 235 Howitt’s (Mary) Who shall be the Greatest?
- 236-237 Leland’s Demosthenes
- 238-240 Turner's Sacred History of the World
- 241 Michelet’s Elements of Modern History
- 242 Potter's Hand-book for Reader's and Students
- 243 Edgeworth’s (Miss) Rosamond
- 244-245 Edgeworth’s (Miss) Moral Tales
- 246-247 Whewell’s Elements of Morality and Polity
- 248 Dendy’s Philosophy of Mystery
- 249 Holmes’s Life of Mozart
- 250 Dick's Practical Astronomer
- 251-252 Mackenzie’s Life of Paul Jones
- 253 Parrott's Ascent of Mount Ararat
- 254 Feuerbach's Remarkable German Criminal Trials
- 255-256 Darwin’s Voyage of a Naturalist Round the World
- 257 Farnham’s (Mrs.) Life in Prairie Land
- 258 Barrow’s Three Voyages within the Arctic Regions
- 259 Somerville (Mary) on the Physical Sciences
- 260 Biblical Legends of the Mussulmans. Compiled by G. Weil
- 261 Bell’s Life of Rt. Hon. George Canning
- 262 Taylor’s Modern British Plutarch
- 263 Keppel’s Expedition to Borneo
- 264 Schiller’s Thirty Years' War
- 265 Moore’s Use of the Body in Relation to the Mind
- 266 Schiller’s History of the Revolt of the Netherlands
- 267-268 Salverte’s Philosophy of Magic
- 269 Francis’s Orators of the Age
- 270 Moore’s Power of the Soul Over the Body
- 271 Flowers of Fable
- 272 Ellis’s (Mrs.) Temper and Temperament
- 273 Voyages Round the World
- 274 M’Intosh’s (Miss) Praise and Principle
- 275 Murray’s Travels of Marco Polo
- 276 Cate’s (Miss E. J.) Year with the Franklins
- 277 Smith's Festivals, Games, and Amusements
- 278 Frost's Beauties of English History
- 279 M’Intosh’s (Miss) The Cousins
- 280 Frost's Beauties of French History
- 281 Isabel, or, the Trials of the Heart
- 282 History of the American Revolution: edited by Blake
- 283 Blake's Juvenile Companion and Fireside Reader
- 284 Parental Instruction
- 285-286 Bell’s Life of Mary Queen of Scots
- 287 Dana’s (Mrs.) Young Sailor
- 288 Alden’s Elizabeth Benton
- 289 Hutton's Book of Nature laid Open
- 290 Salkeld's Grecian and Roman Antiquities
- 291 Sketches of the Lives of Distinguished Females
- 293 Keeping House and Housekeeping
- 294 Horne’s New Spirit of the Age
- 295 Southey’s Life of Lord Nelson

== See also ==
- The American School Library

== Literature ==
- Robert S. Freeman: “Harper and Brothers Family and School District Libraries, 1830–1846”, in: Libraries to the People: Histories of Outreach, herausgegeben von Robert S. Freeman, David M. Hovde. Jefferson, N.C.: McFarland, 2003, pp. 26–49
- Eugene Exman: The Brothers Harper: A Unique Publishing Partnership and its Impact Upon the Cultural Life of America from 1817 to 1853. 1965
- Joseph Henry Harper: The House of Harper: A Century of Publishing in Franklin Square. Harper & brothers, 1912
