= Constable's Miscellany =

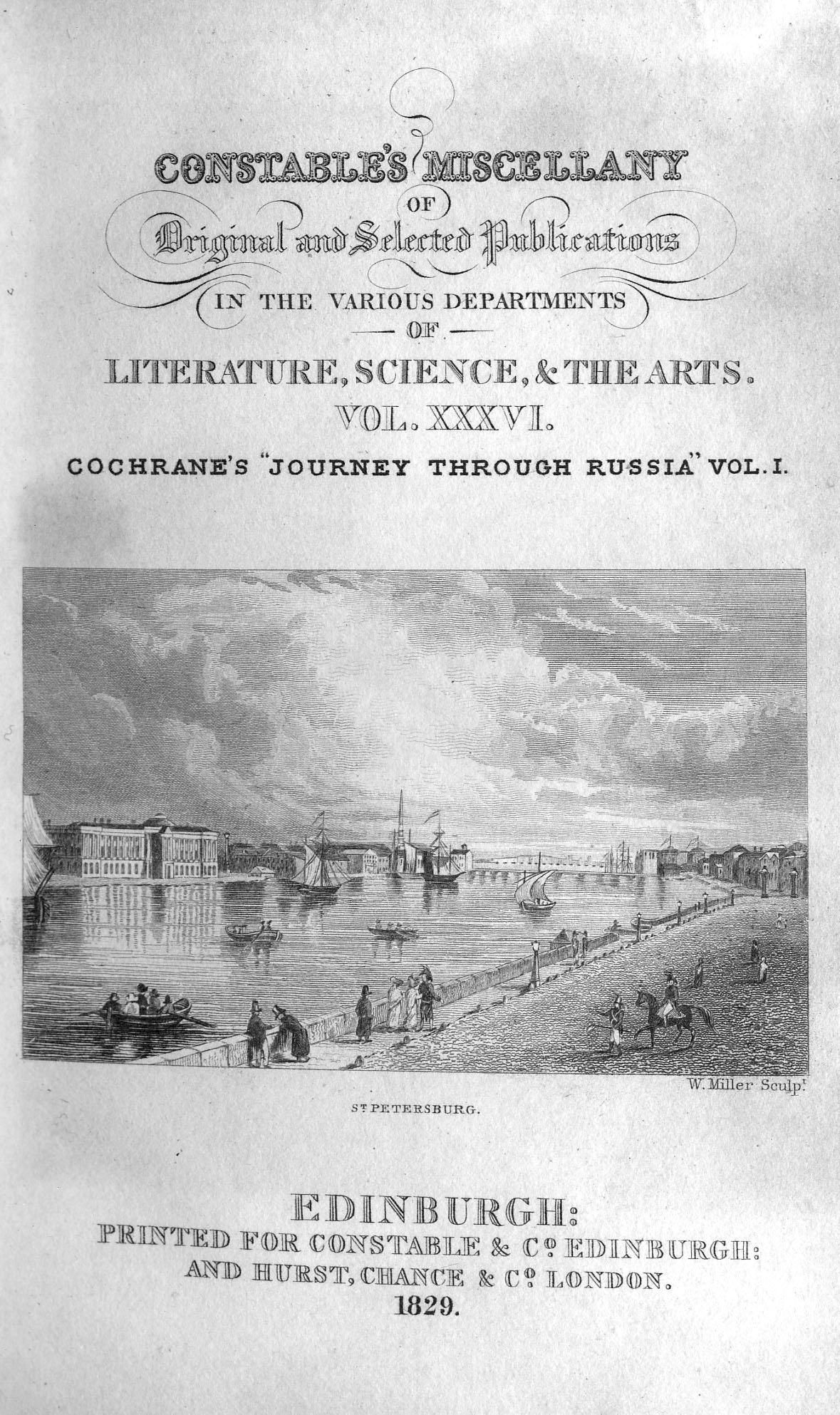
Constable's Miscellany volume XXXVI, engraving by William Miller

Constable's Miscellany was a part publishing serial established by Archibald Constable. Three numbers made up a volume; many of the works were divided into several volumes. The price of a number was one shilling. The full series title was Constable's Miscellany of Original and Selected Publications, in the Various Departments of Literature, Science, and the Arts.

Archibald Constable died in 1827, and the Miscellany was taken over by a consortium of Aitken, Henry Constable, and a London publisher. When the publisher went bankrupt in 1831, the project became relatively dormant. The entire list was later advertised by the London firm of Whittaker & Co. There were 80 volumes in all, the first appearing in 1826 and the last in 1835.

== Background and influence ==
Projected before the Panic of 1825, the Miscellany was dedicated to George IV of the United Kingdom, a privilege gained for Constable by Walter Scott. The initial plans were more ambitious; Constable himself became bankrupt in 1827, and this final project proceeded under constraints.

The Miscellany's first editor was John Aitken. As a series of less expensive contemporary non-fiction books for a popular audience, by a commercial publisher, it was the precedent for Murray's Family Library, which it anticipated by two years. It was recognised in the new genre, of "libraries of useful knowledge".

Constable's project is recognised as initiating a publishing phenomenon of the later 1820s. Cheap editions marketed as small libraries were seen also in the Library of Useful Knowledge, Library of Entertaining Knowledge, Lardner's Cabinet Cyclopædia, and series by Henry Colburn and Abraham John Valpy.

== List of Constable's Miscellany ==
Volume	Year	Author	Title
I	1826 (3 vols.)	Basil Hall	Voyage to Loo-Choo and other places in the Eastern Seas in the Year 1816
IV		Hugh Murray	Adventures of British Seamen
V		Walter Scott, introduction	Memoirs of the Marchioness of La Rochejaquelein
VI (2 vols.)	1827	Andrew Crichton	Converts from Infidelity
VIII (2 vols.)	1827	Michael Symes	An Account of an Embassy to the Kingdom of Ava in the Year 1795
X	1827	George Moir	Table Talk, or Selections from the Ana (i.e. -ana)
XI			Perils and Captivity
XII		Henry Glassford Bell (editor)	Selections of the Most Remarkable Phenomena of Nature
XIII (2 vols.)	1827	John Martin	An Account of the Natives of the Tonga Islands
XV (2 vols.)		Robert Chambers	History of the Rebellions in Scotland in 1745, 1746
XVII		Orlando W. Roberts	Voyages and Excursions in Central America
XVIII (2 vols.)		Friedrich Schiller; George Moir, translator	Historical Works
XX (2 vols.)		Richard Thomson	An Historical View of the Manner, Customs, Literature, &c., of Great Britain
XXII	1827		General Register of Politics, Science and Literature
XXIII		John Gibson Lockhart	Life of Burns
XXIV (2 vols.)		Henry Glassford Bell	Life of Mary, Queen of Scots
XXVI		Francis Wrangham	Evidences of Christianity
XXVII (2 vols.)		Adam Neale (two parts)	Memorials of the Late War
XXIX (2 vols.)		John Russell (brother of James Russell)	A Tour in Germany in 1820, 1821, 1822
XXXI (2 vols.)		Robert Chambers	History of the Rebellions in Scotland, under Montrose and Others, from in 1638 till 1660
XXXIII (3 vols.)		Christophe Guillaume de Koch; Andrew Crichton (translator)	History of the Revolutions in Europe
XXXVI (2 vols.)		John Dundas Cochrane	A Pedestrian Journey through Russia and Siberian Tartary
XXXVIII		Derwent Conway	Narrative of a Journey through Norway, Sweden and Denmark
XXXIX		John Smythe Memes	History of Sculpture, Painting, and Architecture
XL (2 vols.)		Edward Upham	History of the Ottoman Empire
XLII	1829	Robert Chambers	History of the Rebellions in Scotland under the Viscount of Dundee and the Earl of Mar in 1689 and 1715
XLIII (2 vols.)		John Parker Lawson	History of the Most Remarkable Conspiracies Connected with European History
XLV		Gilbert White	The Natural History of Selborne
XLVI		J. D. Sinclair	An Autumn in Italy
XLVII (2 vols.)	1829	Michael Russell	Life of Oliver Cromwell
XLIX		Telesforo de Trueba y Cosio	Life of Hernan Cortes
L (2 vols.)		Henry Stebbing	History of Chivalry and the Crusades
LII		William Cooke Stafford	History of Music
LIII (2 vols.)	1830	John Donald Carrick	Life of Sir William Wallace of Elderslie
LV (2 vols.)		Robert Chambers	Life of James the First
LVII (3 vols.)	1830	Fauvelet de Bourrienne; John Styles Memes (translator)	Memoirs of Napoleon Bonaparte
LX (2 vols.)		Thomas Keightley	History of the War of Independence in Greece
LXII		Telesforo de Trueba y Cosio	History of the Conquest of Peru by the Spaniards
LXIII (2 vols.)		Alexander Sutherland	The Achievements of the Knights of Malta
LXV		James Augustus St John	A Journal of a Residence in Normandy
LXVI (2 vols.)	1831	Derwent Conway	Switzerland, the South of France and the Pyrenees in MDCCC.XXX
LXVIII	1831 (4 vols.)	Alexander Wilson; Charles Lucian Bonaparte; Robert Jameson (editor)	The American Ornithology
LXXII	1831	John Styles Memes	Memoirs of the Empress Josephine
LXXIII (2 vols.)	1831	William Cooke Taylor	History of the Civil Wars in Ireland
LXXV	1832 (2 vols.)	Thomas Brown	The Book of Butterflies, Sphinxes and Moths
LXXVII	1832	Robert Mudie	A Popular Guide to the Observation of Nature
LXXVIII (2 vols.)	1833	Cyrus Redding	A History of Shipwrecks and Disasters at Sea
LXXX	1834	Thomas Brown	The Book of Butterflies, Sphinxes and Moths, vol. 3

== Revival of the series ==
"A version of the series was revived in the mid 1850s, the early 1880s, and, finally, in 1928..." The 1929 incarnation of the series was named "Constable's Miscellany of Original and Selected Publications in Literature" until about 1939.
