= Boy's and Girl's Library =

Boy's and girl's library of useful and entertaining knowledge was an American literary book series intended for young readers first published in 1833 by the New York publisher J. & J. Harper, founded by brothers James Harper (1795–1869) and John Harper (1797–1875). Subsequently volumes of the series were published into the 1890s.

== Introduction ==
As the other famous series of the publisher – the Family Library (FL) and the School District Library (SDL) – it was published since the 1830s, “at the dawn of mass-market publishing”.

As devout Methodists, the Harper brothers promoted reading as a means of moral uplift. As prominent publishers and key figures in the widespread religious and social reform movements of the era, they played a significant role in shaping education in American homes and schools. Most of the works were moralistic, didactic fiction. Besides original literatury, it contains also translations, for example The Swiss Family Robinson by Johann David Wyss, translated for the German (Der Schweizerische Robinson). Many of the volumes were written by the American writer, historian, educator and priest of the Episcopal Church Francis L. Hawks (1798–1866), using the pseudonym "Uncle Philip".

== Volumes ==
The volumes are (partly in shortened form):

- 1. Lives of the Apostles and Early Martyrs of the Church – by Anonymous
- 2–3. Swiss Family Robinson – by Johann David Wyss
- 4. Sunday Evening – by Uncle Philip
- 5. Son of a Genius – by Mrs. Barbara Hofland
- 6. Natural History; or, Uncle Philip's Conversations – by Anonymous (Frances Lister Hawkes)
- 7–8. Indian Traits – by Benjamin B. Thatcher
- 9–11. Tales from American History
- 12. Young Crusoe – by Mrs. Barbara Hofland
- 13. Sunday Evenings Vol. 2 – by Uncle Philip
- 14. Perils of the Sea – by Anonymous
- 15. Female Biography – by an American Lady
- 16. Caroline Westerly – by Anonymous
- 17. Clergyman's Orphan – by Anonymous
- 18. Sunday Evenings Vol. 3 – by Uncle Philip
- 19. Ornaments Discovered – by Mary Hughs
- 20. Uncle Philip’s Christianity
- 21. Uncle Philip’s Virginia
- 22. American Forest Uncle Philip on Trees
- 23–24. Uncle Philip’s New York
- 25. Revolutionary Tales – by Benjamin B. Thatcher
- 26–27. Uncle Philip's Whale Fishery and Polar Seas (2 vols.)
- 28. Uncle Philip’s Conversations about Lost Greenland
- 29–30. Uncle Philip’s Massachusetts (2 vols.)
- 31–32. Uncle Philip’s New Hampshire (2 vols.)

== Literature ==
- Robert S. Freeman: "Harper and Brothers Family and School District Libraries, 1830–1846", in: Libraries to the People: Histories of Outreach, herausgegeben von Robert S. Freeman, David M. Hovde. Jefferson, N.C.: McFarland, 2003, pp. 26-49
- Eugene Exman: The Brothers Harper: A Unique Publishing Partnership and its Impact Upon the Cultural Life of America from 1817 to 1853. 1965
- Joseph Henry Harper: The House of Harper: A Century of Publishing in Franklin Square. Harper & brothers, 1912
