= Rivingtons =

Rivingtons may refer to

- The Rivingtons, a 1960s doo-wop group
- Rivington or Rivington's, an English publishing house
