= Murray's Family Library =

Murray's Family Library was a series of non-fiction works published from 1829 to 1834, by John Murray II of the John Murray publishing house, in 51 volumes. The series editor was John Gibson Lockhart, who also wrote the first book, a biography of Napoleon. The books were priced at five shillings; Murray's approach, which did not involve part-publication, is considered a fundamentally more conservative business model, and intention, than used by the contemporary library of the Society for the Diffusion of Useful Knowledge.

== Original Library ==
| Volume | Year | Author | Title |
|---|---|---|---|
| I (2 vols.) | 1829 | John Gibson Lockhart | The Life of Napoleon Buonaparte |
| III | 1829 | John Williams | The Life and Actions of Alexander the Great |
| IV, X, XIII, XIX, XXVII, XXXVIII | 1829–31 | Allan Cunningham | Lives of the Most Eminent British Painters, Sculptors and Architects |
| V, VI and IX | Vol. V August 1829 | Henry Hart Milman | The History of the Jews |
| VII, LI | 1829 | Anonymous (a number of authors; Robert Ferguson) | The Natural History of Insects |
| VIII | 1829 | Anonymous (S. Dunham Whitehead) | The Court and Camp of Buonaparte |
| XI | 1830 | Washington Irving | The Life and Voyages of Christopher Columbus (abridged) |
| XII | 1830 | Robert Southey | The Life of Nelson, third edition |
| XIV | 1830 | Anonymous (William Macmichael and others; memoir of Caleb Hillier Parry by his son W. C. Parry) | Lives of Eminent British Physicians |
| XV, XLVIII, XLIX, L | 1830 | George Robert Gleig | The History of British India |
| XVI | 1830 | Walter Scott | Letters on Demonology and Witchcraft |
| XVII | 1830 | Francis Bond Head | Life of Bruce the African Traveller |
| XVIII | 1830 | Irving | Companions of Columbus |
| XX, XXXII | Vol. XX 1831 | Anonymous, (Edward Smedley) | Sketches from Venetian History |
| XXI | 1831 | Francis Palgrave | History of England |
| XXII, XXXIV, XXXVII | Vol. XXII 1831 | Patrick Fraser Tytler | Lives of Scottish Worthies |
| XXIII | 1831 | Anonymous (John Barrow) | Family Tour through South Holland |
| XXIV | 1831 | David Brewster | Life of Sir Isaac Newton |
| XXV | 1831 | Sir John Barrow, 1st Baronet | The Eventful History of the Mutiny and Piratical Seizure of HMS Bounty |
| XXVI (2 vols.) | Vol. XXVI December 1831 | John James Blunt | Reformation in England |
| XXVIII (3 vols.) | 1832 | John Lander and Richard Lander, editor Alexander Bridport Becher | Adventures in the Niger |
| XXXI | 1832 | Anonymous (Charles Edward Dodd) | The Trials of Charles I, and of some of the Regicides |
| XXXIII | 1832 | Brewster | Letters on Natural Magic |
| XXXV | 1832 | Sir John Barrow | Life of Peter the Great |
| XXXVI | 1832 | Henry Nelson Coleridge | Six Months in the West Indies |
| XXXIX (2 vols.) | 1834 | Irving | Sketch Book |
| XLI (6 vols.) | 1834 | Alexander Fraser Tytler | Universal History |
| XLVII | 22 September 1834. | Crofton Croker | Fairy Legends and Traditions of the South of Ireland, 2nd edition illustrated by Daniel Maclise |

== Subsequent additions ==
In 1834 Murray sold out to Thomas Tegg. Further volumes were added to the Library, under Tegg's management. There was a total of 80 volumes, by 1847.

| Volume | Year | Author | Title |
|---|---|---|---|
| LII | | Daniel Defoe | History of the Plague Notes by E. W. Brayley |
| LIII (2 vols.) | | Cyrus R. Edmonds | Life and Times of George Washington |
| LV | | Irving | Knickerbocker's History of New York |
| LVI (3 vols.) | | John Wesley | A Compendium of Natural Philosophy |
| LIX (2 vols.) | | Philippe-Paul de Ségur | Bonaparte's Campaigns in Russia |
| LXI | 1837 | Richard Alfred Davenport | Life of Ali Pasha, of Tepelini |
| LXII | | Charles Macfarlane | Lives and Exploits of Banditti and Robbers |
| LXIII | | Davenport | Sketches of Imposture, Decepture and Credulity |
| LXIV | 1838 | Davenport | History of the Bastile |
| LXV | | James Francis Hollings | Life of Gustavus Adolphus |
| LXVI | | Richard Thomson | Chronicles of London Bridge |
| LXVII | | Charles Bucke | Life of John Churchill, Duke of Marlborough |
| LXVII | 1839 | Thomas Roscoe | The Life and Writings of Miguel de Cervantes (1839), based on Martín Fernández de Navarrete. |
| LXIX | 1839 | Hollings | Cicero's Life |
| LXX (2 vols.) | 1840 | Bucke | Ruins of Ancient Cities |
| LXXII | 1840 | William Edmonstoune Aytoun | Life and Times of Richard I |
| LXXIII | 1840 | Samuel Green | Life of Mahomet |
| LXXIV (2 vols.) | | Davenport | Narrative of Perils and Sufferings |
| (3 vols.) | 1841 | John Chetwode Eustace | Classical Tour through Italy, 8th edition |
| LXXIX | | Davenport | Lives of Individuals who have Raised Themselves from Poverty to Eminence or Fortune |
| LXXX | 1842 | Anonymous (William Johnson Neale) | History of the Mutiny at Spithead and the Nore |
