= Robert Ferguson (physician) =

Scottish physician

- Born: 1799; India
- Died: 25 June 1865 (aged 65–66); Winkfield, Berkshire, England
- Occupation: physician

Robert Ferguson M.D. (1799–1865) was a Scottish physician.

== Life ==
Ferguson was the son of Robert Ferguson of Glen Islay, Perthshire. He was born in India. He went to school at Croydon under Alexander Crombie, author of the Gymnasium, and began to study medicine as the pupil of one of his relatives, a practitioner in Soho, and in attendance at the lectures of the Great Windmill Street school of anatomy. After an interval of general study at Heidelberg, he joined the medical classes at Edinburgh and graduated M.D. in 1823.

Family connections brought him into social contact with Sir Walter Scott, and his reminiscences of Scott's circle were included in The Records of the Clan and Name of Ferguson, Fergusson and Fergus edited by James Ferguson and John Menzies Fergusson (1895). On proceeding to London he brought with him an introduction from John Gibson Lockhart to Mr. Murray of Albemarle Street, who introduced him to literary circles in the metropolis. After travelling abroad for a time as medical attendant, he took the post of resident medical officer at the Marylebone Infirmary, where he learned from Dr. Hooper 'many of those strange resources and prescriptions on which, to the surprise of many of his contemporaries, he was wont to rely with entire confidence in some of the greatest emergencies of medical practice'. With the support of Robert Gooch he entered on special obstetric practice, was appointed physician to the Westminster Lying-in Hospital, and professor of obstetrics at the newly founded King's College in 1831. In 1827 he had been active in founding the London Medical Gazette as an organ of conservative opinion in medical politics and of academical views in medical science. Along with Watson he attended Scott in 1831 when he passed through London in broken health on his way to Naples, and again in 1832 on his way back.

He became a fellow of the College of Physicians in 1837, and afterwards councillor and censor. In 1840 he was appointed physician-accoucheur to Queen Victoria, in which capacity he attended, along with Sir Charles Locock, at the birth of all her majesty's children.

About 1857 he gradually withdrew from his extensive obstetric practice, and became a general medical consultant. He died at his cottage at Winkfield, Berkshire, on 25 June 1865.

== Works ==
For Murray's Family Library he afterwards compiled two volumes, anonymously, on the Natural History of Insects, and for the Quarterly Review he wrote ten articles from 1829 to 1854, most of them medical, and one or two of a philosopho-religious kind. His first publication, dated in 1825 from Baker Street, was a letter to Sir Henry Halford proposing a combination of the old inoculation of smallpox with vaccination.

His professional writings belong to the earlier period of his practice: Puerperal Fever 1839; Diseases of the Uterus and Ovaria in Tweedie's Library of Medicine; and an edition of Gooch's papers on the Diseases of Women, with concise introductory essay, for the New Sydenham Society, 1859.

== Family ==
He married, first, in 1830, Cecilia Labalmondiere from a French family, who died without issue in 1842. Secondly, he married in 1846, Mary, daughter of Macleod of Dunvegan, by whom he had five children.
