= Rivington's Theological Library =

Rivington's Theological Library was a series of 15 volumes, edited by William Rowe Lyall and Hugh James Rose, and published in London during the 1830s by Rivington's. Rose as founder intended "to restore in England the tradition of the primitive church and revive a taste for patristic studies." His quest for contributors took him to Oxford in 1832, at a pivotal moment for what would become the Tractarian movement.

A work by John Henry Newman, The Arians of the Fourth Century (1833), was intended for the Library. Lyall, however, had objections, to its theology and its scope (Newman had been assigned the topic of Church Councils of the period), and it was published by Rivingtons, but outside the Library. Rose told Newman privately that the series was playing too safe, and was not making its mark. A further work, commissioned from Joseph Blanco White, and announced as a History of the Inquisition, as Newman's had been intended as a History of the Principal Councils, took its own way, and became a work Observations on Heresy and Orthodoxy (1835) with a Unitarian aspect. Other announced volumes, by Rose on Martin Luther, and by James Nichols on Hugo Grotius, did not appear in the series.

Number	Year	Author	Title
I	1832	Life of Wiclif	Charles Webb Le Bas
II		The Consistency of the Whole Scheme of Revelation	Philip Nicholas Shuttleworth
III		History of the Reformed Religion in France I	Edward Smedley
IV		The Life of Archbishop Cranmer I	Le Bas
V		The Life of Archbishop Cranmer II	Le Bas
VI		History of the Reformed Religion in France II	Smedley
VII		Scripture Biography I	Robert Wilson Evans
VIII		History of the Reformed Religion in France III	Smedley
IX		History of the Church in Scotland I	Michael Russell
X		History of the Church in Scotland II	Russell
XI		Life of Bishop Jewel	Le Bas
XII	1835	Scripture Biography II	Evans
XIII		Life of Archbishop Laud	Le Bas
XIV	1837	Biography of the Early Church I	Evans
XV	1839	Biography of the Early Church II	Evans
