= Henry Herbert Southey =

Henry Herbert Southey M.D. (1784–1865) was an English physician.

== Life ==
The son of Robert Southey (1745–1792) by his wife, Margaret Hill (1752–1802), and younger brother of Robert Southey, the poet, he was born in Bristol on 18 January 1784. After education at private schools in and near Great Yarmouth, his brother Robert proposed to establish him in his house in London in order that he might study anatomy under Sir Anthony Carlisle at Westminster Hospital. The project fell through, and Henry studied surgery at Norwich under Philip Meadows Martineau (d. 1828), uncle of Harriet Martineau and one of the most distinguished Lithogists of his day - the two surgeons maintaining their professional relationship throughout their careers. At Norwich Southey also he met William Taylor of Norwich, who interested him in other studies.

In November 1803 he entered the University of Edinburgh, where Sir William Knighton and Dr. Robert Gooch were his fellow students and friends. He had acquired facility in colloquial Latin, and used to talk it with his friends. He graduated M.D. on 24 June 1806, reading a dissertation ‘De ortu et progressu syphilidis’ (Edinburgh, 1806), in which he maintained the American origin of syphilis. He then studied for a winter in London, and settled in the following year at Durham; but moved back to London by the advice of Sir William Knighton in 1812.

He became a licentiate of the Royal College of Physicians on 22 December 1812, and was elected a fellow on 25 June 1823. On 25 April 1825 he was elected a Fellow of the Royal Society. He delivered the Harveian oration in 1847, was elected physician to the Middlesex Hospital on 17 August 1815 and held office till April 1827. He was appointed physician in ordinary to George IV in 1823, in 1830 physician extraordinary to Queen Adelaide, and in 1833 lord chancellor's visitor in lunacy. He became a commissioner in lunacy in September 1836, and was Gresham Professor of Medicine from 1834 to 1865.

On 16 June 1847 he was created hon. D.C.L. at Oxford. He lived in Queen Anne Street, Cavendish Square.

He died at 1 Harley Street on 13 June 1865, and was buried in Highgate Cemetery.

== Family ==
He married his first wife, Mary Harriet Sealy at Liverpool in 1809. She was born in 1784 in Portugal, the daughter of Richard and Elizabeth Sealy. Mary died at Durham on 19 June 1811, aged 27, and was buried at St Oswalds, Durham.

Southey married his second wife Louisa Gonne in Streatham in 1815. She was extremely beautiful and highly accomplished. She died post-partum on 12 January 1830 in Harley Street, London, leaving seven young children.

He married his third wife Clara Latham in 1831. She was mother to physician Reginald Southey. Clara died in 1858, aged 60, and was buried at Highgate Cemetery.

== Works ==
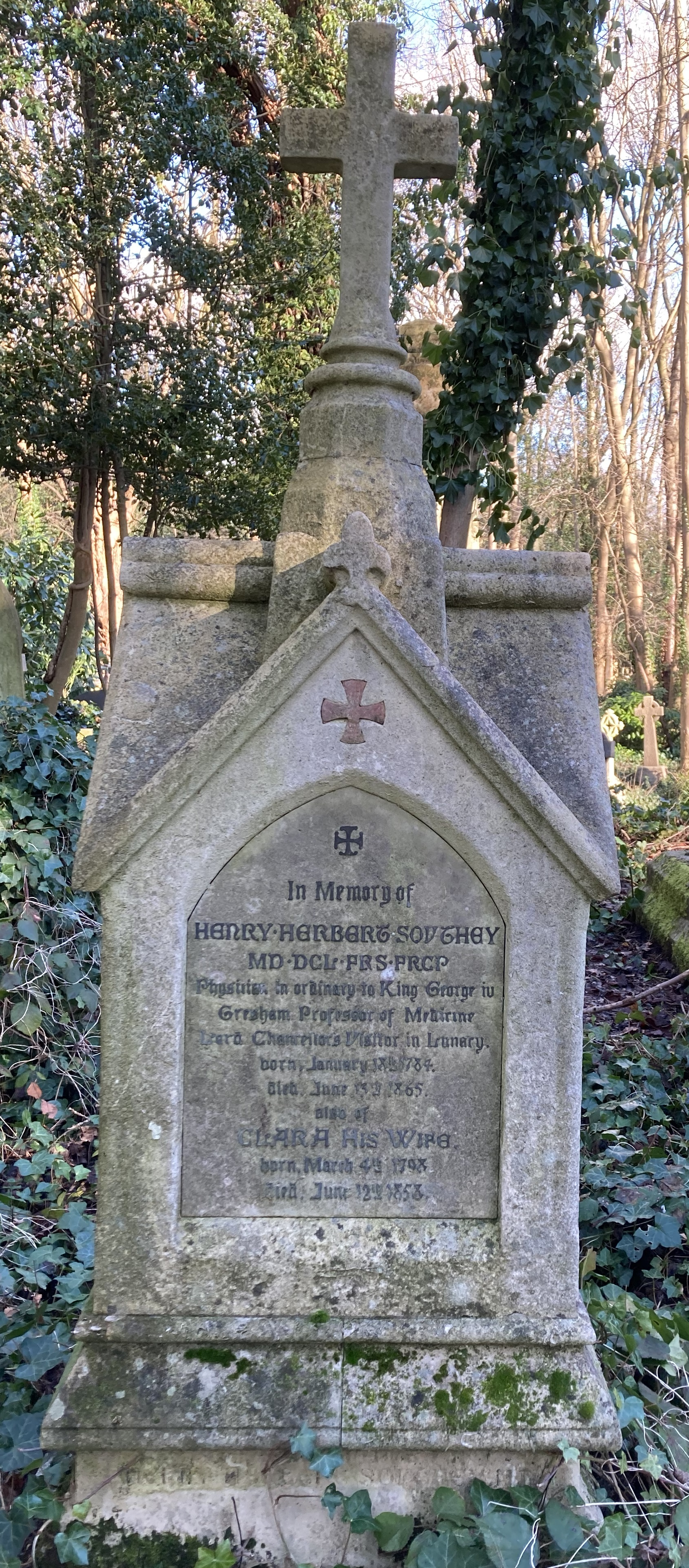
Southey's tombstone in Highgate Cemetery

In 1814, Southey published ‘Observations on Pulmonary Consumption’. He also wrote the life of Gooch in the ‘Lives of British Physicians,’ published in 1830 (see William Macmichael), and made contributions to periodicals.
