= Robert Evans (Archdeacon of Westmorland) =

English cleric and author

Robert Wilson Evans (30 August 1789 – 10 March 1866) was an English cleric and author, Archdeacon of Westmorland from 1856 until the year before his death a decade later.

== Life ==
Evans was born at the Council House, Shrewsbury, the second son of John Evans, M.D., of Llwynygroes, near Oswestry, by his wife, Jane Wilson. He was educated under Samuel Butler at Shrewsbury School, and proceeded to Trinity College, Cambridge in 1807. There he became seventh wrangler, second chancellor's medallist, and B.A. 1811, M.A. 1814, and B.D. 1842. Having obtained a Trinity fellowship in 1813, he was elected classical tutor of the college in the following year, having George Peacock, afterwards Dean of Ely, as his colleague. In 1836 his former headmaster Samuel Butler, then bishop of Lichfield, made him his examining chaplain, and collated him to the vicarage of Tarvin, Cheshire. Here he found parish work in abundance, the experience of which is given in his Bishopric of Souls.

Trinity College had the right to nominate a candidate to the benefice of Heversham (then in Westmorland, now in Cumbria). Evans became vicar there in 1842. One of his first acts was to build a new vicarage house on the shoulders of Heversham Head, a spot from which he commanded a most extensive view. He was appointed Archdeacon of Westmorland in 1856, resigning the position in January 1865 because of his age. He died at Heversham vicarage 10 March 1866 aged 76.

== Works ==
Evans was the author of:

- A Course of Sermons preached before the University of Cambridge, 1830.
- The Rectory of Valehead, 1830; 12th edition 1842.
- The Church of God, in a series of Sermons, 1832.
- A Sermon at the Consecration of the Bishop of Lichfield and Coventry, 1836.
- A Sermon at the Ordination held by the Bishop of Lichfield, 1838.
- Hymns for the Christian Workman, 1840.
- Tales of the Ancient British Church, 1840; 3rd edition 1859.
- An Appeal against the Union of the Dioceses of Bangor and St. Asaph, 1842.
- The Bishopric of Souls, 1842; 5th edition 1877.
- A Sermon, 1842.
- A Day in the Sanctuary, with a Treatise on Hymnology, 1843.
- Parochial Sermons, 3 volumes, 1844–55.
- Consideration on the Scriptural Practice of Church Collections, 1847.
- The Ministry of the Body, 1847.
- A Visitation Sermon, 1849.
- Parochial Sketches, in verse, 1850.
- A Treatise on Versification, 1852.
- An Exhortation to the Lord's Day, 1853.
- Charges delivered to the Clergy of Westmoreland, 2 vols., 1856, 1857.
- Self-Examination and Proof, a sermon, 1856.
- Daily Hymns, 1860.
- England under God, 1862.
- A Sermon on Death of the Prince Consort, 1862.

He also wrote five volumes in Rivington's Theological Library: vols. vii. xii. and xvi., Scripture Biography, 1834, and vols. xiv. and xv., Biography of the Early Church, 1836.
