= Erskine Neale =

English clergyman and author

Erskine Neale (1804–1883) was an English clergyman and author.

== Life ==
Born on 12 March 1804, he was son of Adam Neale and Margaret Young, and brother of William Johnson Neale. He was educated at Westminster School 1815–16, and at Emmanuel College, Cambridge, where he graduated B.A. 1828, and M.A. 1832.

On 24 June 1828 Neale became lecturer of St. Hilda's Church, Jarrow, county Durham. He was appointed vicar of Adlingfleet, Yorkshire, on 19 October 1835, rector of Kirton, Suffolk, in 1844, and vicar of Exning with Lanwade, Suffolk, in 1854.

Neale collected autographs. His knowledge of handwriting led to his being subpœnaed on the part of the crown at the trial of Ryves v. the Attorney-General in June 1866, when it was sought without success to establish the claim of Olivia Serres, the mother of Lavinia Ryves, to be the Princess Olive of Cumberland. He died at Exning vicarage on 23 November 1883, after an incumbency of 29 years.

== Works ==
In his day Neale was a well-known author. His major work was The Closing Scene, or Christianity and Infidelity contrasted in the Last Hours of Remarkable Persons (1st ser., 1848; 2nd ser., 1849); it ran to several editions, and was reprinted in America. He was also author of:

- The Living and the Dead, 1827; 2nd ser., 1829.
- Reason for Supporting the Society for the Propagation of the Gospel in Foreign Parts, 1830.
- Sermons on the Dangers and Duties of a Christian, 1830.
- Whychotte of St. John's, or the Court, the Camp, the Quarter-Deck, and the Cloister, 1833, 2 vols.
- The Life-Book of a Labourer: Essays, 1839; 2nd edit., 1850.
- The Bishop's Daughter, 1842; 2nd edit., 1853.
- Self-Sacrifice, or the Chancellor's Chaplain, 1844; 2nd edit., 1858.
- Experiences of a Gaol Chaplain, 1847, 3 vols.; three editions. This was a work of fiction.
- The Track of the Murderer marked out by an Invisible Hand: Reflections suggested by the Case of the Mannings, 1849. On the Marie Manning murder case.
- Scenes where the Tempter has triumphed, 1849.
- The Life of Edward, Duke of Kent, 1850; 2nd edit., 1850.
- The Earthly Resting Place of the Just, 1851.
- The Riches that bring no Sorrow, 1852.
- The Summer and Winter of the Soul, 1852.
- Risen from the Ranks, or Conduct versus Caste, 1853.
- My Comrade and my Colours, or Men who know not when they are beaten, 1854.
- The Old Minor Canon, or a Life of Struggle and a Life of Song, 1854; 2nd edit., 1858.
- Sunsets and Sunshine, or Varied Aspects of Life, including notices of Lola Montes, James Neild, William Hone, and William Cobbett, 1862.

== Notes ==
Attribution

This article incorporates text from a publication now in the public domain: Lee, Sidney, ed. (1894). "Neale, Erskine". Dictionary of National Biography. Vol. 40. London: Smith, Elder & Co.
