= Adam Neale =

Scottish army physician and author

Adam Neale M.D. (born 18th century – died 23 December 1832) was a Scottish army physician and author.

== Life ==
He was born in Scotland and educated in Edinburgh, where he graduated M.D. on 13 September 1802, his thesis being published as Disputatio de Acido Nitrico, Edinburgh. He was admitted a licentiate of the Royal College of Physicians, London, on 25 June 1806, and during the Peninsular War acted as physician to the forces, being also one of the physicians extraordinary to the Duke of Kent. Neale subsequently visited Germany, Poland, Moldavia, and Turkey, where he was physician to the British embassy at Constantinople.

About 1814, Neale was in practice at Exeter, but moved to Cheltenham in 1820. There he provoked a controversy, and in a few months returned to Exeter. In 1824, he was an unsuccessful candidate for the office of physician to the Devon and Exeter Hospital. He went to London, and resided for some time at 58 Guilford Street, Russell Square.

Neale was a fellow of the Linnean Society of London. He died at Dunkirk on 22 December 1832.

== Works ==
Neale published in 1809 Letters from Portugal and Spain, an account of the operations of the armies under Sir John Moore and Sir Arthur Wellesley, from the landing of the troops in Mondego Bay to the battle of Coruña. In 1818, he published Travels through some parts of Germany, Poland, Moldavia, and Turkey. At Cheltenham, he published a pamphlet in which he cast a doubt on the genuineness of the waters as served to visitors at the principal spring: A Letter to a Professor of Medicine in the University of Edinburgh respecting the Nature and Properties of the Mineral Waters of Cheltenham, London, 1820. It was answered by Dr. Thomas Jameson of Cheltenham, in Fact versus Assertion, by William Henry Halpin the younger, and in A Letter by Thomas Newell. The controversy ended with the satirical Hints to a Physician on the opening of his Medical Career at Cheltenham, Stroud, 1820.

Neale also published:

- The Spanish Campaign of 1808, contributed to vol. xxvii. of Constable's Miscellany, Edinburgh, 1828, which is entitled Memorials of the late War, 2 parts.
- Researches respecting the Natural History, Chemical Analysis, and Medicinal Virtues of the Spur or Ergot of Rye when administered as a Remedy in certain States of the Uterus, London, 1828.
- Researches to establish the Truth of the Linnæan Doctrine of Animal Contagions, London, 1831.

Neale also translated from the French of Paolo Assalini Observations on … the Plague, the Dysentery, the Ophthalmy of Egypt, London, 1804.

== Family ==
Erskine Neale and William Johnson Neale were his sons. Neale's daughter Sydney married Samuel Rowe.

== Notes ==
Attribution

This article incorporates text from a publication now in the public domain: Lee, Sidney, ed. (1894). "Neale, Adam". Dictionary of National Biography. Vol. 40. London: Smith, Elder & Co.
