= John Aitken (editor) =

Scottish journalist (1793–1833)

John Aitken (25 March 1793 – 15 February 1833) was a Scottish journalist, editor and bookseller. He was editor of Constable's Miscellany.

== Biography ==
Aitken was born at the village of Camelon, Stirlingshire on 25 March 1793. After a good elementary school education, he became clerk in the East Lothian Bank, whence he was transferred to the bank of Mr. Park (brother of Mungo Park, the traveller) at Selkirk. Subsequently, he became teller in the East Lothian Bank, but on its failure he, in 1822, removed to Edinburgh, where he commenced business as a bookseller, and published the 'Cabinet,’ a selection of miscellaneous pieces in prose and verse, which extended to three volumes, and met with considerable success. Shortly after this he was appointed editor of Constable's Miscellany. On the death of Constable he, in conjunction with Messrs. Hurst, Chance, & Co., of London, and Henry Constable, purchased the work, but his connection with it ceased after the failure of the London firm in 1831. He had established a printing-office, with the view of starting a publication similar to the 'Miscellany,’ when he died somewhat suddenly, 15 February 1833. Aitken took an active part in founding the Edinburgh Literary Journal. He was an occasional contributor to periodicals, and wrote verse with elegance and taste.
