= Caleb Sprague Henry =

American clergyman and author

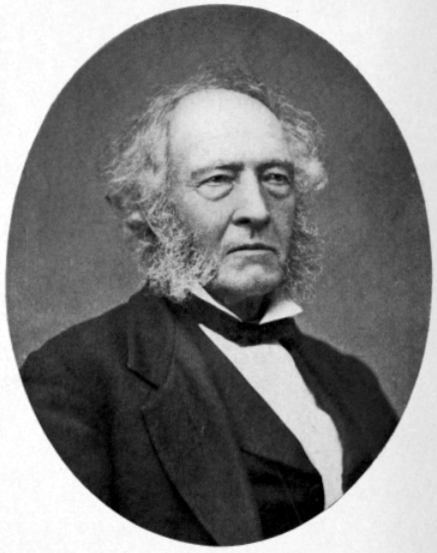
- Born: August 2, 1804; Rutland, Massachusetts
- Died: March 9, 1884 (aged 79); Newburgh, New York
- Education: Dartmouth College
- Occupations: Clergyman, writer

Caleb Sprague Henry (1804–1884) was an American Protestant Episcopal clergyman and author.

== Biography ==
Caleb Sprague Henry was born in Rutland, Massachusetts, on August 2, 1804. He graduated from Dartmouth College in 1825 and studied theology at Andover Theological Seminary and New Haven.

In 1828 he became a Congregational minister at Greenfield, Massachusetts, and in 1833 removed to Hartford, Connecticut. In 1834 he started the American Advocate of Peace, the organ of the American Peace Society.

In 1835 he entered the ministry of the Protestant Episcopal church. He also became professor of moral and intellectual philosophy in Bristol College, Pennsylvania (1835–1838). In 1837, with the aid of Rev. Francis L. Hawks, he established the New York Review. He was professor of history and philosophy in New York University from 1839 to 1852.

Later he was rector of various churches, but was chiefly engaged in literary work. He translated Guizot's History of Civilization and other works from the French and was the author of several works, including Compendium of Christian Antiquities (1837), Social Welfare and Human Progress (1860), and Satan as a Moral Philosopher (1877).

He died in Newburgh, New York, on March 9, 1884.
