= Robert Gooch =

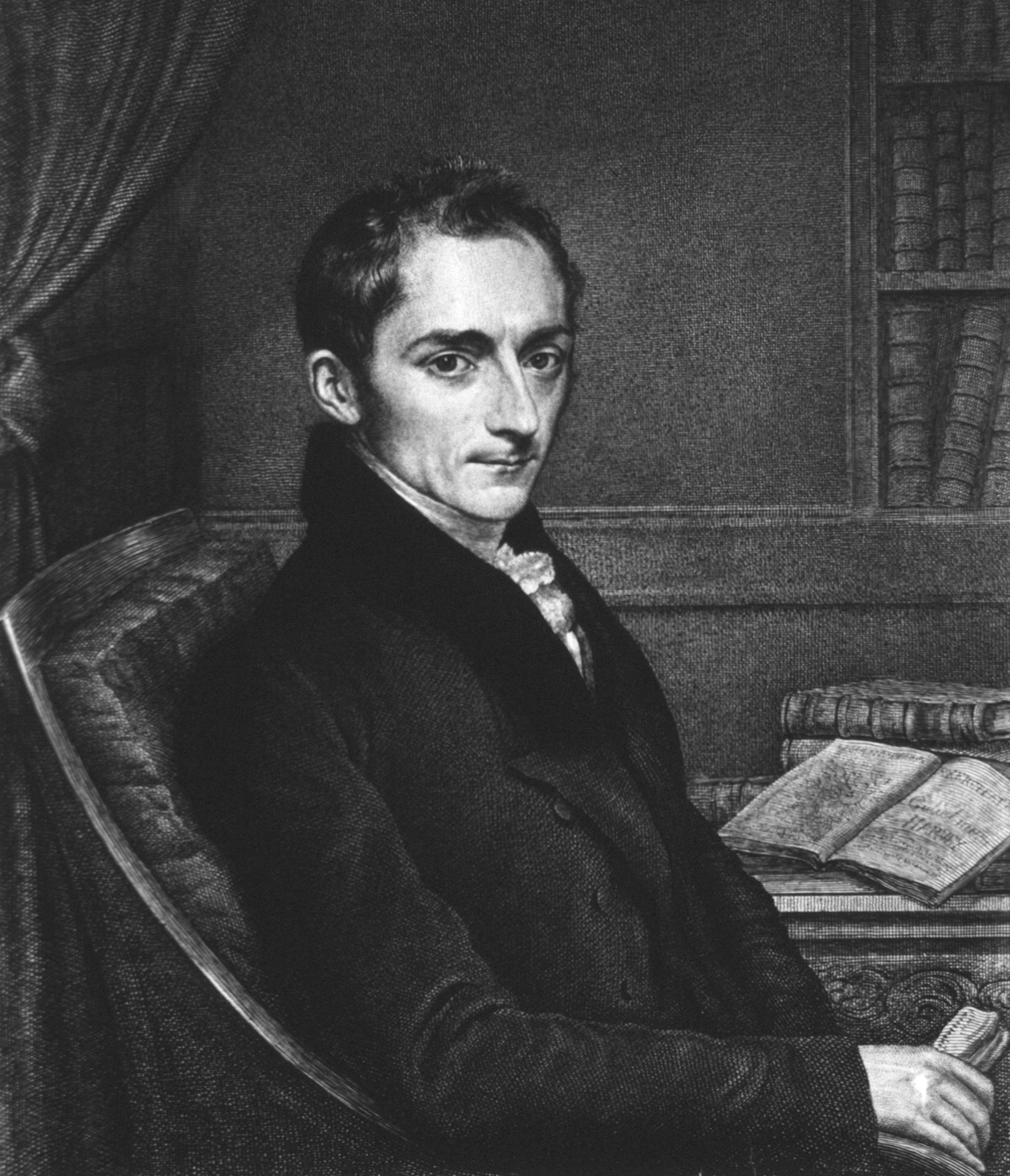
Robert Gooch

Robert Gooch, M.D. (January 1784 – 16 February 1830) was an English medical doctor.

== Life ==
Born at Great Yarmouth, Norfolk, in June 1784, he was son of Robert Gooch, a sea captain who was a grandson of Sir Thomas Gooch. He was educated at a private day school, and when fifteen was apprenticed to Giles Borrett, surgeon-apothecary at Yarmouth. When Horatio Nelson came to visit the wounded of the battle of Copenhagen, Gooch went round the Yarmouth Hospital with him.

In 1804 he went to the University of Edinburgh, where among his friends were Henry Southey and William Knighton. In his vacations he studied German at Norwich with William Taylor, and became engaged to Emily Bolingbroke. He graduated M.D. June 1807, his inaugural dissertation being on rickets. After a tour in the Scottish Highlands, and some further holiday in Norfolk, he came to London, worked under Astley Cooper, and in 1808 began general practice at Croydon, Surrey. He then married the lady to whom he had been engaged for four years. She died in January 1811, and her child in July of the same year.

He left Croydon, took a house in Aldermanbury, and after a tour during which he came to know Robert Southey at Keswick, he was admitted a licentiate of the Royal College of Physicians on 6 March 1812. Shortly he was elected lecturer on midwifery at St. Bartholomew's Hospital. In January 1814 he married the sister of Benjamin Travers the surgeon, and in 1816 went to live in Berners Street, where his practice in midwifery and the diseases of women soon became large.

His health was poor, and often obliged him to suspend his work. In January 1826 he had hæmoptysis, and in April of that year his friend Sir William Knighton procured for him the post of librarian to the king.

Confined to bed by consumption, he died 16 February 1830, leaving two sons and a daughter. His portrait by Richard James Lane, given by his daughter, is at the College of Physicians in London.

== Works ==
He wrote in the London Medical Record. In 1829 Gooch finished at Brighton the ‘Account of some of the most Important Diseases peculiar to Women,’ which is his major work. During one of his journeys abroad for his health he wrote the letters on Beguines and Nursing, printed in the appendix to Southey's Colloquies on Society. In the Quarterly Review he wrote an article on the plague (December 1825) and another on the Anatomy Act (January 1830). His papers were edited, with a revision of his treatise on the diseases of women, by Robert Ferguson, London, 1859.
