= Reginald Southey =

English physician and inventor (1835–1899)

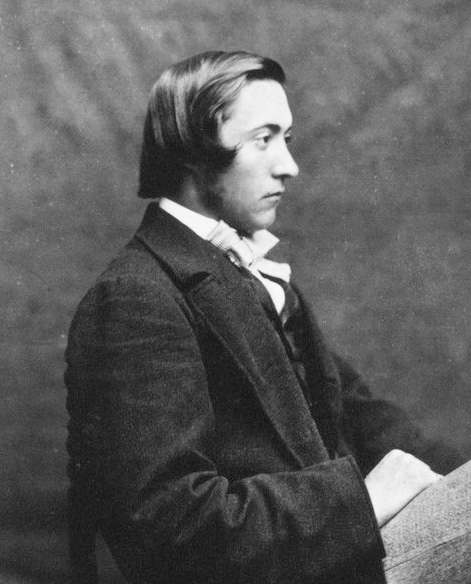
Reginald Southey by Lewis Carroll, 1860

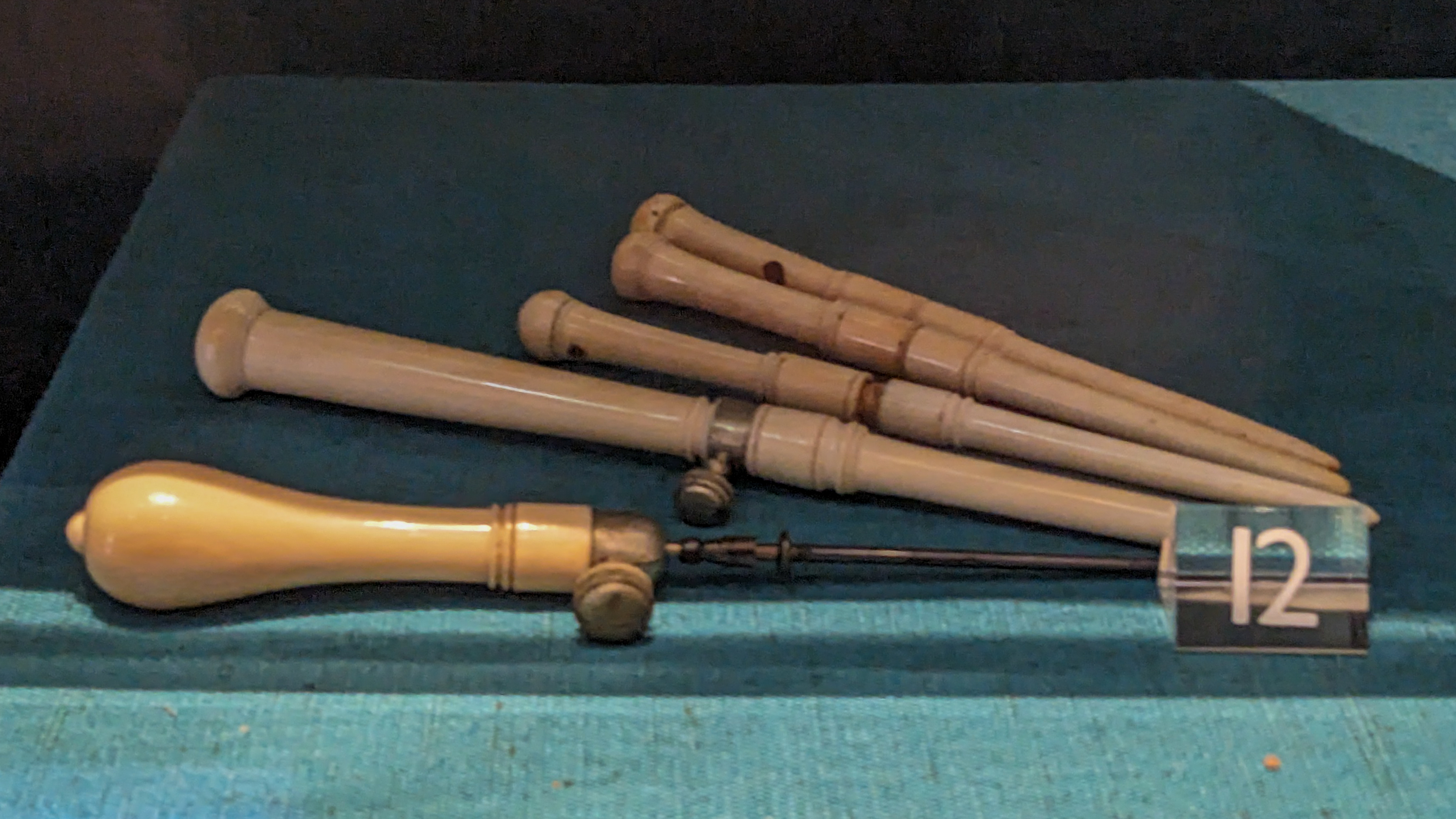
"Southey's cannulas" thought to have been owned by Southey himself, at St Bartholomew's Hospital Museum, London

Reginald Southey (15 September 1835 – 8 November 1899) was an English physician and inventor of Southey's cannula or tube, a type of trocar used for draining oedema of the limbs.

== Life ==
Southey was a nephew of Romantic poet Robert Southey, and the fifth son of medical doctor Henry Herbert Southey. A graduate of Christ Church, Oxford, he studied medicine at St Bartholomew's Hospital before travelling the world. He went on to serve as a member of the Lunacy Commission from 1883 until 1898. He was Gulstonian Lecturer in 1867.

He was a lifelong friend of Charles Lutwidge Dodgson ('Lewis Carroll'), and encouraged Dodgson to take up photography.

On 28 January 1864 Southey married Frances Marianne Thornton at Holy Trinity, Clapham, Surrey. She was the daughter of Reverend Charles Watson Thornton, prebend of Hereford.

He died on 8 November 1899 aged 64, and was buried at St Mary the Virgin, Sutton Valence, Kent.
