= Rivington (publishers) =

Defunct English publishing company

Rivington, or Rivington's, also called Rivington & Co., was a London-based publishing company founded by Charles Rivington (1688–1742), originally from Derbyshire, and continued by his sons and grandsons.

== History ==
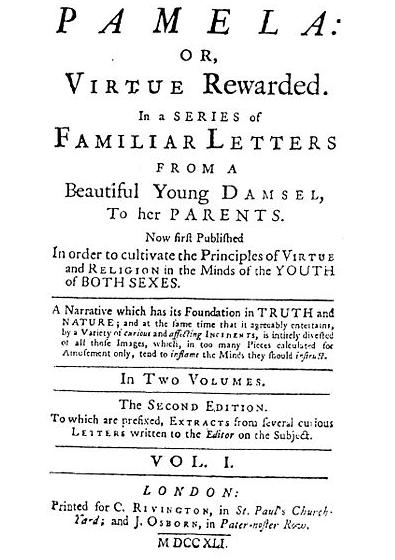
Samuel Richardson's Pamela, or Virtue Rewarded

In 1736 Charles Rivington and a partner called Bettesworth founded a company of booksellers called "The New Conger", rivalling an older firm called "The Conger" that dated from about 1700. From selling books, Rivington moved on to the business of publishing books. In 1741 he published the first volume of Samuel Richardson's novel Pamela, or Virtue Rewarded. Both men were from Derbyshire, and Rivington had persuaded Richardson to write a novel in the form of a correspondence.

After his death in 1742, Charles Rivington was succeeded by his two sons, John (1720–1792) and James Rivington (1724–1802). James emigrated to the United States, where he pursued his trade in New York City; John carried on the business on the lines marked out by his father and went on to become the great Church of England publisher of his day. In 1760, he was appointed publisher to the Society for Promoting Christian Knowledge, and the firm kept up this relationship for over seventy years. After admitting his sons Francis (1745–1822) and Charles (1754–1831) into partnership, Rivington took on for the "New Conger" Association the publication of standard editions of the works of Shakespeare, Milton, Locke, and other English classics. John Rivington died on 16 January 1792.

In 1797 Francis & Charles Rivington acquired the copyright of Hannah More's Cheap Repository Tracts in return for providing the Repository with half the profits from collected editions. The firm produced collected editions of the tracts in 1798, 1799, 1800 and at regular intervals thereafter. Following the death of Henry Thornton, the Treasurer of the Cheap Repository, Hannah More was upset when she discovered just how profitable these editions had been for the company.

In 1810, another John Rivington (1779–1841), the eldest son of Francis, was admitted a partner. In 1815 they published Robert Thorpe's A Letter to William Wilberforce, Esq. M. P., Vice-President of the African Institution". The new partnership also produced a collection of Hannah More's 'Spa Fields' tracts in 1819 entitled Cheap Repository Tracts, Suited to the Present Times.

In 1827 George (1801–1858) and Francis (1805–1885), sons of Charles Rivington, also joined the firm. Rivington made new links with the High Church party by the publication from 1833 of Tracts for the Times. John Rivington died on 21 November 1841, after his son, another John Rivington (1812–1886) had been admitted a partner in 1836. George Rivington died in 1858; and in 1859 Francis Rivington retired, leaving the conduct of affairs in the hands of John Rivington and his own sons, Francis Hansard (born 1834) and Septimus (born 1846).

Between 1829 and 1851 the firm published two series of the Cheap Repository Tracts with the imprints of J.G. & F. and J.G.F. & J. Rivington on behalf of the Society for Promoting Christian Knowledge. These were printed by R. Gilbert (latterly Gilbert & Rivington), as both individual tracts and in collected editions. Twenty-nine titles are listed on the Copac and WorldCat databases.

In 1887 Arthur John Butler joined the firm as a partner. In 1890 the business was sold to Longmans, and Butler then moved to Cassell & Company as chief editor. Despite this merger, a business similar to Rivington's was carried on from 1889 to 1893 by Septimus Rivington and John Guthrie Percival, under the name of Percival & Co. This name was changed in 1893 to Rivington, Percival & Co.; and in 1897 the new firm returned to the earlier title of Rivington & Co., maintaining its reputation for educational works and its connection with the Moderate Party and High Church Party.

== Book series ==
- Cheap Repository Tracts
- Theological Library
- Tracts for the Times

== Gallery ==
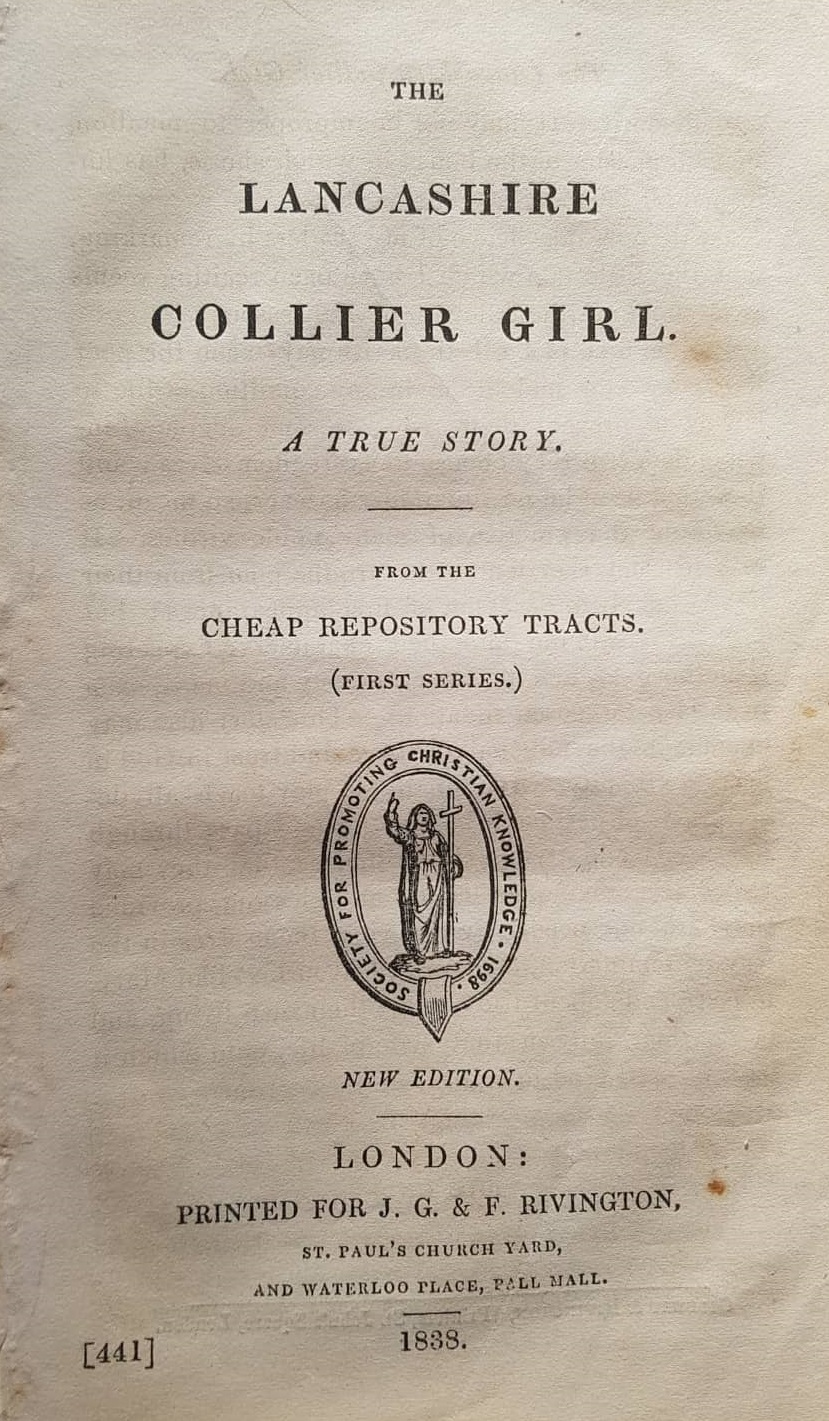
The Lancashire Collier Girl, 1838 edition

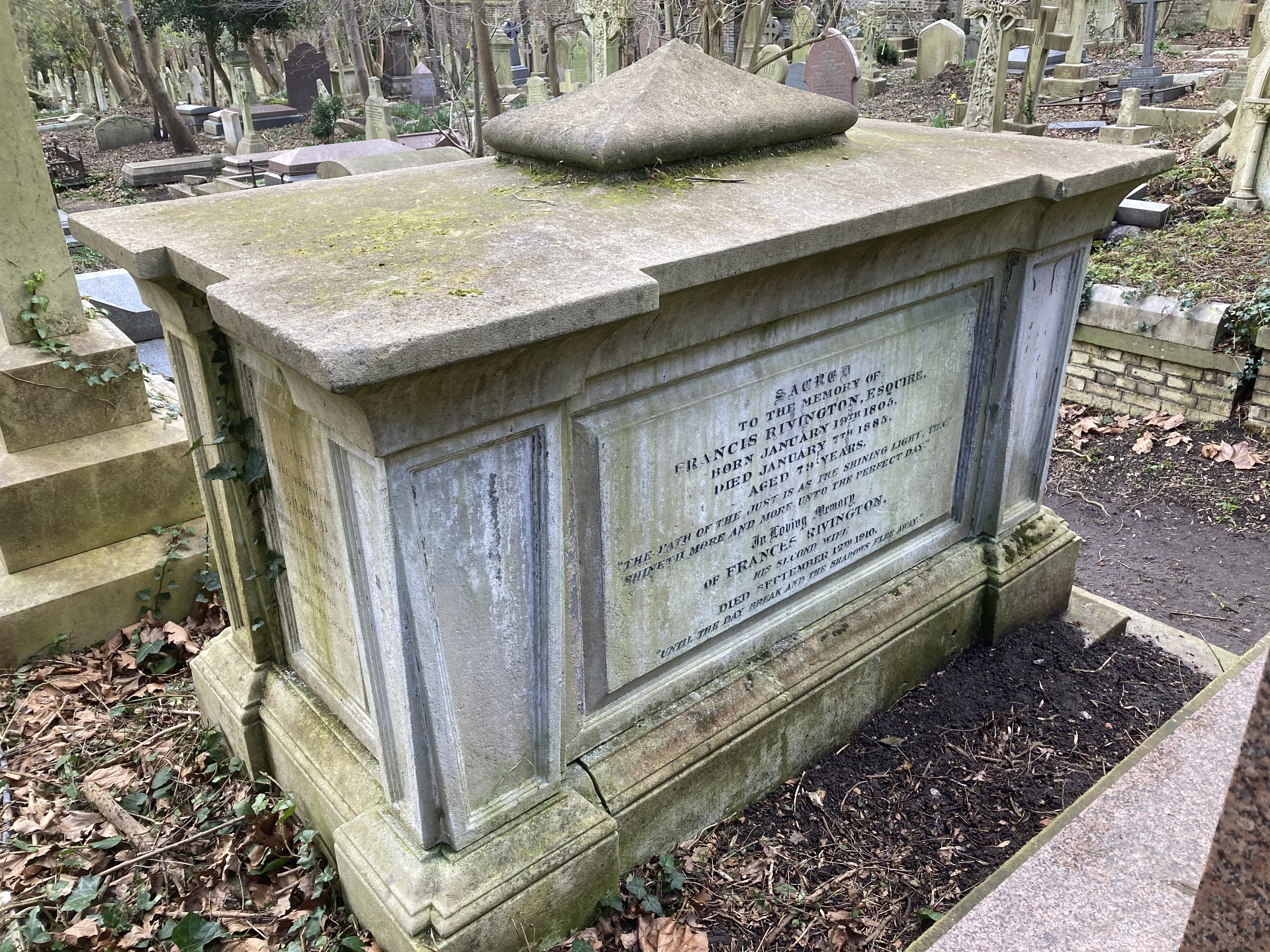
Family vault of Francis Rivington (1805 - 1885) in Highgate Cemetery (west side)
