= Richard Thomson (antiquarian) =

English librarian and antiquarian

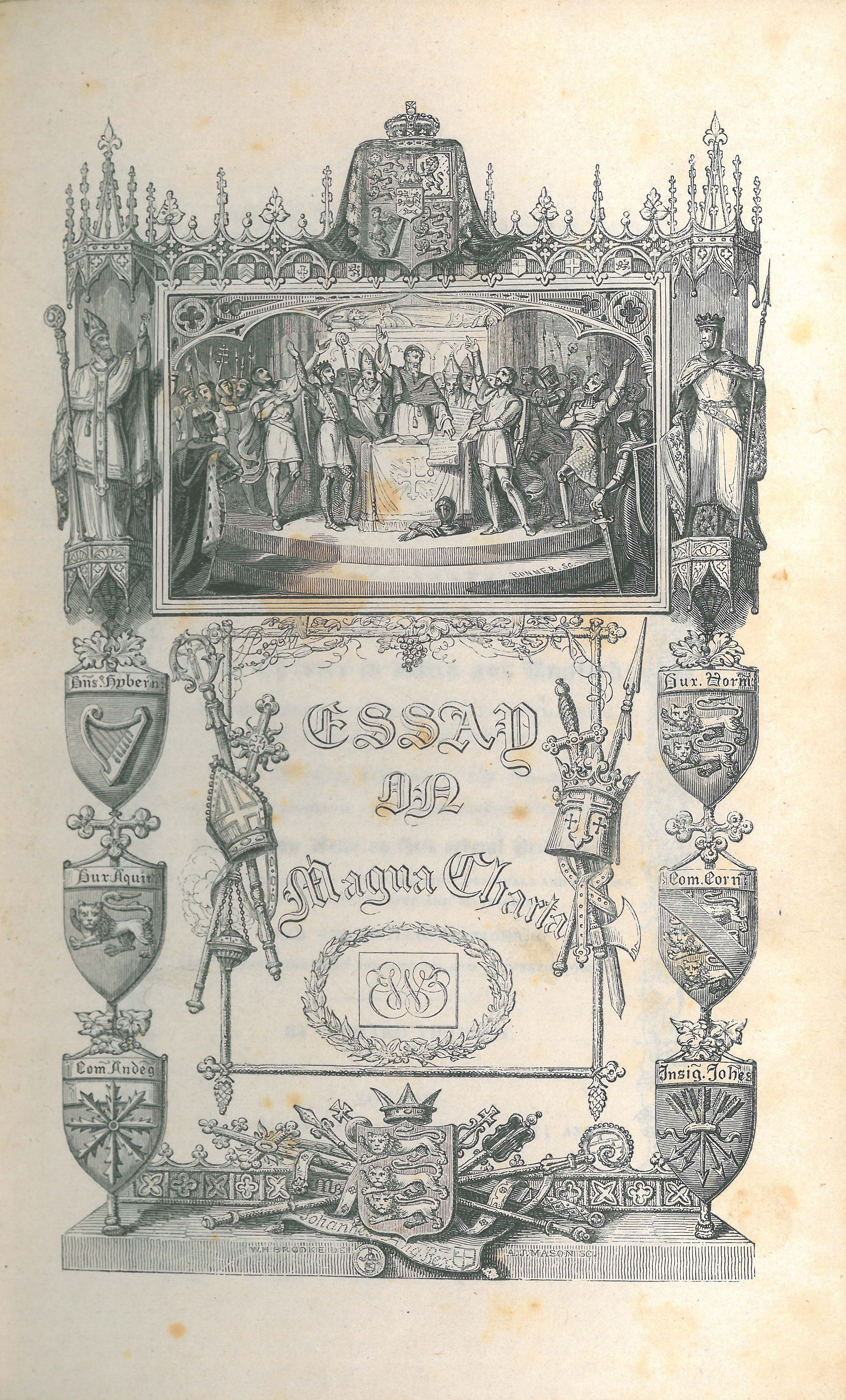
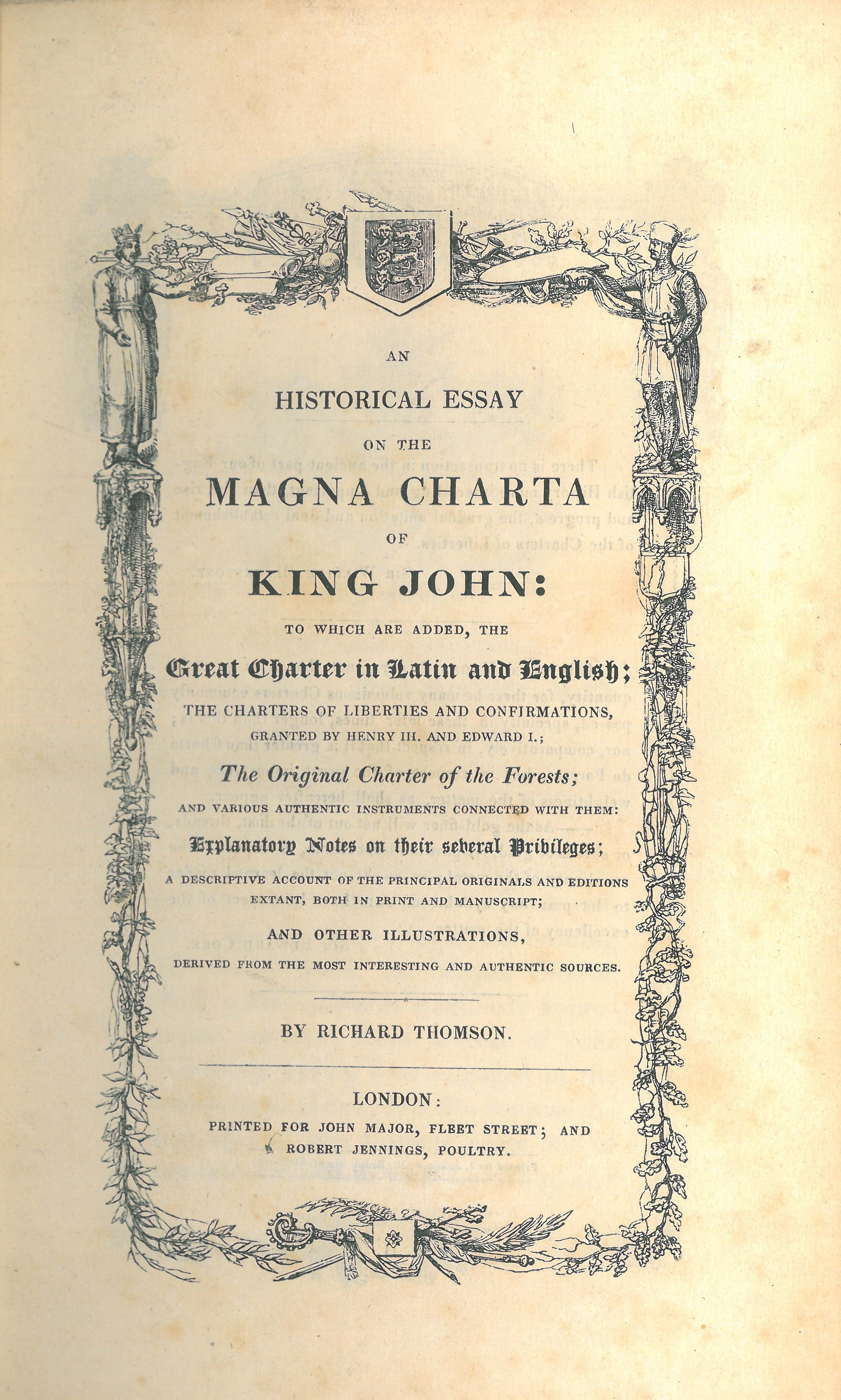
The engraved and ordinary title pages of Thomson's book An Historical Essay on the Magna Charta of King John (1829)

Richard Thomson (1794–1865) was an English librarian and antiquary.

== Life ==
Born at Fenchurch Street in London, England, Richard Thomson was the second son of a Scot who was a partner in the firm of seed merchants Gordon, Thomson, Keen & Co. For many years Thomson worked on the antiquities of London. Heraldry was one of his hobbies, and in his early life he assisted investigations of family history.

On 14 August 1834, Thomson and Edward William Brayley were elected joint-librarians of the London Institution in Finsbury Circus, in succession to William Maltby. Thomson held the post for the rest of his life.

Thomson died at his rooms in the Institution on 2 January 1865, aged 70. He was buried at Kensal Green cemetery, in the grave of a brother who had predeceased him.

== Legacy ==
A monument was erected to his memory. He was unmarried and died wealthy. During his lifetime he had given the Institution anonymously many works, and by his will he left it £500.

== Works ==
The catalogue of the London Institution library, issued in four volumes between 1835 and 1852, was compiled mostly by Thomson. He arranged, classified, and illustrated the antiquities found in the excavations for the new building of the Royal Exchange, London; they were then deposited in the museum of the London Corporation. Thomson contributed poems imitating major authors to A Garland for the New Royal Exchange (1845), edited by Sir William Tite.

Thomson's books were:

- Account of Processions and Ceremonies observed in the Coronation of the Kings and Queens of England, exemplified in that of George III and Queen Charlotte, 1820.
- The Book of Life: a Bibliographical Melody, 1820. Presented to the members of the Roxburghe Club.
- The Complete Angler. By Izaak Walton. Published by John Major, 1823, editor.
- Chronicles of London Bridge. By an Antiquary, 1827. 2nd ed. 1839.
- Illustrations of the History of Great Britain, 1828, 2 vols. Vols. 20 and 21 of Constable's Miscellany.
- Tales of an Antiquary [anon.], 1828, 3 vols.; new edit. 1832, 3 vols. Dedicated to "the author of Waverley". The legend of Killcrop the Changeling was reproduced in William Philip Nimmo's Popular Tales vol. ii.
- An Historical Essay on the Magna Charta of King John, 1829.
- Historical Notes for a Bibliographical Description of Mediæval illuminated Manuscripts of Hours, Offices [anon.], 1858.
- Lectures on Illuminated Manuscripts and the Materials and Practice of Illuminators, 1858.
- An Account of Cranmer's Catechism, a memorial book for the friends of William Tite and Richard Thomson, 1862.Courtney 1898, p. 267
