= John Williams (priest, born 1792) =

Welsh churchman, scholar and educator (1792–1858)

John Williams (1792 – 27 December 1858) was a Welsh churchman, scholar and educator, Archdeacon of Cardigan from 1833, first rector of Edinburgh Academy and warden of Llandovery College.

== Early life ==
He was the youngest child of Rev John Williams (1745–1818), vicar of Ystrad-meurig, and his wife Jane Rogers, daughter of Lewis Rogers of Gelli, high sheriff of Cardiganshire in 1753, was born at Ystrad-meurig on 11 April 1792. He was educated mainly at his father's celebrated school there, but after three years spent teaching at Chiswick he went for a short time to Ludlow School. He matriculated at Balliol College, Oxford on 30 November 1810, graduating B.A. in 1814, and M.A. in 1838.

== Schoolmaster ==
Williams was for four years (1814–18) assistant master to Henry Dison Gabell at Winchester College, and for another two years assistant to the brothers Charles and George Richards at Hyde Abbey School nearby. In 1820 Thomas Burgess, then bishop of St David's, offered him the vicarage of Lampeter, hoping that he would carry on the school established there by Eliezer Williams; he accepted, and Lampeter was selected as the home of the divinity school later known as St David's College, Lampeter. The foundation-stone was laid in 1822, but, having clashed with Burgess, Williams was not appointed its principal.

John Gibson Lockhart was a friend of Williams from Balliol, and Charles, the second son of Sir Walter Scott. He was followed by Villiers Surtees, and William Forbes Mackenzie. In 1824 Scott and Mackenzie's father invited Williams to become headmaster of the Edinburgh Academy that they were setting up. The school opened, with Williams as rector, on 1 October 1824. His pupils there included Archibald Campbell Tait, John Campbell Shairp, William Young Sellar, James Clerk Maxwell, William Edmondstoune Aytoun, Frederick William Robertson, Alexander Forbes, and Charles Frederick Mackenzie.

In August 1827 Williams accepted the post of Latin professor at London University. He resigned some nine months later, before taking up the duties, because of the opposition its secular policy had aroused among High churchmen. After a year's break in his connection with the Academy, he was re-elected rector in July 1829, and continued to hold the post until his retirement in July 1847. His relationship with Scott had prompted the writing of The Betrothed, a Welsh romance, and on Scott's death it was Williams who read the burial service over his remains at Dryburgh Abbey.

== Llandovery ==
Williams continued as non-resident vicar of Lampeter till October 1833, when he was instituted archdeacon of Cardigan; owing to some formality his institution had to be repeated in August 1835. A few weeks after his retirement from the rectorship Williams was appointed the first warden of the new school at Llandovery, just endowed by Thomas Phillips. The school was opened in temporary premises on 1 March 1848, pending the erection of permanent buildings, which were completed by May 1851, and Williams's name was used in fundraising. He hoped to develop the school into a collegiate institution which might perhaps in time supersede Lampeter College.

With Sir Benjamin Hall, Williams publicly attacked Lampeter College for its training and its neglect of Welsh studies. Ill-health, however, compelled Williams to end his scholastic career by retiring from the wardenship at Easter 1853, by which time Llandovery was making a reputation for itself.

== Last years ==
The rest of his life Williams mostly spent on his writing. He moved to Brighton in 1853, where he took for three months the duties of his old pupil, Frederick Robertson at Trinity Chapel. He subsequently lived for a time at Oxford, but in 1857 went to reside at Bushey, Hertfordshire, where he died on 27 December 1858. Williams was buried on 4 January 1859 in Bushey churchyard.

== Works ==
Williams studied the early history of the Celts, Welsh language and literature. His published works include:

- ‘Two Essays on the Geography of Ancient Asia: intended partly to illustrate the Campaigns of Alexander the Great and the Anabasis of Xenophon,’ London, 1829.
- ‘The Life and Actions of Alexander the Great’, vol. ii. of Murray's Family Library, London, 1829; New York; 3rd edit. London, 1860. These two works were written during the author's rectorial interregnum in 1828–9.
- 'Homerus,' London, 1842. The essential unity of the Homeric poems was upheld by Williams.
- 'Claudia and Pudens. An Attempt to show that Claudia was a British Princess,' and that Britain was Christianised in the first century, Llandovery, 1848. Claudia is mentioned in 2 Timothy iv. 21.
- 'The Life of Julius Cæsar,' London, 1854.
- 'Gomer; or a Brief Analysis of the Language and Knowledge of the Ancient Cymry' (London, 1854), followed in the same year by a "second part", which contained "specimens from the works of the oldest Cymric poets in their original form, with translations". Williams dealt with the origin of language. He claiming also that Welsh in its earliest known forms was expressive of philosophical truths such as the "doctrine of the conditioned"; Sir William Hamilton, 9th Baronet approved.
- 'Discourses and Essays on the Unity of God's Will ... with special reference to God's Dealings with the people of Christianised Britain,' London, 1857.
- 'Essays on various Subjects, Philological, Philosophical, Ethnological, and Archæological,' London, 1858.
- 'Letters on the Inexpediency, Folly, and Sin of a "Barbarian Episcopate" in a Christian Principality,' London, 1858.

He also brought out in 1851 an edition of Theophilus Evans's 'Drych y Prif Oesoedd' (Carmarthen).

Williams read papers to the Royal Society of Edinburgh, of which he was a fellow. He also contributed essays to the Cambrian Journal for 1855–7, and articles to the Quarterly Review and other magazines. At his death, he left unfinished works. Most of his papers and correspondence were lost off the coast of Spain in the wreck of the SS Europa (17 July 1878).

== Family ==
While at Lampeter William married Mary, only daughter of Thomas Evans of Llanilar, Cardiganshire, who predeceased him on 16 August 1854. He had six daughters with Mary, five of whom survived him. The eldest, Jane Eliza, in 1861 married Major Walter Colquhoun-Grant of the 2nd dragoon guards, who died the same year in India. She occupied for many years the position of lady principal of Kidderpore House, Calcutta (where she died on 24 September 1895), being succeeded in the principalship by her fourth sister, Margaret, who died unmarried at the same institution on 12 July 1896. Williams's third daughter, Lætitia (died 20 March 1899), married Robert Cunliffe, president of the Incorporated Law Society for 1890–1; and the youngest, Lucy, married John Cave Orr of Calcutta.

== Notes ==
Attribution

This article incorporates text from a publication now in the public domain: Lee, Sidney, ed. (1900). "Williams, John (1792-1858)". Dictionary of National Biography. Vol. 61. London: Smith, Elder & Co.
