= The American School Library =

Set of books produced in 1838-1839

The American School Library was a set of books published by Harper & Brothers in 1838 and 1839 on behalf of the American Society for the Diffusion of Useful Knowledge. The society was incorporated in the state of New York on May 16, 1837, at the urging of the Reverend Gorham D. Abbott. The American Society, and its Library, were inspired by "A Library of Useful Knowledge", a set of educational pamphlets published in England in the late 1820s by the UK's Society for the Diffusion of Useful Knowledge. The fifty books in the set included volumes on American, Egyptian and Chinese history, biographies of George Washington and Napoleon Bonaparte, the principles of physiology and health, and the novel The Swiss Family Robinson. The set of 50 books was priced twenty dollars, with the cost of providing a set to the nation's fifty thousand school districts set at one million dollars.

In 1839, New York State passed a law mandating that every school district in the state would buy a set of American School Library volumes. However, while the superintendent of schools agreed to purchase the books from the publisher, he did not acknowledge the society's role in its distribution, and no remuneration was offered directly to the society. The society, which had spent more than $10,000 and raised only $3,000, was looking forward to the New York purchases to cover its debts. Left with no resources, the society suspended operations.

The Smithsonian Institution's National Museum of American History holds the only complete original set of this series, complete with its wooden carrying case. The exhibit is titled, "The School District Library by Harper & Brothers."

== Goals ==
The society's aim was to create a national school library, to be placed in the nation's fifty thousand schools. "For this purpose," the Connecticut Common School Journal printed, "the Society proposed, from the outset, the publication of a series of popular works, upon all those branches of knowledge, most interesting and useful to the great body of the people;— including History, Voyages and Travels, Biography, Natural History, the Physical, Intellectual, Moral and Political Sciences, Agriculture, Manufactures, Arts, Commerce, Belles Lettres, the History and Philosophy of Education, and the Evidences of Christianity. It aims thus to bring before the minds of the entire population of the country, the richest means of social, intellectual, and moral improvement; and in the view of the Committee, there are few ways in which more extensive, substantial and lasting good can be conferred upon our country."

== Contributors ==
Contributors to the library included John Abercrombie, Sir John Barrow, Andrew Combe, Andrew Crichton, John Francis Davis, Thomas Dick, William Dunlap, Leonhard Euler, Francis L. Hawks (as "Uncle Philip"), William Mullinger Higgins, Barbara Hofland, Mary Hughs, George Payne Rainsford James, Anna Jameson, Robert Jameson, John Gibson Lockhart, Hugh Murray, James Montgomery, James Kirke Paulding, Eliza Robbins, Michael Russell, Catharine Maria Sedgwick, Benjamin Bussey Thatcher, John Williams, James Wilson and Johann David Wyss.

== Contents ==
The fifty library volumes included:

=== History ===
- A View of Ancient and Modern Egypt by Rev. M. Russell, LL.D.
- Palestine, or the Holy Land: From the Earliest Period to the Present Time by Rev. M. Russell, LL.D.
- History of Chivalry and the Crusades by G.P.R. James
- The History of Arabia, Ancient and Modern by Andrew Crichton (2 vols)
- The Chinese: A general Description of the Empire of China and its Inhabitants by John Francis Davis, F.R.S.
- American History: By the Author of American Popular Lessons (3 vols)
- American Revolution by B.B. Thatcher, Esq.
- History of New York by William Dunlap
- History of Virginia by "Uncle Philip"

=== Voyages and Travels ===
- An Historical Account of the Circumnavigation of the Globe
- Narrative of Discovery and Adventure in Africa: From the Earliest Ages to the Present Time by Professor Jameson, and James Wilson and Hugh Murray, Esqrs.
- Lives and Voyages of Early Navigators

=== Biography ===
- A Life of Washington by J.K. Paulding, Esq. (2 vols)
- The Life of Napoleon Bonaparte by J.G. Lockhart, Esq. (2 vols)
- The Life and Actions of Alexander the Great by the Rev. J. Williams
- Memoir of the Life of Peter the Great by Sir John Barrow
- The Life of Oliver Cromwell by the Rev. M. Russell, LL.D.
- Lives of Celebrated Travellers by James Augustus St. John

=== Natural history ===
- A Popular Guide to the Observation of Nature; or, Hints of Inducement to the Study of Natural Productions and Appearances, in their Connexions and Relations by Robert Mudie
- The Swiss Family Robinson; or, Adventures of a Father and Mother and Four Sons on a Desert Island (2 vols)
- The American Forest; or, Uncle Philip's Conversations with the Children about the Trees of America
- The Natural History of Insects (2 vols)
- Natural History; or, Tools and Trades among Inferior Animals by "Uncle Philip"

=== Physical Science ===
- The Principles of Physiology, applied to the Preservation of Health, and to the Improvement of Physical and Mental Education by Andrew Combe, M.D.
- Letters of Euler on Different Subjects of Natural Philosophy: Addressed to a German Princess translated by Hunter, with Notes, and a Life of Euler, by Sir David Brewster; and Additional Notes, by John Griscom, LL.D.

=== Intellectal Science ===
- Inquiries concerning the Intellectual Powers, and the Investigation of Truth by John Abercrombie, M.D., F.R.S.

=== Belles Lettres ===
- Lectures on General Literature, Poetry, &c. by Jas. Montgomery

=== Miscellaneous ===
- Indian Traits; being Sketches of the Manners, Customs, and Character of the North American Natives by B.B. Thatcher, Esq. (2 vols)
- Perils of the Sea; being Authentic Narratives of Remarkable and Affecting Disasters upon the Deep
- The Poor Rich Man and the Rich Poor Man by Miss C.M. Sedgwick
- The Ornaments Discovered by Mary Hughs
- The Son of a Genius by Mrs. Hofland
- The Whale-fishery and the Polar Seas by "Uncle Philip"
