= William Johnson Neale =

English barrister and novelist

William Johnson Neale (1812–1893), whose full name was William Johnstoun Nelson Neale, was an English barrister and novelist.

== Life ==
He was the second son of Adam Neale, and brother of Erskine Neale. In 1824 he entered the Royal Navy, and for his services on board HMS Talbot at the battle of Navarino in 1827 was awarded a medal.

On 17 Jan. 1833 Neale became a student of Lincoln's Inn, but subsequently migrated to the Middle Temple, where he was called to the bar on 25 November 1836. He went the Oxford circuit, and practised also at Shropshire and Staffordshire sessions. In 1859 he was appointed recorder of Walsall.

Neale died at Cheltenham on 27 March 1893.

== Works ==
Neale wrote popular sea stories:

- Cavendish, or the Patrician at Sea [anon.], 3 vols., London, 1831 (reprinted in 1854, 1860 as vol. ccxix. of the "Parlour Library", and 1861 as vol. v. of the "Naval and Military Library").
- The Port Admiral, a Tale of the War [anon.], 3 vols., London, 1833 (also included in vol. iv. of the "Naval and Military Library", 1861).
- Will-Watch: from the Autobiography of a British Officer, 3 vols., London, 1834.
- The Priors of Prague, 3 vols., London, 1836.
- Gentleman Jack, a Naval Story, 3 vols., London, 1837.
- The Flying Dutchman: a Legend of the High Seas, 3 vols., London, 1839.
- The Naval Surgeon, 3 vols., London, 1841 (reprinted in 1858, and again in 1861, in vol. vi. of the "Naval and Military Library").
- Paul Periwinkle, or the Pressgang, London, 1841, with forty etchings by "Phiz".
- The Captain's Wife, 3 vols., London, 1842 (another edit, 1862).
- The Lost Ship, or the Atlantic Steamer, 3 vols., London, 1843 (another edit. 1860).
- Scapegrace at Sea; or, Soldiers afloat and Sailors ashore, 2nd edit. 3 vols., London, 1863.
- History of the Mutiny at Spithead and the Nore (anon.), London, 1842.

Neale wrote also The Lauread, a ... Satire ... Book the first (anon.), London, 1833 (two editions), and, with Basil Montagu, a handbook on the Law of Parliamentary Elections, 2 pts. 12mo, London, 1839–40.

== Family ==
Neale married, on 12 December 1846, Frances Herbert, daughter of Captain Josiah Nisbet, R.N., and eldest grandchild of Viscountess Nelson.

== Notes ==
Attribution

This article incorporates text from a publication now in the public domain: Lee, Sidney, ed. (1894). "Neale, William Johnson". Dictionary of National Biography. Vol. 40. London: Smith, Elder & Co.
