= Edward Smedley =

English clergyman and miscellaneous writer

Edward Smedley (1788–1836) was an English clergyman known as a miscellaneous writer.

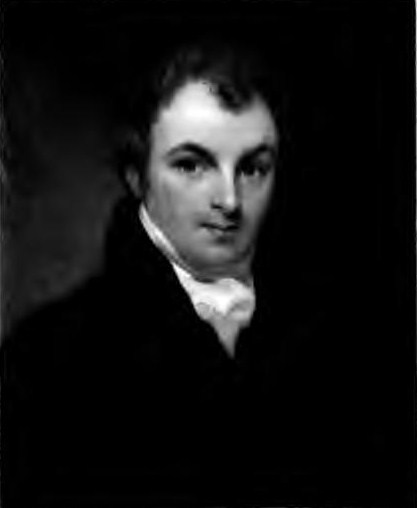
Edward Smedley

== Life ==
The second son of the Rev. Edward Smedley by his wife Hannah, fourth daughter of George Bellas of Willey, Surrey, was born in the Sanctuary, Westminster, on 12 September 1788. His father held the post of usher of Westminster School from 1774 to 1820, and was a reader of the Rolls Chapel. In 1816 he was made rector of North Bovey and of Powderham in Devon. He died on 8 August 1825.

Edward was sent to Westminster School as a home boarder in 1795, before he had completed his seventh year. He became a king's scholar in 1800, and was elected head to Trinity College, Cambridge, in 1805. He obtained the wooden spoon in 1809, graduating B.A. in the same year, and M.A. in 1812. As a middle bachelor he gained one of the members' prizes for Latin prose in 1810, and in the following year he gained a similar distinction as a senior bachelor. He was elected to a fellowship of Sidney Sussex College in 1812, and won the Seatonian prize for English verse in 1813, 1814, 1827, and 1828.

Smedley was ordained deacon in September 1811, and took priest's orders in the following year. Through his father's old friend, Gerrard Andrewes, Smedley became preacher at St James's Chapel, Tottenham Court Road, and in July 1815 was appointed clerk in orders of St. James's parish, Westminster. Smedley vacated his fellowship on his marriage, on 8 January 1816. Shortly afterwards he became evening lecturer at St Giles's, Camberwell, a post which he held for a few years only. In 1819 he resigned his appointment of clerk in orders of St. James's parish, and took to teaching in addition to his literary and clerical work.

In 1822 he accepted the editorship of the Encyclopædia Metropolitana. He began his duties with the seventh part, and continued to hold the post of editor until his death. Owing to his increasing deafness, he was compelled in 1827 to give up taking pupils, and in the following year he became totally deaf.

In 1829 he was collated by the bishop of Lincoln to the prebend of Sleaford, and in 1831 he resigned his preachership at St James's Chapel. In spite of poor health he continued to write until within a few months of his death. He died, after a lingering illness, on 29 June 1836, aged 47, and was buried at Dulwich. By his wife Mary, youngest daughter of James Hume of Wandsworth Common, Surrey, secretary of the customs, he had several children.

== Works ==
Smedley was a frequent contributor to the British Critic and to the Penny Cyclopædia as well as to the Encyclopædia Metropolitana. His Poems … with a Selection from his Correspondence and a Memoir of his Life, London, were published by his widow in 1837. The Tribute: a Collection of Miscellaneous unpublished Poems by various Authors, London, 1837, was edited by the Marquess of Northampton for the benefit of Smedley's family.

Smedley also wrote:

- A Few Verses, English and Latin, 1812, anon.
- The Death of Saul and Jonathan, a Poem, Seatonian Prize, London, 1814; 2nd ed. London, 1814.
- Jephthah, a Poem, Seatonian Prize, London, 1814.
- Jonah: a Poem, London, 1815.
- Prescience, or the Secrets of Divination: a Poem in two parts, London, 1816.
- Religio Clerici: a Churchman's Epistle, verse, London, 1818, anon.
- A Churchman's second Epistle, verse, London, 1819, anon.
- The Parson's Choice of Town or Country: an Epistle to a Young Divine, verse, London, 1821.

These last three poems were republished under the title of Religio Clerici: two Epistles by a Churchman, with Notes; a new edition, London, 1821.

- Fables of my Garden. These were written by Smedley in verse for his children, and were privately printed.
- Lux Renata: a Protestant's Epistle, with Notes, London, 1827, anon.
- The Marriage in Cana: a Poem, Seatonian Prize London, 1828.
- Saul at Endor: a Dramatic Sketch, Seatonian Prize poem, London, 1829.
- A very short Letter from one old Westminster to another, touching some Matters connected with their School, London, 1829, anon.
- Sketches from Venetian History, London, 1831–2; 2 vols. anon. These formed vols. xx. and xxxii. of Murray's Family Library, and were reprinted in Harper's Family Library, New York, 1844, 2 vols.
- History of the Reformed Religion in France, London, 1832–4, 3 vols. These formed vols. iii. vi. and viii. of Rivington's Theological Library, and were reprinted in New York, 1834, 3 vols.
- History of France: Part I., from the Final Partition of the Empire of Charlemagne, A.D. 843, to the Peace of Cambray, A.D. 1529, London, 1836. This formed vol. x. of the Library of Useful Knowledge.

== Notes ==
Attribution

This article incorporates text from a publication now in the public domain: "Smedley, Edward". Dictionary of National Biography. London: Smith, Elder & Co. 1885–1900.
