= Francis L. Hawks =

American writer, historian, educator and priest (1798–1866)

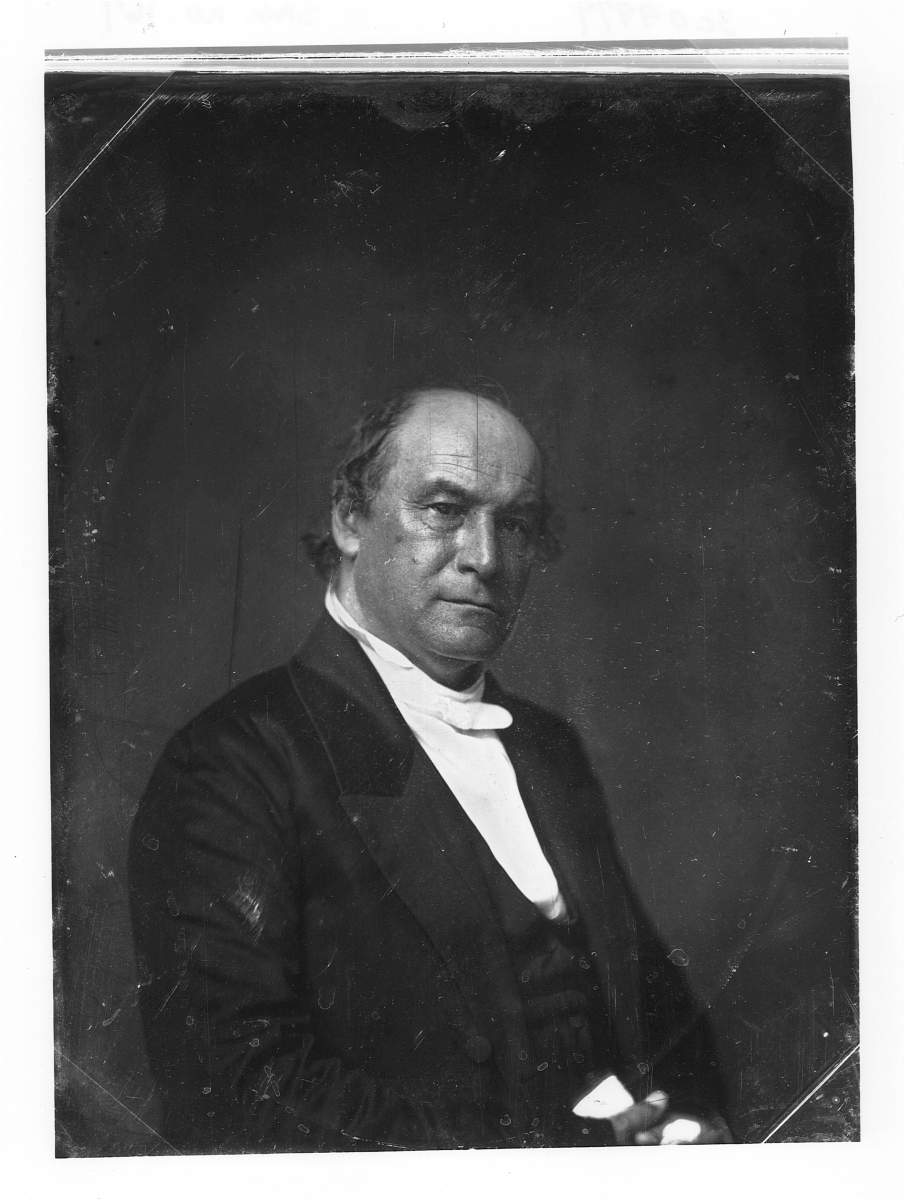
- Born: Francis Lister Hawks; June 10, 1798; New Bern, North Carolina
- Died: September 26, 1866 (aged 68); New York, New York
- Education: North Carolina University

Francis Lister Hawks (June 10, 1798 – September 26, 1866) was an American writer, historian, educator and priest of the Episcopal Church. After practicing law with some distinction (and a brief stint as politician in North Carolina), Hawks became an Episcopal priest in 1827 and proved a brilliant and impressive preacher, holding livings (a church benefice including revenues) in New Haven, Philadelphia, New York City and New Orleans, and declining several bishoprics. However, scandals during the 1830s and 40s led him to posts on the American frontier and rejection of his selection as bishop of Mississippi, Hawks was the first president of the University of Louisiana (now known as Tulane University) Hawks then moved to Baltimore, Maryland, and eventually returned to New York City.

Hawks's major contributions now seem literary. He edited the single volume Appletons' Cyclopaedia of Biography (1856), which added American biographies to the volume edited by Elihu Rich and published in 1854 by Richard Griffin & Company (London). Hawks' church history works remain important today. After being named the Episcopal Church's historiographer in 1835, Hawks traveled to England and collected materials afterwards utilized in his Contributions to the Ecclesiastical History of U.S.A. (New York, 1836–1839). The first two volumes dealt with Maryland and Virginia, while two later ones (1863, 1864) were devoted to Connecticut.

== Early life and career ==
Hawks was born in New Bern, North Carolina. He graduated from the state university, now known as the University of North Carolina at Chapel Hill, in 1815, where he was a member of the Philanthropic Society. He then entered the practice of law. He represented New Bern in the North Carolina House of Commons in 1821. Hawks also became active in the Episcopal Church, where he took the post of lay reader of his parish. Hawks felt drawn to the ministry and entered the tutelage of Bishop John Stark Ravenscroft.

Hawks quickly climbed the church ranks, becoming deacon in 1827 and assistant minister of Trinity parish in New Haven, Connecticut, a short while later. His preaching was widely praised, and in short order, he was ordained a priest. His next post was as assistant to Bishop White of St. James' Church in Philadelphia. He next took a position as Professor of Divinity at Washington College (now Trinity College) in Hartford, Connecticut.

== Rectorships ==
In 1831, Hawks took his first church appointment, as rector of St. Stephen's Church on the corner of Broome and Chrystie streets in New York City. There his sermons attracted a large congregation. On 4 October, a mere nine months since he had moved to St. Stephens', the congregation of nearby St. Thomas Church called upon him to take over as their rector. The position offered $1,500 in annual salary with an additional $500 for other expenses. Hawks turned the offer down. St. Thomas did not give up, and Hawks eventually accepted their offer on 17 December, becoming the third rector for St. Thomas Church.

Hawks's new church experienced a boom in membership after his arrival. Much of the congregation of St. Stephen's followed him to the new post, and many more congregants began attending as Hawks's fame for oratory spread. Eventually, the church had to be expanded with a gallery to contain the overflow. Hawks's Bible classes had an average attendance of 100 students. Philip Hone, ex-mayor of New York City, spoke for many when he wrote, "I went yesterday morning to St. Thomas' where I heard from Dr. Hawks a glorious sermon." Praise came from other clergymen, as well. Bishop Thomas March Clark of Rhode Island wrote:

To hear him preach was like listening to the harmonies of a grand organ with its various stops and solemn sub-bass and tremulous pathetic reeds. The rector of one of the Washington churches, where Daniel Webster was an attendant, told me that after Dr. Hawks had preached for him on a Sunday morning, Mr. Webster said that it was the greatest sermon he had ever heard.

In 1833, Hawks's salary rose to $3000 with an additional $500 allowed for other expenditures; this made him the highest paid clergyman in the United States. He also received an assistant rector for St. Thomas. He was elected bishop of the Southwestern region in 1835, but he declined the post, citing a lack of support for his family in what was then the American frontier.

== Additional church work ==
Hawks continued to participate in other church affairs, as well. In 1832, he was appointed assistant secretary to the House of Deputies of the General Convention of the Episcopal Church. In 1833, he took a part-time post as Professor of Ecclesiastical History and Pulpit Eloquence at the General Theological Seminary. The following year, Hawks was named secretary of the New York diocesan convention in New York City.

Church history was another of Hawks's interests, and his writings are an important source on the early American church. In 1835, the General Convention named Hawks "Conservator of all books, pamphlets and manuscripts of this church."

Hawks's interest in history led him to London in 1835. There he copied important historical documents, which he used as material for a two-volume work on the church history of Maryland and Virginia. He also wrote some nine titles under the pen name "Uncle Philip" for the publishers Harper & Brothers, which appeared in their Harper's Boy's and Girl's Library imprint series.

While in London Hawks met the American traveller John Lloyd Stephens, later to be renowned for his exploratory work and investigations of a number of mostly-unknown ancient ruins of the pre-Columbian Maya civilization in Central America. Stephens had just completed a nine-month tour of Egypt and the Levant, and several letters describing his travels had been published in an American periodical. His acquaintance with Hawks encouraged Stephens to write a book on his Middle Eastern adventures, which was a popular success. Sixteen years later, Hawks wrote Stephens' obituary, as the adventurer died at age 47 from a liver illness, the article appeared in the first issue of Putnam's Monthly Magazine. He noted how "[i]n repeated conversations with the present writer, the attention of Mr. Stephens was [first] called to the ruins of Guatemala and Yucatan"; the two books Stephens had later written on his explorations of that region are regarded as foundational works in the then-young science of American archaeology.

Hawks continued to write and publish on general church affairs.In 1837, he partnered with fellow priest Caleb S. Henry to put out a magazine called the New York Review. The publication, a response to the Unitarian North American Review, published until 1842. He helped start The Church Record, a journal of Christian education, in 1843, and in 1853 The Church Journal. In 1851, Hawks had accepted the post of Historiographer of the Protestant Episcopal Church, and held it until his death.

== Scandal and later life ==
In late 1838, Hawks became one of many targets of a trend among the American penny press to expose alleged vices of holy men. The accuser was George Washington Dixon, a man known for his blackface music act, who claimed that Hawks was engaging in sexual affairs. Hawks charged Dixon with libel on 31 December 1838. After a heated trial, Dixon pled guilty on 10 and 11 May 1839. The reasons for this remain a mystery, though Dale Cockrell surmised that Hawks did not want to face further defamation of character in trial and may have paid Dixon off. Dixon claimed so in 1841. The New York Herald wrote that "[he] may explain and explain till doomsday—but these facts and their inferences [will] adhere."

Another scandal erupted closer to home. Hawks had opened a boys' school known as St. Thomas' Hall in 1839 in Flushing, Queens. The school had financial difficulties and was failing within three years, and Hawks was accused of mismanaging the funds. This proved one scandal too many. Hawks resigned from St. Thomas Church on 21 October 1843.

During the period 1838–1839, he published four titles under the pseudonym Lambert Lily.

Over the next decade, Hawks bounced from church to church. He first moved to a church in Holly Springs, Mississippi, on the American frontier and far from the disgrace of New York. There he went to work starting another school. At the Mississippi Diocesan Convention of 1844, Hawks took center stage due primarily to his endeavors to create a Diocesan school. When the Convention called for the election of the Diocese's first bishop, Hawks was tapped. His episcopal confirmation at the General Convention was protested, with James Quarterman, a painter from Flushing, alleging that Hawks had over $100,000 in outstanding debt due to financial mismanagement at St. Thomas. Though Hawks successfully defended himself and the General Convention expressed their support for him, they discharged his consent back to the Diocese of Mississippi. In the end, Hawks turned the post down. He instead moved to Christ Church in New Orleans, Louisiana.

In 1847, he was named the first president of the University of Louisiana, known today as Tulane University. Then in 1849, he returned to New York City to pastor Calvary Church. He stayed there until 1862. Hawks declined most non-clerical appointments during his time at Calvary, including an election to the Rhode Island episcopate in 1852 and a professorship at the University of North Carolina at Chapel Hill in 1859. He continued to write, and in 1855 and 1856 he co-authored the Narrative of the Expedition of an American Squadron to the China Seas and Japan with Commodore Matthew Perry. During the American Civil War, Hawks moved to Christ Church in Baltimore, Maryland. By 1861 he was editing again, this time with William Stevens Perry on the Journal of the General Conventions. He began as editor of Documentary History of the Protestant Episcopal Church in 1863 and held the post until 1864. He later gave the endowment for St. Mark's Church-in-the-Bowery Chair of Ecclesiastical History at the General Seminary. He returned once more to New York City in 1865, where he helped to start the Chapel of the Holy Saviour on 25th Street. Another project was a Spanish-speaking church called Iglesia de Santiago, where Hawks preached on occasion. Hawks died on 26 September 1866. After a funeral at Calvary Church, he was buried at Christ Church in Greenwich, Connecticut.

== Selected works ==
- Uncle Philip's Conversations
- 1842 – The Adventures of Henry Hudson
- 1853 – Peruvian Antiquities, translated from the Spanish of Mariano Edward Rivero and John James von Tschudi. New York: George P. Putnam.
- 1856 – Narrative of the Expedition of an American Squadron to the China Seas and Japan Performed in the Years 1852, 1853 and 1854 under the Command of Commodore M. C. Perry, United States Navy. Washington: A. O. P. Nicholson by order of Congress; originally published in Senate Executive Documents, No. 34 of 33rd Congress, 2nd Session. Reprinted London: Trafalgar Square, 2005. ISBN 978-1-84588-026-2 (paper)
- 1856 – Appletons' Cyclopaedia of Biography

== Notes ==
Academic offices
Preceded by first	President of Tulane University; 1847–1849	Succeeded by Theodore Howard McCaleb
