= Michael Russell (bishop of Glasgow and Galloway) =

Scottish bishop

The Right Reverend Michael Russell
- Bishop of Glasgow and Galloway
- Church: Scottish Episcopal Church
- Diocese: Glasgow and Galloway
- In office: 1837-1848
- Successor: Walter Trower

Orders
- Ordination: 1808 by George Gleig
- Consecration: 8 October 1837 by James Walker

Personal details
- Born: 12 August 1781 Edinburgh, Scotland
- Died: 2 April 1848 (aged 66) Edinburgh, Scotland
- Buried: Restalrig Churchyard
- Denomination: Anglican
- Parents: John Russell, Euphan Hamilton
- Children: 1
- Education: University of Glasgow

Michael Russell (12 August 1781 – 2 April 1848) was the first Bishop of Glasgow and Galloway from 1837 to his death in 1848.

== Life ==
He was the eldest son of John Russell of Edinburgh. Matriculating at the University of Glasgow November 1800, he graduated M.A. in 1806. He was then appointed second master of Stirling grammar school, but, having become a convert to the Scottish Episcopal Church, he resigned the post and opened a school of his own.

In 1808 Russell was admitted into deacon's orders, and ordained to the charge of a small congregation in Alloa; he continued with his school until his appointment in the autumn of the following year to the charge of St. James's Chapel, Leith. In 1831 he was made dean of the diocese of Edinburgh, and on 8 October 1837 he was ordained bishop of Glasgow and Galloway, on the separation of the diocese from Edinburgh and St. Andrews. The religious opinions of Russell were liberal enough to cause his orthodoxy to be questioned.

Russell was active on behalf of the bill passed in 1840 removing religious disabilities from Scottish episcopalians. In 1820 he received the degree of LL.D. from the University of Glasgow, and in 1842 the University of Oxford conferred on him the diploma degree of D.C.L., for which he was admitted a member of St John's College.

He lived at 5 Summerfield in western Leith.

Russell died at Summerfield of a heart attack on 2 April 1848, and was buried in Restalrig churchyard on 11 April. A marble slab was also erected to his memory in St. James's episcopal chapel, Leith.

== Works ==
Russell was a prolific author. He was a contributor to the Encyclopædia Metropolitana and the British Critic, and he was for some time editor of the Scottish Episcopal Review and Magazine. To the Edinburgh Cabinet Library he contributed volumes on Palestine, 1831, Ancient and Modern Egypt, 1831, Nubia and Abyssinia, 1833, The Barbary States, 1835, Polynesia, 1842, and Iceland, Greenland, and the Faroe Isles, 1850. For Constable's Miscellany he wrote a life of Oliver Cromwell (1829, 2 vols.).

Besides sermons and charges, Russell was also the author of:

- A View of Education in Scotland, 1813;
- Connection of Sacred and Profane History from the Death of Joshua to the Decline of the Kingdoms of Israel and Judah, 3 vols. 1827, intended to complete the works of Samuel Shuckford and Humphrey Prideaux;
- Observations on the Advantages of Classical Learning, 1830;
- Discourses On The Millennium, The Doctrine Of Election, Justification By Faith, And On The Historical Evidence For The Apostolical Institution Of episcopacy; together with some Preliminary Remarks on the Principles Of Scriptural Interpretation, Rev. Michael Russell, LL.D., Oliver and Boyd, Edinburgh, 1830, and
- a History of the Church of Scotland in Rivington's Theological Library, 1834.

He published an edition of Robert Keith's Scottish Bishops (1824), and edited Archbishop John Spotiswood's History of the Church of Scotland for the Bannatyne Club and the Spottiswoode Society jointly (1847 and 1851).

Anglican Communion titles
Preceded by Inaugural appointment	Bishop of Glasgow and Galloway; 1837– 1848	Succeeded by Walter John Trower
