= Thomas Dick (scientist) =

British church minister and astronomer

Rev. Thomas Dick
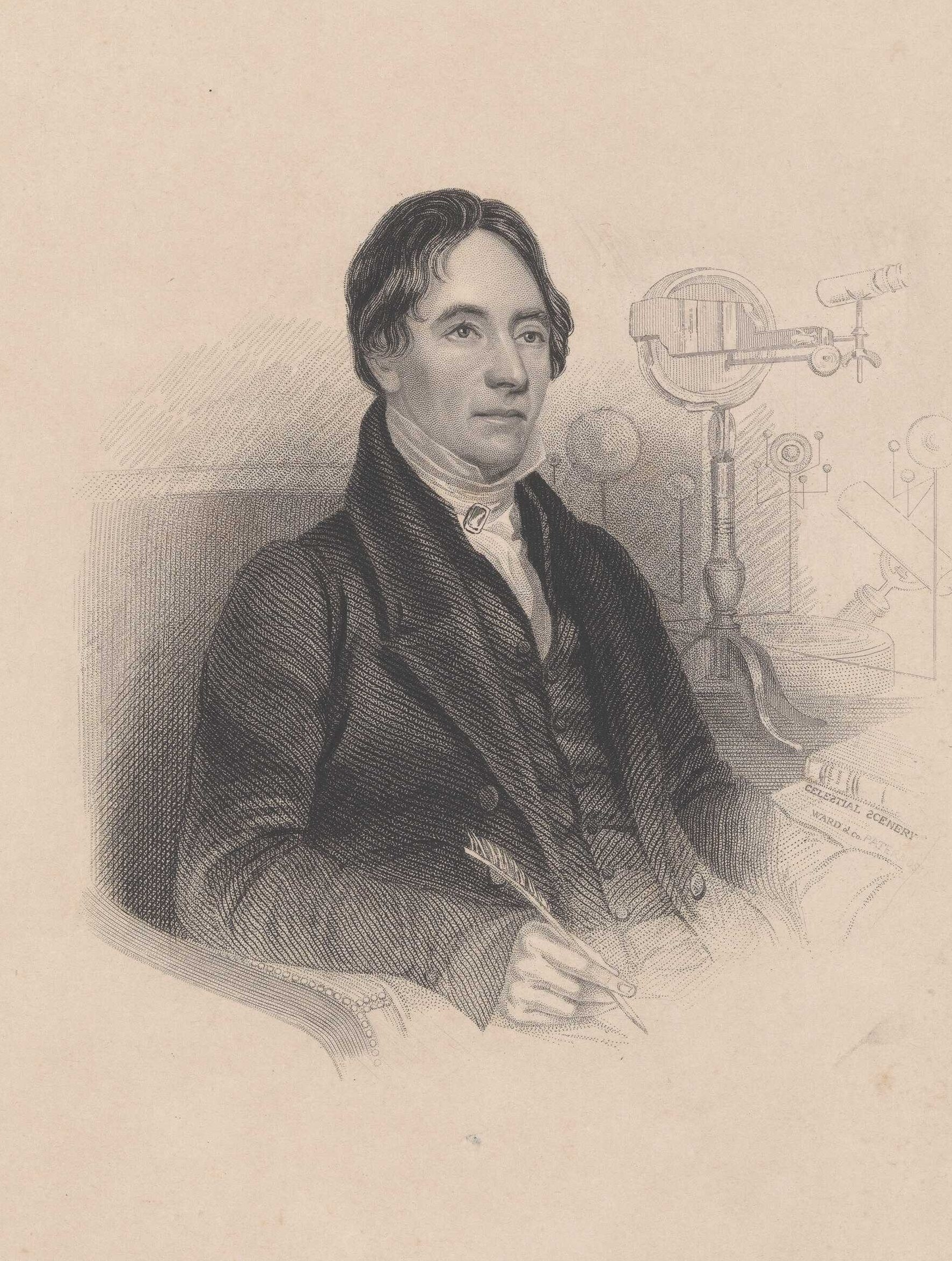
- Born: 24 November 1774; Hilltown, Dundee
- Died: 29 July 1857 (age 82); Broughty Ferry
- Scientific career
- Fields: Astronomy, Christian ministry

Reverend Thomas Dick (24 November 1774 – 29 July 1857), was a British church minister, science teacher and writer, known for his works on astronomy and practical philosophy, combining science and Christianity, and arguing for a harmony between the two.

== Life and career ==
=== Early life ===
Thomas was brought up in the strict tenets of the Presbyterian United Secession Church of Scotland. His father, Mungo Dick, was a small linen manufacturer, and he raised Thomas to work in this trade. When he was nine years old, he saw a brilliant meteor and this sparked a passion for astronomy. He read, sometimes even when seated at the loom, every book on the subject within his reach. He acquired an old pair of spectacles, contrived a machine for grinding the lenses to the proper shape, mounted them in pasteboard tubes, and began celestial observations. His parents, at first afflicted by his eccentricities, let him choose his own lifestyle when he was sixteen years old.

=== Education ===
Dick became assistant at a school in Dundee, and in 1794 entered the University of Edinburgh, supporting himself by private tuition. His philosophical and theological studies terminated, he set up a school at Dundee, took out a licence to preach in 1801, and officiated as probationer during some years at Stirling and elsewhere. After about fifteen months, he was excommunicated and lost his job there due to an affair with his servant. An invitation from the patrons to act as teacher in the Secession School at Methven resulted in a ten years' residence there, distinguished by efforts on his part towards popular improvement, including a zealous promotion of the study of science, the foundation of a people's library, and what was substantially a mechanic's institute. Under the name Literary and Philosophical Societies, adapted to the middling and lower ranks of the community, the extension of such establishments was recommended by him in five papers published in the Monthly Magazine in 1814; and, a year or two later, a society was organised near London on the principles there laid down, of which he was elected an honorary member.

As an undergraduate, Dick had several noteworthy classmates at the University of Edinburgh including Robert Brown, Joseph Black and Robert Jameson.

=== Writing career ===
On leaving Methven, Dick spent another decade as a teacher in Perth. During this interval he made his first independent appearance as an author. The Christian Philosopher, or the Connexion of Science and Philosophy with Religion, was published first during 1823. Several new editions were published during the next few years, the eighth edition being published in Glasgow during 1842. Its success determined the author's vocation to literature. He finally gave up school teaching in 1827, and built himself a small cottage- Forthill, later Herschel House- fitted up with an observatory and library, on a hill overlooking the Tay at Broughty Ferry, near Dundee. Here he wrote a number of works, scientific, philosophical, and religious, which acquired prompt and wide popularity both in the United Kingdom and the United States, and which are available on the internet and in print.

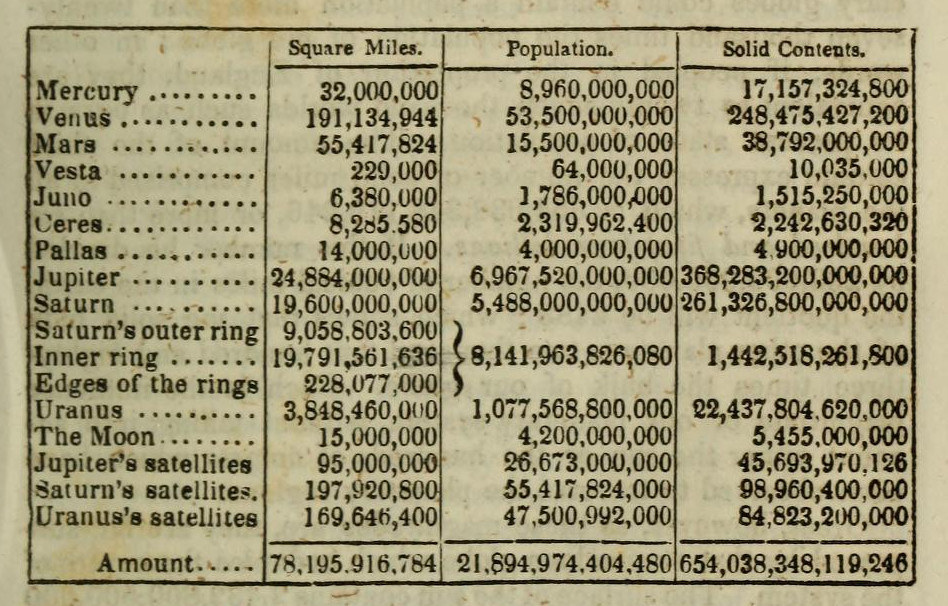
Table of population of the planets in the Solar System, based on their surface area and the population density of England

Dick believed in the plurality of worlds or cosmic pluralism, that every planet in the Solar System was inhabited. In his book Celestial scenery, or, The Wonders of the planetary system displayed, among many other topics, including the earliest known proposal of the earth's movements that later became known as continental drift and plate tectonics, he computed that the Solar System contained 21,894,974,404,480 (21+ trillion) inhabitants. This was done using the surface area of each planet and the population density of England. One of his articles that speculated about the possibility of communication with lunar inhabitants inspired the Great Moon Hoax.

Author William N. Griggs, in his 1852 booklet The Celebrated Moon Story: its Origins and Incidents, credits Dick's 1837 Celestial Scenery, collected in an anthology of Dick's works in 1851, as being an inspiration for Richard Adams Locke's moon hoax. It is worth noting that the earliest appearance of Locke's so-called Moon Hoax was a serialization of the story in August 1835 in a New York newspaper The Sun under the title of "Great Astronomical Discoveries Lately Made by Sir John Herschel, LL.D, F.R.S., &c at the Cape of Good Hope". Following publication in The Sun, the five part series was collected in a pamphlet of the same year which is said to have sold more than 20,000 copies almost instantly. It would seem that Griggs would be in error in attributing Dick's 1837 "Celestial Scenery" as an inspiration for Locke's 1835 serialization, particularly since Dick condemns Locke's hoax. The hoax was republished in 1859 by New York publisher William Gowans as The Moon Hoax: Or a Discovery That The Moon Has A Vast Population of Human Beings.

Dick worked with the Religious Tract Society to publish three of his books on science and religion, including one of his most successful books, The Telescope and Microscope.

An honorary degree of LL.D. was conferred upon him early in his literary career by Union College, New York, and he was admitted to the Royal Astronomical Society on 14 January 1853. A paper on Celestial Day Observations, giving the results of a series of observations on stars and planets in the daytime with a small equatorial at Methven in 1812–1813, was communicated by him in 1855 to the Monthly Notices of the Royal Astronomical Society (xv. 222). He had written on the same subject forty-two years previously in William Nicholson's Journal of Natural Philosophy (xxxvi. 109).

=== Later life ===
Despite the success of his books, however, Dick made such loose bargains with his publishers, that he derived little profits from them, and his poverty was relieved in 1847 by a pension of 50 pounds a year, and by a local subscription of 20 or 30 pounds. He died at the age of eighty-two, on 29 July 1857, and was buried at Broughty Ferry.

=== Influence and legacy ===
Thomas Dick's books enabled the advances made by the Scottish Enlightenment in the previous century to flourish alongside Victorian moral and religious thinking. They influenced many scientists, engineers, politicians, writers and thinkers. For instance David Livingstone, who inspired health care, education and the end of slavery in central Africa, regarded Dick's Philosophy of a Future State as his most important influence after the Bible.

In 1851, Mr. Thomas met William Wells Brown, who later would describe Dick as "an abolitionist... who is willing that the world should know that he hates the "peculiar institution" [of slavery]".

Asteroid (9855) Thomasdick is named after Thomas Dick.

== Selected works ==
Among his works may be mentioned:

- The Christian Philosopher, or the Connection of Science with Religion, Glasgow: William Collins; London: Whittaker & Co; (1823). His first popular work, from which he was sometimes known as "the Christian Philosopher".
- The Philosophy of a Future State, Glasgow, 1829, in which he developed a Christian theology compatible with the empirical science of Francis Bacon who advocated "a progressive and continuously increasing mastery over nature through the systematic and uninterrupted pursuit of knowledge."
- The Mental Illumination and Moral Improvement of Mankind, New York: 1836, developing a train of thought familiar to the writer during his upwards of twenty-six years, and partially indicated in several contributions to periodical literature.
- Celestial scenery; or, The wonders of the planetary system displayed; illustrating the perfections of deity and a plurality of worlds, New York, Harper & brothers, 1838.
- The Sidereal Heavens, and other subjects connected with Astronomy, London: 1840 and 1850, New York: 1844 (with portrait of author), presenting arguments for the plurality of worlds.
- The Practical Astronomer, London: 1845, giving plain descriptions and instructions for the use of astronomical instruments; besides several small volumes published by the Religious Tract Society on the Telescope and Microscope, The Atmosphere and Atmospheric Phenomena, and The Solar System.
