= William Cooke Taylor =

Irish writer

William Cooke Taylor (1800–1849) was an Irish writer, known as a journalist, historian and Anti-Corn Law propagandist.

== Life and work ==
He was born at Youghal on 16 April 1800. Through his mother he claimed descent from the regicide John Cooke.

He is best known for two works The Natural History of Society (1841) and Factories and the Factory System (1844). In the early 1840s he toured the northern English industrial centres and wrote considerably for the Anti-Corn Law League and his observations of the factories of Manchester and Bolton provide a first hand account of the depression at that time. In 1843 he became the editor of Anti-Corn Law's The League. He was extremely hostile to chartism and his defence of child labour in factories (on the grounds that it was preferable to starvation) attracted much hostile criticism.

He was educated at Trinity College, Dublin and gained a BA in 1825 and an LL.D in 1835. In 1829 he moved to London and began to contribute regularly to journals such as the Athenaeum of which he was deputy editor, Bentley’s Miscellany and The Art Journal. In London he worked as a writer for hire or, as his obituary puts it, "a writer for his daily bread". He published profusely throughout his career, writing on religion, history and a number of biographies, most notably that of Sir Robert Peel.

In Irish politics Taylor was a Whig, fiercely critical of the Penal Laws and supporting Catholic emancipation, but believing that continued union with Britain would bring about rapid political and economic modernisation. He was a strong advocate of the professedly non-denominational National School system, and his economic and religious views were heavily influenced by Richard Whately. Cooke Taylor was on friendly terms with Thomas Davis, whom he respected as a fellow-Trinity graduate, but in 1847-8 he engaged in government-sponsored journalism denouncing the Young Irelanders as communists, and was accused by Charles Gavan Duffy of having been hired to defame his country. This was unjust; while Taylor worked as a hired pen, it was for causes that he believed in.

He returned to Ireland for the last two years of his life where he worked as a statistician for the Irish Government before he died of cholera in 1849.

He was the son of Richard Taylor, a Youghal manufacturer and he married Marianne Taylor, his first cousin. He had four children, three girls and a boy, Richard Whateley Cooke Taylor, a factory inspector who also went on to write about the factory system in his books Introduction to a History of the Factory System (1886), The Modern Factory System (1891) and The Factory System and the Factory Acts (1894).

Taylor died at 20 Herbert Street, Dublin on 12 September 1849.

== Selected publications ==
- Historical Miscellany. London: Whittaker, Treacher and Co., 1829.
- Readings in Poetry. London: John W. Parker, [183-].
- History of France and Normandy. London: Whittaker, Treacher and Co., 1830.
- History of the Civil Wars of Ireland. London: Constable & Co., 1831.
- Readings in Biography. London: John W. Parker, 1833.
- History of Ireland. New York: J & J Harper, 1833.
- Outlines of Sacred History. London: John W. Parker, 1833.
- The History of Mohammedanism and its Sects. London: John W. Parker, 1834.
- Sanskrit Literature, London: Journal of the Royal Asiatic Society, 1834.
- On the nature and objects of statistical science. London: s.n., 1835.
- The History of the overthrow of the Roman Empire, and the foundation of the principal European states. London: Whittaker & Co., 1836.
- Chapters on Coronations, London: John W. Parker, 1838.
- Illustrations of the Bible from the Monuments of Egypt. London: Charles tilt, 1838; reissued as The Bible illustrated from Egyptian Monuments, Brookline: Adamant Media Corporation, 2001.
- The Natural History of Society in the Barbarous and Civilized State. New York: D. Appleton & Co., 1841.
- Anti-Corn Law agitation. Manchester: J. Gadsby, 1842.
- Notes of a tour in the manufacturing districts of Lancashire. London: Duncan and Malcolm, 1842.
- Romantic biography of the times of Elizabeth. London: Richard Bentley, 1842.
- An Illustrated Itinerary of the County of Lancaster. London: s.n., 1842.
- A Popular History of British India. London: James Madden & Co., 1842.
- The Hand Book of Silk, Cotton and Woollen Manufactures. London: Richard Bentley, 1843.
- Revolutions and Remarkable Conspiracies of Europe. London: Richard Bentley, 1843.
- Factories and the Factory System. London: Jeremiah How, 1844.
- The History of Christianity, From its Promulgation to its Legal establishment in the Roman Empire. London: John W. Parker, 1844.
- A Manual of Ancient & Modern History. New York: D. Appleton & Co., 1845.
- The Modern British Plutarch. London: Grant and Griffith, 1846.
- The National Portrait Gallery of Illustrations and Eminent Personages, Chiefly of the Nineteenth Century. 4 vols. London: Caxton Press, 1846-1848.
- Reminiscences of Daniel O'Connell. Dublin: Fisher, Son, & Co., 1847 [originally as by "A Munster Farmer"; reprinted 2004 by UCD Press with introduction and notes by Patrick Maume].
- Notes of a visit to the model schools in Dublin. Dublin: Hodges and Smith, 1848.
- On the Changes in the Locality of Textile Manufactures. Dublin: Hodges and Smith, 1848.
- Memoirs of the House of Orleans. London: Richard Bentley, 1849.
- Life and times of Sir Robert Peel. London: Peter Jackson, 1851.
- The Occult Sciences: Sketches of the Traditions and Superstitions of Past Times and the Marvels of the Present Day [with Edward Smedley, Henry Thompson and Elihu Rich]. London and Glasgow: Richard Griffin and Co., 1855.
