= Library of Entertaining Knowledge =

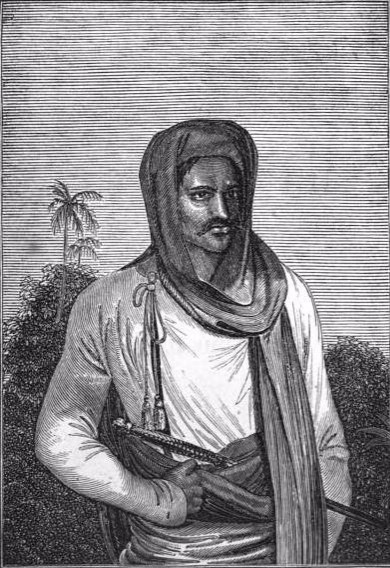
Portrait of a Kshatriya from The Hindoos (1835), in the Library of Entertaining Knowledge, vol. 21

The Library of Entertaining Knowledge was founded by the Society for the Diffusion of Useful Knowledge. The books appeared from 1829 to 1838, published in London by Charles Knight, and complemented the Society's Library of Useful Knowledge, which had not sold as well as hoped. The volumes were priced at 4s. 6d, more expensive than rival non-fiction series.

Number	Year	Title	Author Comments
1	1829 (31 March)	The Menageries. Quadrupeds, Described and Drawn From Living Subjects	James Rennie (anonymous)
	1829	A Description and History of Vegetable Substances used in the Arts, and in Domestic Economy: Timber Trees: Fruits	Robert Mudie (anonymous)
	1830	The Pursuit of Knowledge under Difficulties	George Lillie Craik (anonymous)
	1830	The New Zealanders	George Lillie Craik (anonymous)
24	1830	Insect Architecture	James Rennie (anonymous)
	1830	Insect Transformations	James Rennie (anonymous)
	1831	Paris and Its Historical Scenes (2 Vols.)	George Lillie Craik (anonymous)
	1831	Insect Miscellanies	James Rennie (anonymous)
	1831	The Architecture of Birds	James Rennie (anonymous)
35	1831–2	Pompeii (2 vols.)	William Barnard Clarke (anonymous), later expanded
	1831–5	Historical Parallels (2 vols.)	Arthur Thomas Malkin (anonymous)
	1832	Vegetable Substances Used for The Food of Man	
12	1832–3	Criminal Trials (2 vols.)	David Jardine (anonymous)
	1832-6	The British Museum. Egyptian Antiquities (2 vols.)	George Long (anonymous)
18, 19	1833	The British Museum. Elgin and Phigaleian Marbles (2 vols.)	Sir Henry Ellis (anonymous)
	1833	Vegetable Substances: Materials of Manufacture	
	1833	The Domestic Habits of Birds	James Rennie (anonymous)
	1834	History of British Costume	James Planché (anonymous)
	1834-5	The Hindoos (2 Vols.)	Revised by Friedrich August Rosen
	1835	The Faculties of Birds	James Rennie (anonymous)
	1836	The British Museum. The Townley Gallery (2 vols.)	Sir Henry Ellis (anonymous)
	1836	Manners and Customs of the Modern Egyptians (2 vols.)	Edward William Lane
	1836	The Chinese. A General Description of the Empire of China and its Inhabitants (2 vols.)	John Francis Davis
	1836	The Backwoods of Canada: Being Letters from the Wife of an Emigrant Officer	Catharine Parr Traill (anonymous)
	1837	Secret Societies of the Middle Ages	Thomas Keightley; published anonymously and against the author's wishes
	1838	Distinguished Men of Modern Times (4 Vols.)	Henry Malden (anonymous)
