= William Barnard Clarke =

English architect, cartographer, archaeological writer and art collector

William Barnard Clarke (1806–1865), sometimes mis-written Bernard, was an English architect, cartographer, archaeological writer and art collector, numismatist and literary translator. He was the founding president of the Architectural Society of London, 1831, and supervised the restoration of the Eleanor Cross at Waltham Cross in 1831–1832. Producing a celebrated series of maps or plans of European and Russian cities, and taking a strong interest in the discoveries at Pompeii, he travelled much in Europe and from the 1840s had his home and collections in the Grand Duchy of Baden. In 1865 he published an English translation of Goethe's Faust. He was an elder brother of the artist Harriet Ludlow Clarke, and a brother-in-law of Henry Bellenden Ker.

== Family ==
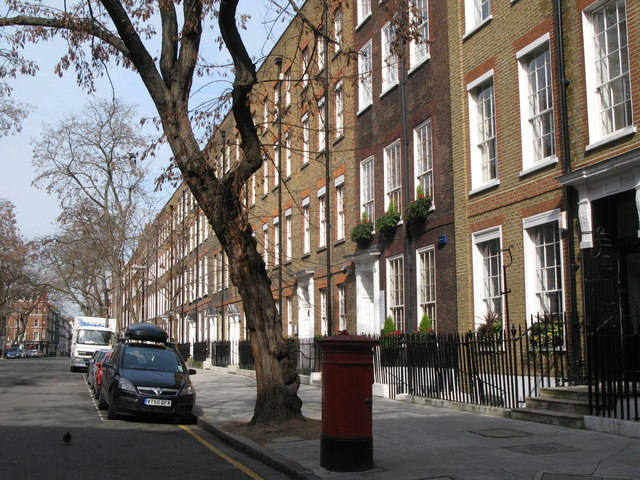
Bedford Row, London

William was born in Cheshunt, Hertfordshire in 1806, one of the eldest of several children of Edward Clarke of Cheshunt and his wife Sarah (née Linnell). The name "William Barnard" seems to have been given in homage to a cousin of that name, shipwright of Deptford, from whom Edward Clarke received a substantial legacy in 1805. At William's admission to St Paul's School, London at the age of 10 in 1817, his father was described as a Solicitor of Great Ormond Street in London. His elder sister Elizabeth Ann (born 1803) married the legal reformer Henry Bellenden Ker in 1823, but the connection was earlier: Elizabeth's brother Edward John Bellenden Clarke (Note: E.J.B. Clarke had a naval career, and became father of the Irish littérateuse Sarah Grand.) was christened with his sister Harriet Ludlow Clarke in October 1816, as of Great Ormond Street.

William's nearer brother, Frederick Christian Clarke (born Cheshunt c. 1807), was admitted attorney at the King's Bench assigned to Edward Clarke (their father), both of 9, Chapel Street, Bedford Row (in St Andrew, Holborn) in Michaelmas 1836. At much the same time Frederick became a Fellow of the Geological Society of London. During the 1840s their practice, in partnership with John Richards, appears at this address as "Richards, Clarke & Clarke", and there Edward, Frederick (solicitor), and William B. Clarke (architect) had their business premises in 1860. In 1861 it was also the home of Frederick and his large family, while father Edward, aged 92, was still living at Waltham Cross (Census).

William Barnard Clarke (of this parish) married Charlotte Brooks (of St George's, Bloomsbury) at St Andrew Holborn, London, by banns on 1 July 1830, witnessed by William Brooks. In 1833–35, as Fellow of the Royal Astronomical Society, he was resident at Upper Seymour Street, Euston Square. The death of Charlotte Clarke, wife of Mr. W.B. Clarke, Architect, is recorded for 30 March 1839, as of Albany Street, Regent's Park, where it is stated that she was the daughter of Major-General W. Brooks of the Honourable East India Company's service. Her burial took place on 9 April 1839 at Camden St Pancras parish church, as of Albany Street, where her age is given as 35. Major-General Brooks, who died in England on 30 October 1838, was Military Auditor General and Chief Engineer at the Bombay Presidency, India.

== Architect ==
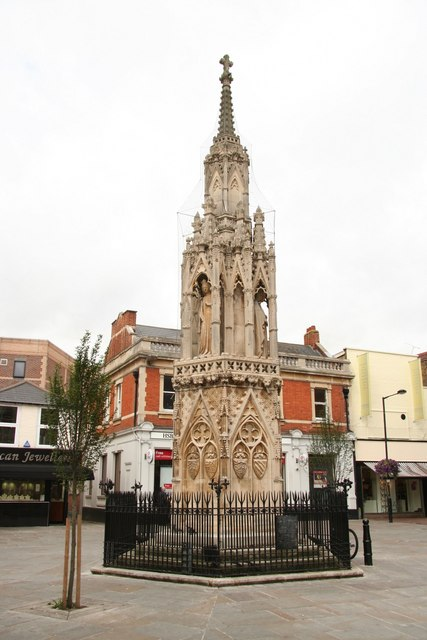
Waltham Cross restored. It has been repaired several times.

Clarke is said to have spent a long period in Rome during his youth, pursuing architectural studies, and visited and studied the remains at Pompeii. At its formation in 1831 Clarke became President of the Architectural Society of London, a predecessor organization to the Royal Institute of British Architects, with which it merged in 1842. While in Pompeii he made the friendship of the Swiss architect Melchior Berri, brother-in-law of the art historian Jacob Burckhardt, and through this connection Berri became an Honorary Member of the Society and of the Institute.

Clarke's 1831 proposal for the Botanical and Ornamental Garden to be formed on Primrose Hill, was exhibited at the 64th Royal Academy Exhibition in 1832, and was made to promote the scheme to the subscribers. In 1832 he received the thanks of the Royal Astronomical Society, for whom he had executed an engraving of the head of Isaac Newton, to embellish the Society's Diplomas for their Associates.

Waltham Cross

In 1831–34 Clarke promoted and supervised the restoration of the 13th-century Eleanor Cross in Waltham Cross, offering his services without remuneration, under a committee to which Edward Clarke, Esq., was Secretary. He submitted a "Geometrical Elevation" of his proposed restoration to the President of the Society of Antiquaries of London in order to enlist the Society's approval and support. A "preview" appreciation is given in the Gentleman's Magazine for 1832, which refers to the posture of the sculpted figures, and problems of interpretation relating to the completion of the pinnacle or spire of the cross.

The restoration, which was funded by subscription, was approved for its sympathetic treatment of the Gothic monument. On 17 May 1834 a notable company gathered at the Falcon Inn in Waltham (part of which had been demolished improve the environs of the Cross), to commemorate the result. This meeting was chaired by William Harrison, K.C., and addressed by the elderly Sir Abraham Hume (accompanied by his grandson the Viscount Alford), by Richard Taylor for the Society of Antiquaries of London, and by Sir Richard Westmacott for the Royal Academy. Clarke was especially commended, and he and the Architectural Society were toasted: he replied, explaining the purposes of that Society, and describing how he had first surveyed the cross ten years previously.

Continuing presidency

In 1836 Thomas Larkins Walker, introducing the first part of the third, posthumous volume of Augustus Pugin's work Examples of Gothic Architecture, dedicated it to the officers of the Architectural Society, headed by William Barnard Clarke, F.R.A.S., as President. He continued as President until 1837–38, when he resigned on the grounds that he was visiting the continent for a prolonged period.

Some of his addresses to the Society survive, and in the sixth, of 1836–37, he protests the insufficiency of his years and taste for the important role they have conferred upon him. In his address for the session 1837–38, delivered 7 November 1837, in which he welcomed the new reign (of Queen Victoria) and looked forward to an age of public welfare in which the Fine Arts and Architecture should flourish, he opened in a similar way:

"Gentlemen – Having been elected for the eighth time your President, the duty of opening our present Session devolves upon me. I could have wished that the honour of the Presidentship of the Architectural Society had been bestowed upon some other individual better able, by his learning, talent, and genius, to fill this high and important office, rather than so humble and unknown a person as myself."

Gallery of British Artists

Clarke was the general author of an Art folio series in 26 parts, The Modern Gallery of British Artists, each part containing three engravings by reputable engravers, after paintings by living artists. Each engraving carries some pages of descriptive letterpress. Taking its name from the Gallery of the Royal Society of British Artists in Suffolk Street (established 1823–24), the series was published by Charles Tilt and printed by Richard Taylor in London in 1836. A view by Clarke of the restored Waltham Cross appeared in the middle of Volume I. By 1838 it consisted of 77 plates, and was advertised in an "Improved Edition" complete in two volumes, with the option of early impression proofs on India paper for an additional charge. Here the general authorship of W.B. Clarke (as President of the Architectural Society) is plainly stated.

== Cartographer ==
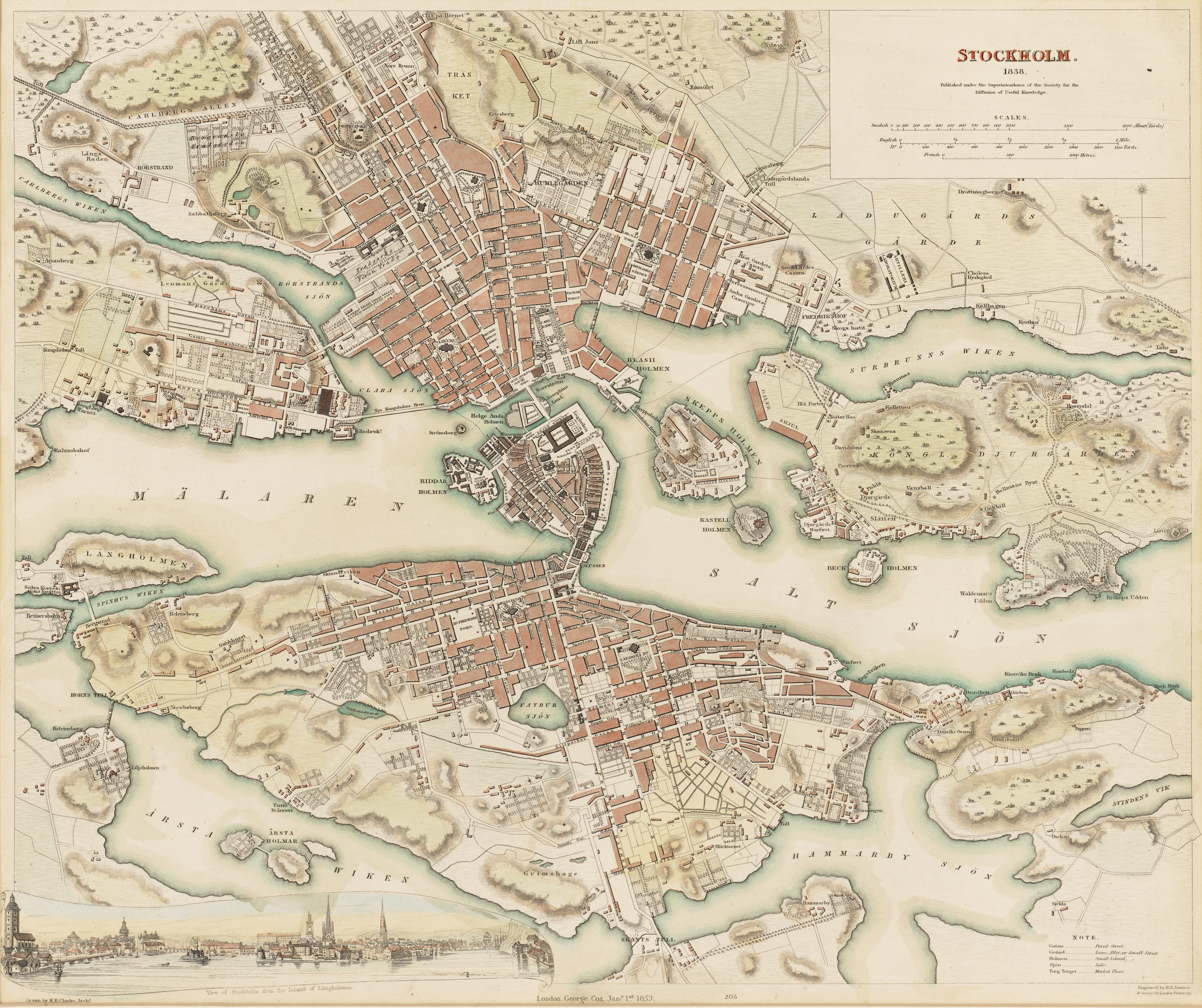
Map of Stockholm by W.B. Clarke 1838

Clarke was an active member of, and contributor to, the Society for the Diffusion of Useful Knowledge, founded in 1826. The political, intellectual and social context of this Society is richly described in the Memoirs of the publisher Charles Knight, who considered Clarke's kinsman Henry Bellenden Ker to be "the most fertile in projects of any member" of the Society's Committee. (The Royal Society, to which Ker was admitted Fellow in 1819, dispensed with his company in 1831.)

Among Clarke's first productions at their behest, of 1830, was a Celestial Atlas, a set of six maps of the stars, deriving and combining information from a range of scientifically-informed sources. These were produced by the Society under the direction of Sir John Lubbock, and won admiring praise both for their excellence of execution, and for their availability at a moderate price, supporting the Society's aims of dissemination. An accomplished artist-draftsman and cartographer, Clarke now devoted the best part of a decade to the production of a series of maps of European cities. Although they were not fully original surveys, he often travelled to verify points in question, and illustrated them with architectural views and cameos which were usually arranged along the foot of each sheet.

Clarke's Plan of Ancient Rome, with architectural views, was engraved by J. and C. Walker and published under the superintendence of the Society in 1830, and had a companion Plan of Modern Rome. Under the same auspices his plan of Warsaw (engraved by T. E. Nicholson) is dated 1831, his Milan and Frankfurt am Main 1832, his Berlin, and his Turin, with three views, 1833 (both engraved by J. Henshall); his Paris and St Petersburg are of 1834. His London, Florence, Genoa, Venice and Amsterdam (engraved by Benjamin Rees Davies, 1789–1872) are dated 1835, his Moscow 1836, and his Naples, with architectural view (engraved by T. Bradley) is of 1838. His Scandinavian efforts include Copenhagen, with a panorama (J. Henshall), dated 1837, and Stockholm (1838). Clarke's plans and maps, of which he produced many, are still admired and collected.

To 1836 belongs the modest Guide to Hayling (1836), an account of Hayling Island in Hampshire as an early tourist resort, which is "embellished with wood engravings from sketches by W.B. Clarke, architect" (engraved by J. Jackson). It is not clear that Clarke was responsible for anything more than the sketches, though the view of the "Billiard-room, Cosmorama and Reading-room" (facing p. 32) is like the architectural elevations on his city plans.

== Pompeii, and Italian travels ==
Clarke prepared and assembled the materials for a richly-illustrated two-volume work about the buildings and artefacts excavated at Pompeii, for Charles Knight's Library of Entertaining Knowledge, which appeared first in 1831–1832 for Baldwin and Craddock and was republished in 1836. This went into two German editions of 1834–35 and 1836 through Bäumgärtners Buchhandlung of Leipzig.

In around 1840, about the time of his first wife's death, William Barnard Clarke's attributed maps and drawings for the Society for Diffusion of Useful Knowledge come to an end (though many were republished during the 1840s until the Society was wound up in 1848). That his travels now took him to Italy is suggested by a paper by W.B. Clarke On the Arch of Augustus at Rimini and the Gate of Augustus at Fano (an architectural study suggesting different phases of construction), which appeared in 1841 in the Journal of the Rome Corresponding Archaeological Institute.

Clarke is said to have devoted a second lengthy stay in Italy, in Rome, Florence and Naples, where he built up his collection of paintings and sculptures, together with a great number of valuable coins and medals. He made further travels in Switzerland, the Netherlands, and in various parts of Germany in pursuit of new additions. An important part of his collections was acquired at Pompeii when excavations were proceeding. His two-volume work on Pompeii, admired by professionals, was reissued in a revised form in London in 1846, declaring that it was "chiefly from the MS journals and drawings of William Clarke, Esq., architect": the woodcuts are as in the earlier work. The title also appears as Pompeii: Its Destruction and Rediscovery in 1847.

== The Harveys of Thorpe ==
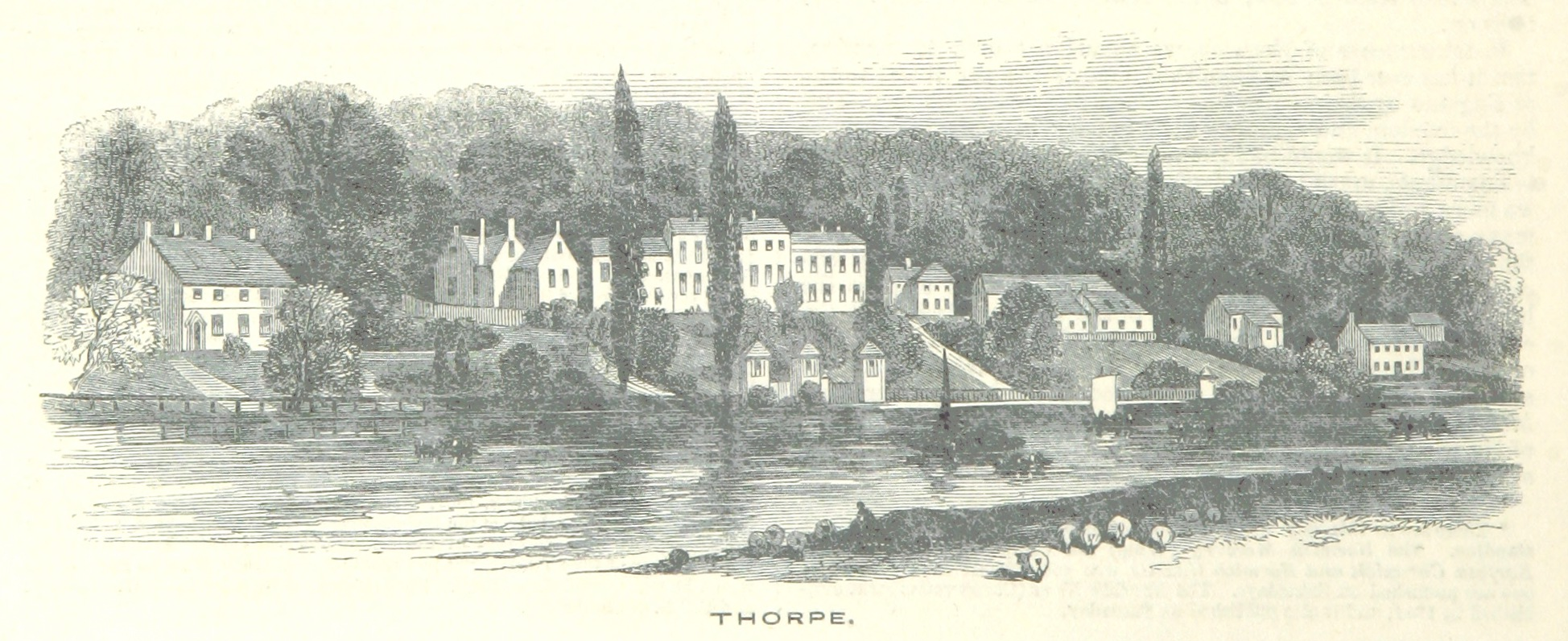
Thorpe next Norwich in 1851

In March 1838 Augustus John Harvey was (by his mother Mary Anne Julia Harvey, on the oath of William Barnard Clarke) articled and assigned to Clarke's brother Frederick as Attorney and, as of Eaton Square, passed successfully through his Hilary term law examinations in 1844. Augustus John and his elder brother George Frederick Harvey were the sons of George Harvey of Thorpe Grange, Thorpe-next-Norwich, Norfolk, and his wife Mary Anne Julia (née Beevor), whom he had married at Norwich in 1816. George, son of John Harvey (1755–1842) and Frances Kerrison (1765–1809) of Thorpe, had drowned in a bathing accident in 1831 while holidaying at Winterton-on-Sea, Norfolk, from his usual London residence of Tavistock Square.

Grand Duchy of Baden

By 1846 William Barnard Clarke had married George's widow, for in that year they were co-defendants in an English Chancery litigation brought by George Frederick Harvey, plaintiff, probably to do with rights of inheritance or jointure. He is said to have moved first to Freiburg-im-Breisgau, in the Grand Duchy of Baden, during the mid-1840s, and to have remained there until 1850 when he moved into a house which he had built for himself at Littenweiler nearby. He involved himself in the turbulent affairs of those years, for on 12 May 1850, as a resident of Freiburg, he was arrested for "presiding at a democratic assembly at Waldkirch". The house at Littenweiler had specially furnished rooms for the display of his collections, where they frequently aroused the admiration of experts.

His second marriage lasted until 1856, when Mary Ann Julia Clarke, wife of William Barnard Clarke and daughter of the late Dr Beevor, died of apoplexy at Littenweiler. After their mother's death, and following an Act of Parliament "To Facilitate Leases and Sales of Inherited Estates" (20 Victoria), George Frederick and Augustus John Harvey, and their sisters Josephine and Caroline, brought a Chancery suit in 1857 against William Barnard Clarke and other relatives. They introduced a petition in April 1858 for the right to sell the mansion at Thorpe with its outbuildings, pleasure gardens, etc. By May 1858 Clarke had been dismissed out of the case, and the Harveys' petition was granted.

The circumstances had, meanwhile, altered when Clarke made his third marriage, in March 1858, to Pauline Föhrenbach of Herbolzheim (with consent of her father), at the house of Frederic Hamilton, Her Majesty's Chargé d'affaires at Baden-Baden. His name is listed in directories at the office of his father and brother at Bedford Row in 1856 and 1860.

== Translator of Goethe's Faust ==
William Barnard Clarke the architect is certainly identified with the author of one of the early English translations of Faust, Johann Wolfgang von Goethe's masterwork of German literature. The volume which passes under Clarke's name, Translation of Goethe's Faust Parts I and II was published in London and Freiburg-im-Breisgau in 1865, and its preface is dated from Littenweiler, September 1865. The title-page styles him "Architect and Honorary Member of the Architectural and Engineering Society of Helvetia" (i.e. The Swiss Society of Engineers and Architects, founded 1837), and a sub-title adds: "Fellow of the former Architectural Society of London founded in 1832".

In his "Preface" he states that his translation is the fruit of 20 years' continual labour: it is valued by modern scholars for comments noting the received attribution of the 1821 translation of Faust to Samuel Taylor Coleridge. Since his publisher Charles Knight had (in his first venture publishing The Etonian in 1820–21) received contributions from Derwent Coleridge, Ker had been a patron of William Blake's, and William Hart Coleridge was curate at St Andrew Holborn during Clarke's childhood, Clarke's acquaintance from his younger days afforded various possible means for the transmission of this belief.

In other respects, his own translation is considered the most flawed, "a worthless labour in all respects" by a German authority, bristling with misunderstandings of the German and unmasterly and ungrammatical in its use of English. An English study of Goethe's work (of 1885) utterly deplored Clarke's inability to scan or rhyme, to say nothing of his lack of style or poetic instinct. "A preface in which the author is very free with his criticisms leads one to expect something superlatively excellent in the latest venture; but this translation of W.B. Clarke is simply atrocious." He treats the final lines as follows:

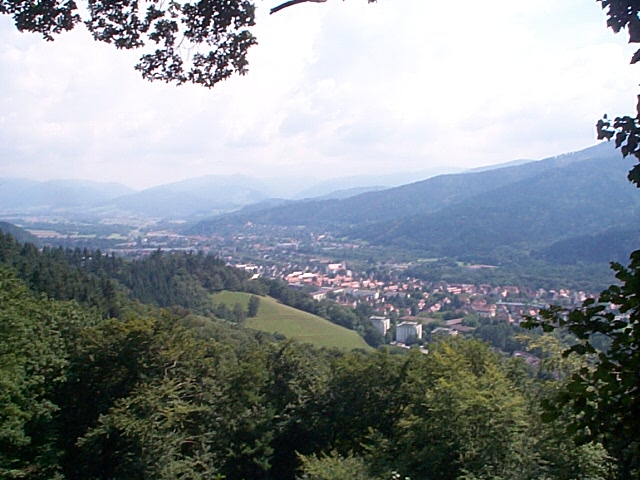
View of Freiburg-im-Breisgau

"Das Unbeschreibliche
Hier ist es getan;
Das Ewig-Weibliche
Zieht uns hinan."

"The Indescribable
Here has been shown,
The feminine ever will
Draw us high on."

Death in Freiburg

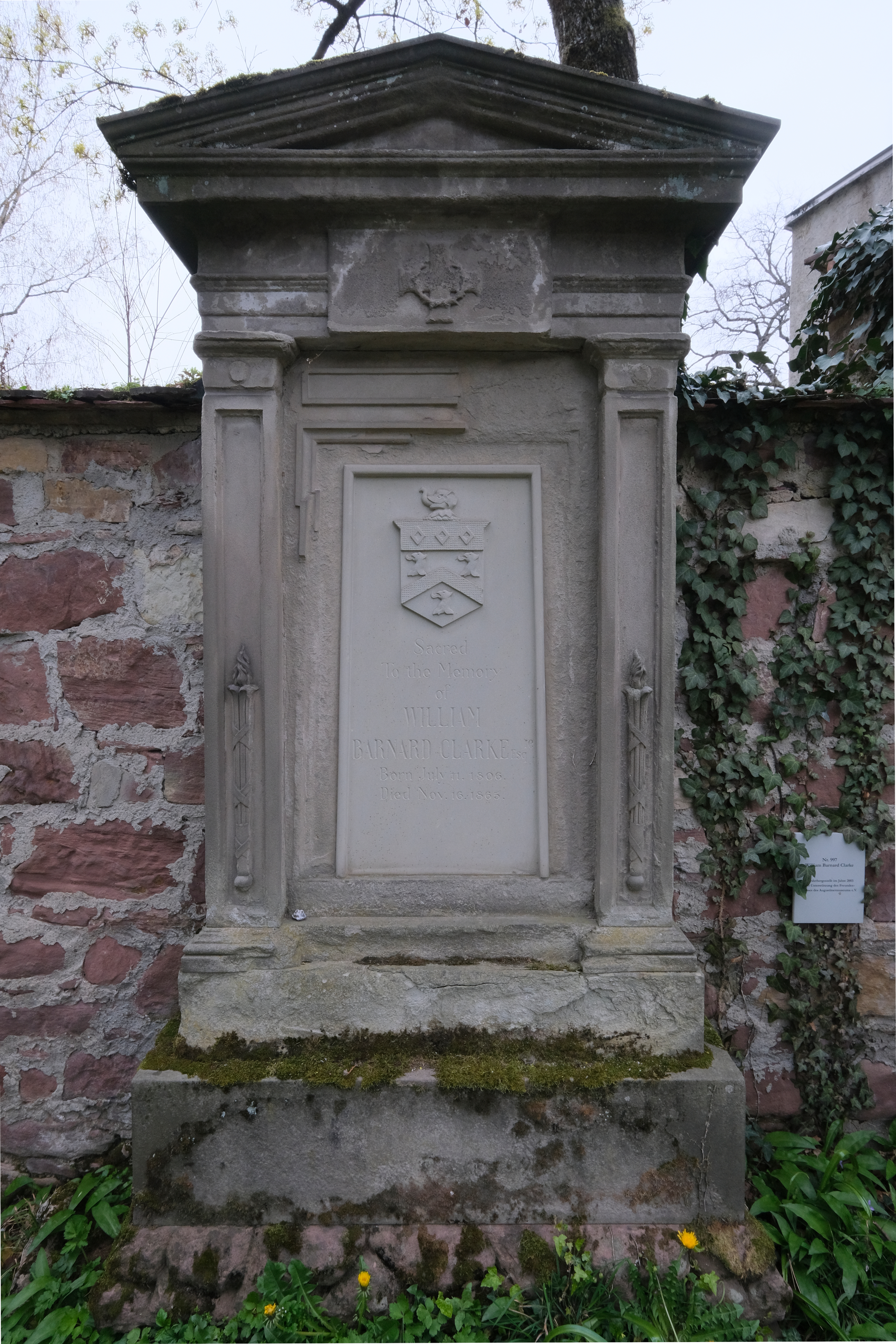
Gravestone in Freiburg-im-Breisgau with reconstructed carving

A glass plate photograph in the Freiburg Archives records Clarke's carved gravestone at the Alter Friedhof (Old Cemetery) with the life-dates 1806–1865. The original carving weathered over time, but it was reconstructed in 2003. Documents about his inheritance are stored in the Landesarchiv Baden-Württemberg.

The British Library's copy of the Faust translation was presented in 1870 by Frederick Clarke, when the author's widow was living in Germany. She is said to have made a bequest in Germany of her husband's collection of antique marble portrait-busts. His collections from the excavations at Pompeii went in the 1860s to the Karlsruhe Antiquarian Society (Karlsruhe Altertumsverein), and he sold his valuable coin collection in Paris. In 1884 the Staatliche Kunsthalle in Karlsruhe expressed a strong interest in acquiring remaining collections after Grand Duke Friedrich I had commissioned no less a person than Jacob Burckhardt to compile a report on them. They were, however, purchased for Freiburg in 1896.

Henry Bellenden Ker (died 1871) and his wife Elizabeth (Clarke), and her sister Harriet Ludlow Clarke (died 1866), retired to Cannes: Elizabeth Ker's sketchbook of north Italian and Swiss landscapes, formed between 1830 and 1858, is held in the Penn Libraries at the University of Pennsylvania. Harriet and Elizabeth are depicted in a painting of 1844 by Sir Charles Lock Eastlake.

== The Barnard connection ==
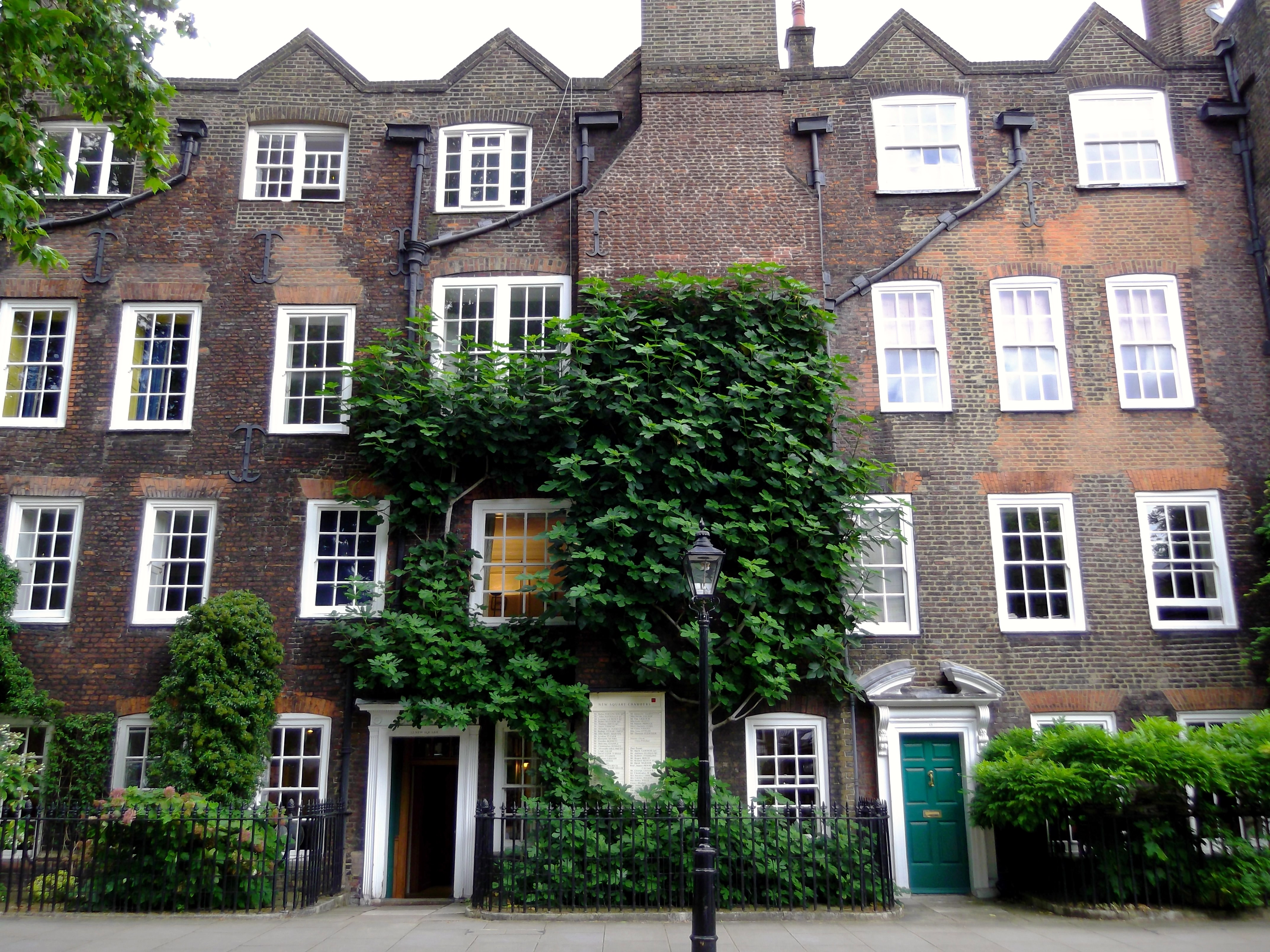
New Square, Lincoln's Inn, London

The shipwrights William Barnard (1735–1795) and John Bardwell Barnard (1738–1783) were sons of John Barnard, a member of the Tacket Street non-conformist meeting hall in Ipswich, Suffolk. In 1765 John Bardwell Barnard married Esther Clarke of St Saviour's, Southwark, and in 1766 Edward Clarke (1745–1791), a Quaker brewer of Southwark, had licence to marry Ann, daughter of William Coffin, hop-factor of Southwark. The Barnards developed their shipyards at Deptford and Rotherhithe, and J.B. Barnard in 1783 bequeathed a legacy to Edward Clarke and his heirs, making his own brother William his executor.

William Coffin died in 1787 remembering his grandson Edward Clarke, only son of Edward Clarke the brewer: Edward junior, then of 9, Lincoln's Inn New Square, witnessed and affirmed his father's will of 1791 (which made William Barnard an executor), and witnessed William Barnard's will in 1795. William's elder son, William Barnard junr., died (aged 29) in 1805 making a legacy to his cousin and executor Edward Clarke, who in the following year christened his own son William Barnard Clarke. Edward's descent from William Coffin is also illustrated in a series of manorial deeds relating to Ewell in Surrey: one of his maiden aunts, Mary Coffin, was buried at Cheshunt in 1813.

== Disambiguation ==
None of the notable William Barnard Clarkes should be confused with William Branwhite Clarke of East Bergholt (1798–1878), a geologist clergyman from Suffolk, UK, who made his career in Australia: and who, to exhaust the possibilities of confusion, published a poem about "Pompeii" in 1819, and produced fine architectural plans of the observatory at Parramatta in 1825, published in 1835. The attribution of the authorship of the Faust translation to William Barnard Clarke (physician) (1807–1894) is clearly mistaken.
