= English Cyclopaedia =

The English Cyclopaedia: A new dictionary of universal knowledge (London, 1854–1862, 4to, 23 vols., 12,117 pages; supplements, 1869–1873, 4 vols., 2858 pages), was published by Charles Knight, based on the Penny Cyclopaedia, of which he had the copyright. He was assisted by Alexander Ramsay and James Thorne. It was sometimes popularly referred to as Knights Encyclopedia.

It is in four divisions, each alphabetical, and very unequal:

1. Geography (4 volumes and supplement)
2. Natural history (4 volumes and supplement)
3. Biography (with 703 lives of living persons; 6 volumes and supplement)
4. Arts and sciences (8 volumes and supplement)

A supplement in four volumes, one for each section, was published between 1869 and 1873, together with a synoptical index. No further editions of the English Cyclopaedia, however, it served as the basis of the Everyman's Encyclopaedia in 1913.
