= George Long (scholar) =

English writer and classical scholar (1800–1879)

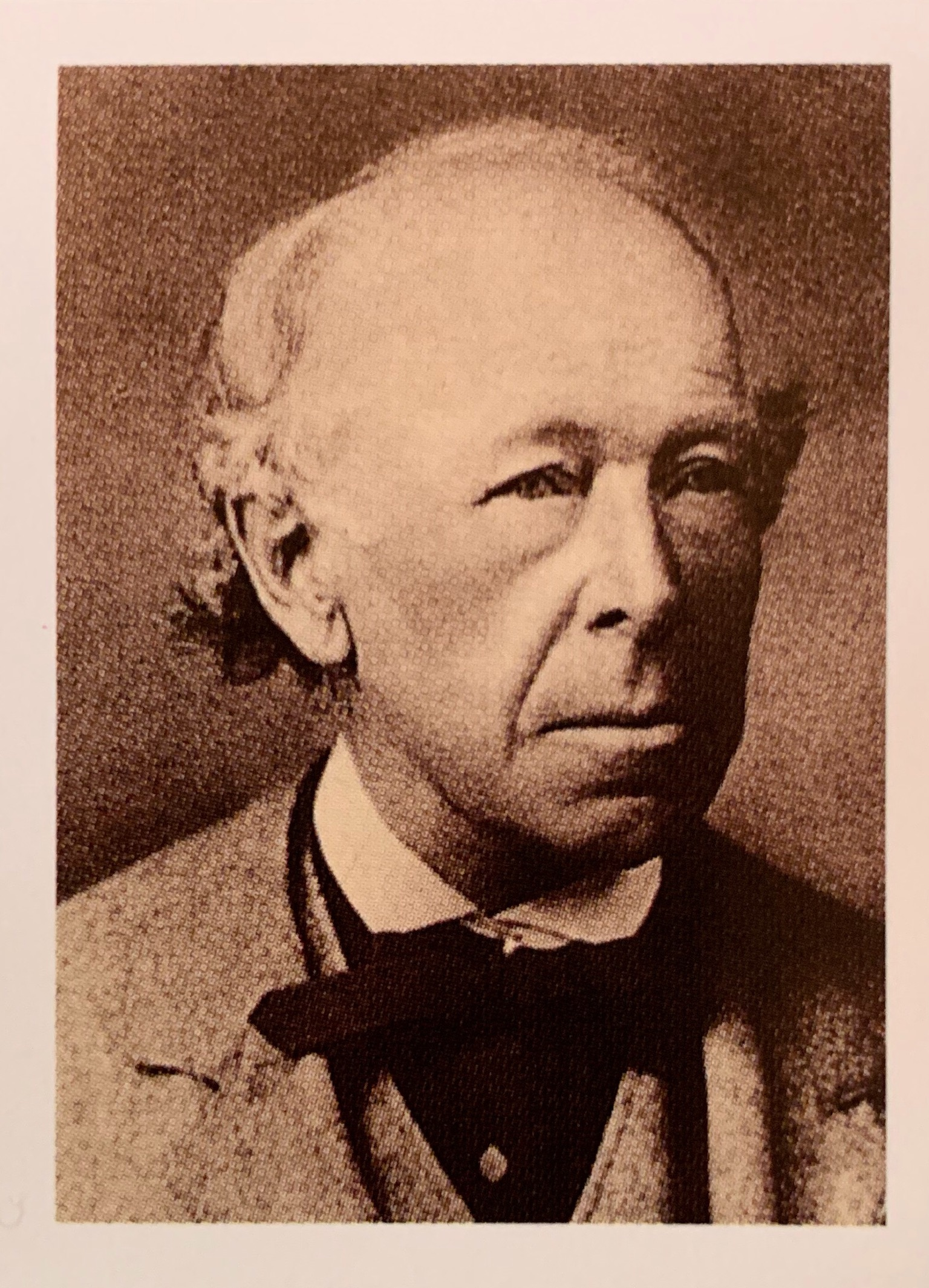
- Portrait of George Long
- Born: 4 November 1800; Poulton-le-Fylde, Lancashire, England
- Died: 10 August 1879 (aged 78); Chichester, West Sussex, England
- Occupations: Writer; scholar

Academic background
- Education: St John's College, Cambridge, Trinity College, Cambridge
- Doctoral advisor: Lord Macaulay

Academic work
- Discipline: Language, Linguistics, History and Law
- Sub-discipline: Latin, Greek, Civil Law, Jurisprudence, Roman law
- Institutions: University College London, Middle Temple, Brighton College, University of Virginia

Signature
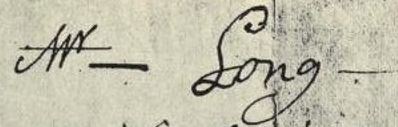

George Long (4 November 1800 – 10 August 1879) was an English writer and classical scholar. He is best known for his books Meditations of Marcus Aurelius (1862) and Discourses of Epictetus (1877). Alongside Charles Knight, he was the editor of the Penny Cyclopaedia, and he was widely known throughout England.

== Life ==
Long was born at Poulton-le-Fylde, Lancashire, the son of James Long, West India merchant. He was educated at Macclesfield Grammar School, St John's College, Cambridge and later Trinity College, Cambridge.

He was Craven university scholar in 1821 (bracketed with Lord Macaulay and Henry Maiden), wrangler and senior chancellor's medallist in 1822 and became a fellow of Trinity in 1823. In 1824 he was elected professor of ancient languages in the new University of Virginia at Charlottesville, but after four years returned to England as the first professor of Greek at the newly founded University College in London. Long owned (or possibly hired) a slave named Jacob while he was at the university.

In 1842 he succeeded T. H. Key as Professor of Latin at University College; in 1846–1849 he was reader in jurisprudence and civil law in the Middle Temple, and finally (1849–1871) classical lecturer at Brighton College. Subsequently, he lived in retirement at Portfield, Chichester, in receipt (from 1873) of a Civil List pension of £100 a year obtained for him by Gladstone.

He was one of the founders (1830), and for twenty years an officer, of the Royal Geographical Society; an active member of the Society for the Diffusion of Useful Knowledge, for which he edited the quarterly Journal of Education (1831–1835) as well as many of its text-books; the editor (at first with Charles Knight, afterwards alone) of the Penny Cyclopaedia and of Knight's Political Dictionary; and a member of the Society for Central Education instituted in London in 1837.

He contributed the Roman law articles to Smith's Dictionary of Greek and Roman Antiquities, and wrote also for the companion dictionaries of Biography and Geography. He is remembered, however, mainly as the editor of the Bibliotheca Classica series—the first serious attempt to produce scholarly editions of classical texts with English commentaries—to which he contributed the edition of Cicero's orations (1851–1862).

== Works ==
Among his other works are:

- Summary of Herodotus (1829)
- edition of Herodotus (1830–1833)
- edition Xenophon's Anabasis (1831)
- revised editions of Rev Arthur Macleane's Juvenal and Persius (1867) and Horace (1869)
- the Civil Wars of Rome
- a translation with Aubrey Stewart and notes of thirteen of Plutarch's Lives (1844–1848)
- translation of the Meditations of Marcus Aurelius (1862)
- translation of the Discourses of Epictetus (1877)
- Decline of the Roman Republic (1864–1874), 5 vols

See HJ Matthews, in Memoriam, reprinted from the Brighton College Magazine, 1879.

== Family ==
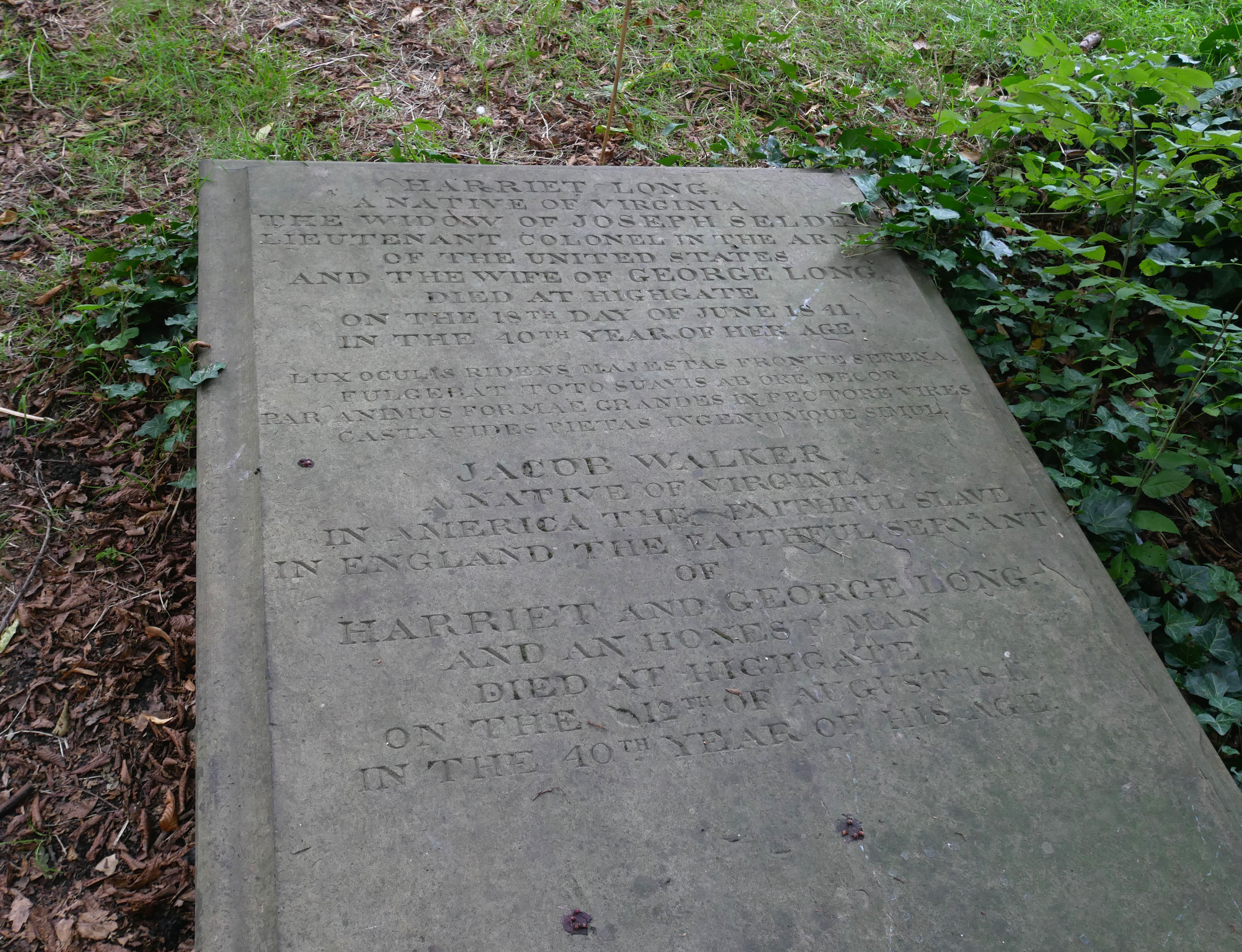
The tomb of Harriet Long and Jacob Walker at Saint Mary's Tower in Hornsey, in 2022

During his time in Virginia, Long married Harriet Selden (nee Gray), the widow of Lieutenant-Colonel Joseph Selden, a judge of the Supreme Court of Arkansas. When the Longs returned to England in 1828, they took with them their Virginia-born slave, Jacob Walker. As slavery was no longer legal in England, Jacob is listed as a manservant on the 1841 census. The Longs had four children together, along with two daughters from Harriet's previous marriage. Harriet died from cancer in 1841, and when Jacob Walker died two months later from smallpox following an inoculation, he was interred in the same grave, which is now listed Grade II on the National Heritage List for England.
