= James Rennie (naturalist) =

Scottish naturalist (1787–1867)

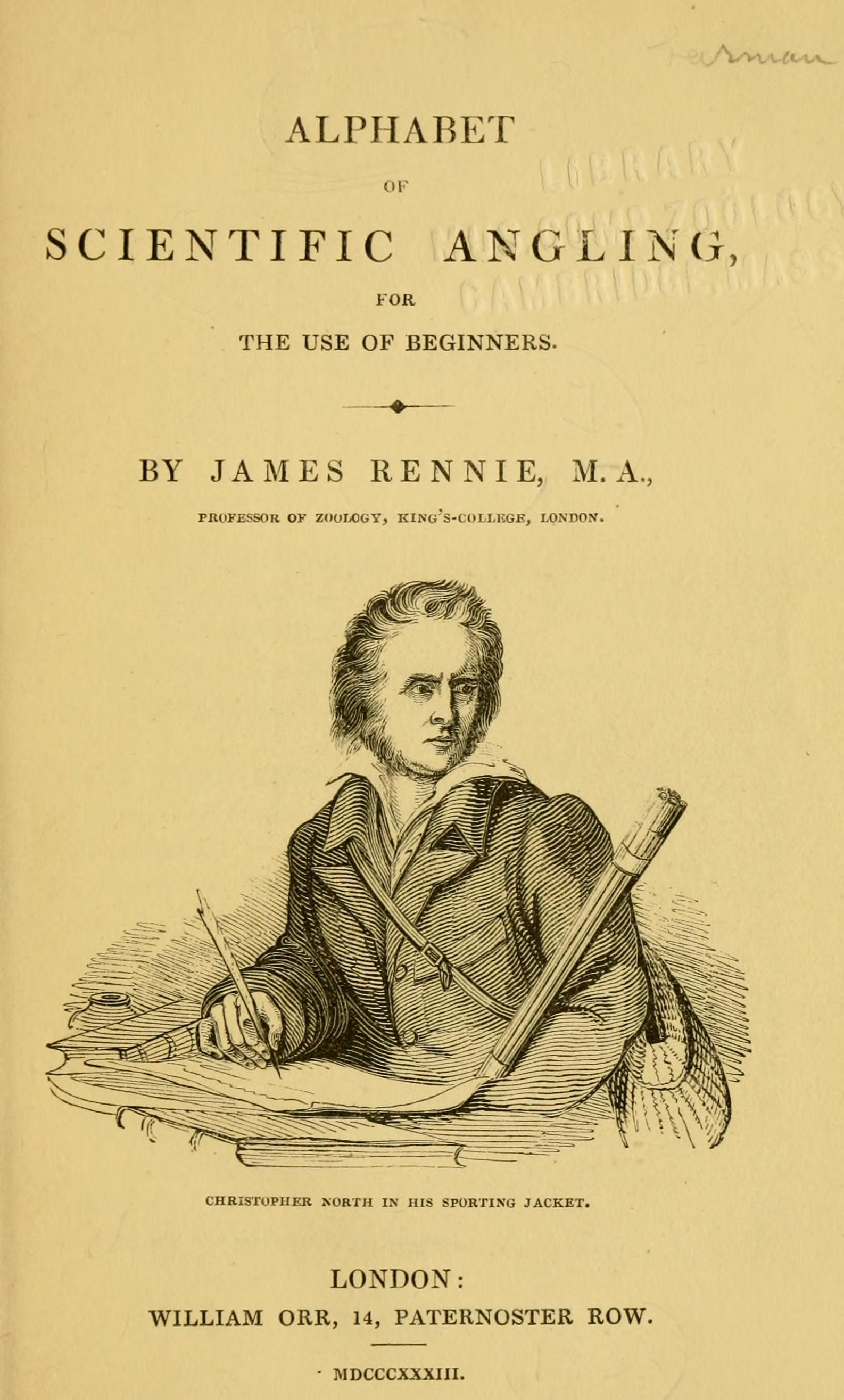
Rennie's Alphabet of Scientific Angling For the Use of Beginners (1833), showing John Wilson using his pen name Christopher North

James Rennie (26 February 1787, Sorn – 1867, Adelaide) was a Scottish naturalist.

== Life ==
In 1815 he graduated M.A. from Glasgow University where he had previously studied natural sciences, and took holy orders. In 1821 he moved to London. From 1830 to 1834 he was professor of natural history and zoology at King's College. From then on he made his living as a natural history author.

Rennie emigrated to Australia, 1840, where he ran the College High School in Elizabeth Street, Sydney, with an emphasis on the arts and natural history.

== Works ==
Rennie wrote, among many other books, The Natural History of Insects published by John Murray (1829) and co-authored with John Obadiah Westwood; Insect Architecture (1830), a popular work originally in the Library of Entertaining Knowledge but reissued in 1857 by John Murray; and Alphabet of Botany For Use of Beginners (1834).

Among the books that Rennie edited was Gilbert White's The Natural History and Antiquities of Selborne in 1833. He also gave lectures, including the 1831 Royal Institution Christmas Lecture.

== Publications ==
- The Architecture of Birds (1831), The Library of Entertaining Knowledge. London: Charles Knight, Pall Mall East.
- The Magazine of Botany and Gardening (1833)
- The Faculties of Birds (1835), The Library of Entertaining Knowledge. London: Charles Knight, 22 Ludgate Street.

== Bibliography ==
- Anonym 1868 "Death of Professor Rennie" Entomologist's Monthly Magazine (3) 4 1867-68 191.
- Salmon, M. A. 2000 The Aurelian Legacy. British Butterflies and their Collectors. Martins, Great Horkesley, Harley Books 1-431(142–143).
- Lawson, E. 1995 The Natural Art of Louisa Atkinson. Sydney, State Library of NSW Press. 42–43
