= Tim Arnold =

Tim Arnold may refer to:

- Tim Arnold (musician) (born 1975), British musician
- Tim Arnold (newsreader) (born 1960), British newsreader

== See also ==
- Tom Arnold (disambiguation)
