= Tim Arnold (newsreader) =

British news anchor

Timothy Arnold (born 1960) was the first solo news anchor on Sky News in the UK. Born in Slough, United Kingdom, he joined the Windsor, Slough and Eton Express newspaper in 1979 as an indentured apprentice, and a chance conversation with disc jockey Tony Prince resulted in an invitation to edit Radio Luxembourg's English language news bulletins on a freelance basis. A teleprinter breakdown meant he had to read one bulletin by telephone, and he became the first journalist ever to read a bulletin on the station.

== Career ==
Arnold worked for a number of radio and television stations before moving to Plymouth Sound Radio in 1983, where he became assistant head of news, and relaunched the flagship evening news and current affairs programme, Plymouth Sound Reports.

He moved to BBC Belfast as a reporter in 1987, where he gained a world exclusive when he discovered and interviewed the priest acting as the intermediary between the Royal Ulster Constabulary and the Provisional IRA over the dispute surrounding the burial of Larry Marley.

Arnold then moved to London where he worked as a reporter for BBC TV's BBC London Plus programme, under the guidance of producer Neil Hughes, at the BBC's aging Lime Grove Studios, and as a newsreader for the British Forces Broadcasting Service, BFBS.

He was invited to join the launch team of Sky News in 1989, where he was the first solo news anchor. He also reported on the IRA killing of Eastbourne MP Ian Gow, and was beaten up on camera during the poll tax riot in London's Trafalgar Square. Arnold's assailant was later jailed.

He left the station after it merged with British Satellite Broadcasting, to become a freelance public relations consultant.

== Arnold Broadcast ==
He started Arnold Broadcast in 1997, dealing with crisis communications, media training, and corporate video productions. One of Arnold's clients was the Port of London, where he advised the authority on the media implications of the government inquiry into the Marchioness disaster. He also advised the education department of the former Soviet republic of Georgia on how to deal with a free press after the fall of communism and has trained British Council staff in London, Africa, South America and the countries of the former Soviet Union.

Arnold has worked with a range of corporate clients on reputation management issues. He has close links with the water industry, with which he has been connected ever since privatisation.

He was a co-founder of the business ethics group, the Corporate Social Responsibility Foundation, launched by international development secretary Hilary Benn, MP in [2004]. He has also lectured in journalism in various universities in the UK and US. The ABC network programme, The John Batchelor Show, called him one of Europe's leading spin doctors. Arnold is an expert on disability rights and has worked on many high-profile campaigns for Guide Dogs, the European Guide Dog Federation and the Royal London Society for Blind People - both as a strategist and media spokesman.

== Family ==
Arnold is married with two children and lives in Langley.
