= Ernest Franklin Bozman =

Ernest Franklin Bozman (1895–1968) was a British writer and the editor of two editions of Everyman's Encyclopaedia.

== Works ==
- Mountain Essays (1928)
- X plus Y: a novel (1936)
- The Traveller's Return (1938)
- British Hills and Mountains (1940), with James Horst Brunnerman Bell and John Fairfax-Blakeborough
- Phil Empresson (1944)
- Ressemblance Garantie (1947), with Michel Arnaud, René Lalou & Miron Grindea
- Ghana - Inertial Navigation (1967)
- Infallibility - Lobachevsk (1967)

=== Translations ===
- In Defence of Letters (1939), by Georges Duhamel
- Cry Out of the Depths (1953), by Georges Duhamel
