= British Almanac =

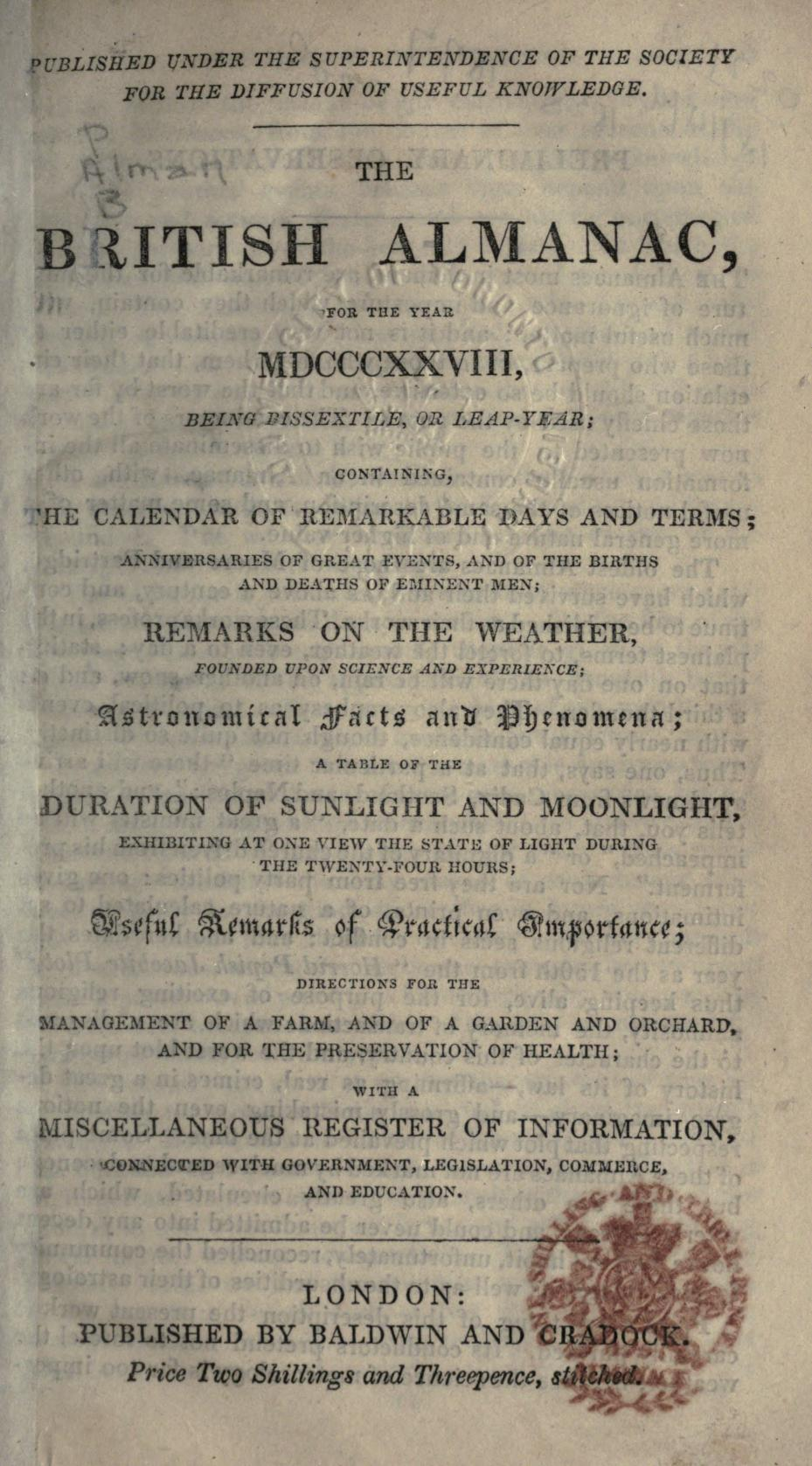
- Cover of the 1828 British Almanac.
- Categories: Almanacs, Weather, Astronomy, Calendar, Gardening, Advice
- Frequency: Annual
- Founded: 1828
- First issue: 1828
- Final issue Number: 1914; 87
- Country: United Kingdom
- Language: English

The British Almanac was an almanac published from 1828 until 1914 in London, United Kingdom by the Society for the Diffusion of Useful Knowledge. For the given year, each volume contained a 'calendar of remarkable days and terms', 'anniversaries of great events, and of the births and deaths of eminent men', 'remarks on the weather', 'astronomical facts and phenomena', 'a table of the duration of sunlight and moonlight', 'useful remarks of practical importance', 'directions for the management of a farm, and of a garden and orchard' and a 'miscellaneous register of information'. It was initially published in London by Baldwin and Cradock.

== Titles ==
The British Almanac was published under several titles:

- 1828: The British Almanac (Published under the superintendence of the Society for the Diffusion of Useful Knowledge)
- 1829–1886: British Almanac of the Society for the Diffusion of Useful Knowledge
- 1887–1888: British Almanac and Companion
- 1889–1896: Unknown
- 1897–1909: British Almanac and Family Cyclopedia
- 1910–1912: British Almanac and Companion
- 1913–1914: British Almanac

== See also ==
- Whitaker's Almanack
