= Penny Cyclopaedia =

Encyclopedia

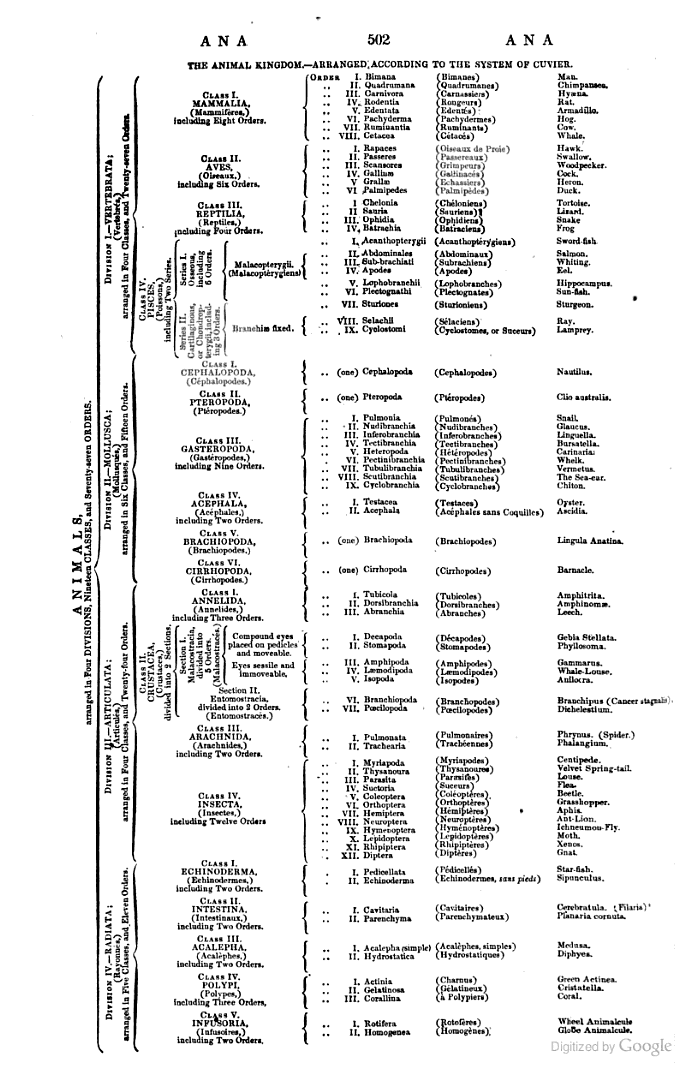
Table of the Animal Kingdom based on Cuvier's Règne Animal in the Penny Cyclopaedia, 1828

The Penny Cyclopædia published by the Society for the Diffusion of Useful Knowledge was a multi-volume encyclopedia edited by George Long and published by Charles Knight alongside the Penny Magazine. Twenty-seven volumes and three supplements were published from 1833 to 1843.

== Editions ==
The Penny Cyclopædia was originally published in 27 thin volumes between 1833 and 1843. Supplements were issued in 1851 and 1858. Despite its name, each individual volume cost 9d. apiece.

== Contributors ==
The contributors to the Penny Cyclopædia were not individually credited with the articles they created, although a list of their names appears in volume 27. The contributors included many notable figures of the period, including the librarian Henry Ellis, the biblical scholar John Kitto, the publisher Charles Knight, the critic George Henry Lewes, the mathematician Augustus De Morgan, the surgeon James Paget, the statistician George Richardson Porter, the sanitary reformer Thomas Southwood Smith, and the art historian Ralph Nicholson Wornum.

== Derivatives ==
A number of mid-to late 19th century encyclopedia were published based on the Penny Cyclopaedia

=== National Cyclopedia of Useful Knowledge ===
The National Cyclopedia of Useful Knowledge was published by Charles Knight in 12 volumes between 1847 and 1851. A second edition in 13 volumes was published between 1856 and 1859 by George Routledge. The work was then sold to the firm of W. Mackenzie who published it as the National Encyclopedia in 14 volumes in 1867, the final volume of which was a world atlas. Further editions of the National Cyclopedia were published in 1875 and in 1884-8. The last was a "revised" edition edited by J. H. F. Brabner.

There was also apparently an American edition of the National Cyclopedia of Useful Knowledge

=== English Cyclopaedia ===
The most famous of the derivatives of the Penny Cyclopaedia was the English Cyclopaedia, which would go on to form the basis of Everyman's Encyclopaedia.

=== Imperial Cyclopedia ===
This was a two volume condensation of the Penny Cyclopaedia specifically regarding the British Empire, published 1850-51.

== Influence ==
The novelist Herman Melville is known to have used the Penny Cyclopædia while writing Moby-Dick (1851) and other novels, and scholar Paul McCarthy has suggested that the encyclopedia's coverage of moral insanity and monomania may have influenced Melville's characters in Moby-Dick and other writings.

== Volumes ==
Vol. 1. A-And—Vol. 2. And-Ath—Vol. 3. Ath-Bas—Vol. 4. Bas-Blo—Vol. 5. Blo-Buf—Vol. 6. Buf-Cha—Vol. 7. Cha-Cop—Vol. 8. Cop-Dio—Vol. 9. Dio-Ern—Vol. 10. Ern-Fru—Vol. 11. Fue-Had—Vol. 12. Had-Int—Vol. 13. Int-Lim—Vol. 14. Lim-Mas—Vol. 15. Mas-Mur—Vol. 16. Murillo—Organ (1840)—Vol. 17. Org-Per—Vol. 18. Per-Pri—Vol. 19. Pri-Ric—Vol. 20. Ric-Sca—Vol. 21. Sca-Sig—Vol. 22. Sig-Ste—Vol. 23. Ste-Tai—Vol. 24. Tai-Tit—Vol. 25. Tit-Ung—Vol. 26. Ung-Wal—Vol. 27. Wal-Zyg
