= Everyman's Encyclopaedia =

British encyclopaedia

cover of 5th edition

Everyman's Encyclopaedia is an encyclopedia published by Joseph Dent from 1913 as part of the Everyman's Library.

The set was descended from the 1850s English Cyclopaedia of 1854, which in turn was based on the Penny Cyclopaedia of the 1830s. Originally published in 1913–14 by J.M. Dent in London and, simultaneously, E. P. Dutton in New York, the encyclopedia proved popular due to its low cost, small size and concise but highly accurate articles. The set did, however, lack much illustrative material. Andrew Boyle was credited as the editor.

A second edition was published in 1931–32. The title was slightly different, changing from The Everyman Encyclopedia to Everyman's Encyclopaedia. This set had 12 volumes, 7 million words, 9,000 pages and 50,000 articles. There was also an optional atlas volume. Athelstan Ridgway was credited as the editor.

The third edition was published in 1950, again under Ridgway's direction, and published in London by Dent, but now in New York by Macmillan Publishers. This change was reflected in the fourth edition, in 1958, that was published as Macmillan's Everyman's Encyclopaedia in the US. The Macmillan's Everyman's Encyclopaedia had 12 volumes, 9 million words and was edited by Ernest Franklin Bozman. Because of its British focus and difficult system of abbreviation it was not recommended for family use, but was considered ideal for schools and libraries.

A fifth edition was published in May 1967. Some of the basic format was similar, with 12 volumes and 8 million words, the text was extensively revised, more illustrations were added and the typeface increased one third in size. In the United States this was published as the International Everyman's Encyclopedia, in 20 volumes with one million words more that its UK counterpart.

The 1978 sixth edition was not sold in the United States because of copyright issues with the illustrations. Specifically the cost of gaining rights to pictures was too high compared to the company's probable return on investment. It was however, distributed in Canada by Fitzhenry & Whiteside. This edition had 12 volumes, 8,896 pages, 51,000 articles, and 9 million words. 5,000 black and white illustrations, 600 maps and a 64-page color atlas in the final volume. Articles were of the specific entry type, averaging 200 words or a fifth of a page, and were all unsigned. 400 contributors and editors were "noted", however. There were 15,000 cross-references, but no index. As of 1994 the publishers had stated that there were no plans to produce a new print edition of the encyclopedia.

By 1986 Everyman's Encyclopaedia was available online through Dialog Information Services of Palo Alto, California. As of 1994 the Everyman's Encyclopaedia was still available on Dialog, but only as the unrevised 1978 sixth edition.

== Editions ==
1. 1913–1914: ed. Andrew Boyle, 12 vols., boxed. (London and New York: E.P. Dutton & co.) OCLC 4863695
  Boyle, Andrew (1913–1914). The Everyman Encyclopaedia. London: J. M. Dent and New York: E.P. Dutton & Co. – via archive.org.
2. 1931–1932: ed. Athelstan Ridgway; Eric John Holmyard OCLC 29825201. 12 volumes + atlas in red cloth. 7,000,000 words & 2000 illustrations. Extensive coverage of WW1. Atlas had 224 pages of maps & 170-page 35,000-entry index.
3. 1949–1951: ed. Athelstan Ridgway OCLC 67542127. 12 volumes in dark blue cloth. 8,500,000 words; 50,000 articles; 2500 illustrations. Extensive coverage of WW2 in articles totalling 250,000 words.
4. 1958–1959: ed. Ernest Franklin Bozman OCLC 7097798. 12 volumes in teal cloth. 9,000,000 words; 50,000 articles; 2500 illustrations. WW1 and WW2 coverage significantly condensed to make room for science, technology and political updates.
5. 1967–1968, reprint 1972: ed. Ernest Franklin Bozman, twelve volumes OCLC 19518, 222655867
6. 1978: David A. Girling, twelve volumes. ISBN 0-460-04098-7; OCLC 4897237

In North America it was published as:

- Macmillan Everyman's Encyclopedia (fourth edition, 1958) OCLC 1597392
- International Everyman's Encyclopedia (fifth edition, 1967)

A 1986 edition called The New Illustrated Everyman's Encyclopaedia, edited by John Paxton, was published by Octopus Books, ISBN 0-7064-2565-0.

In 1932 a Canadian edition was published by the Cambridge Society of Montreal. Titled the Cambridge Encyclopedia this was mostly a reprint of the 1931 edition, with the 12 volumes of text and an atlas making up the 13th volume. Some color illustration plates were added to each volume and a maple leaf was added to the binding. Despite these cosmetic changes the set was sold in Canada for twice what it was in the US. This apparently tarnished the encyclopedia's reputation somewhat.
