= Harriet Ludlow Clarke =

English wood engraver and stained-glass artist

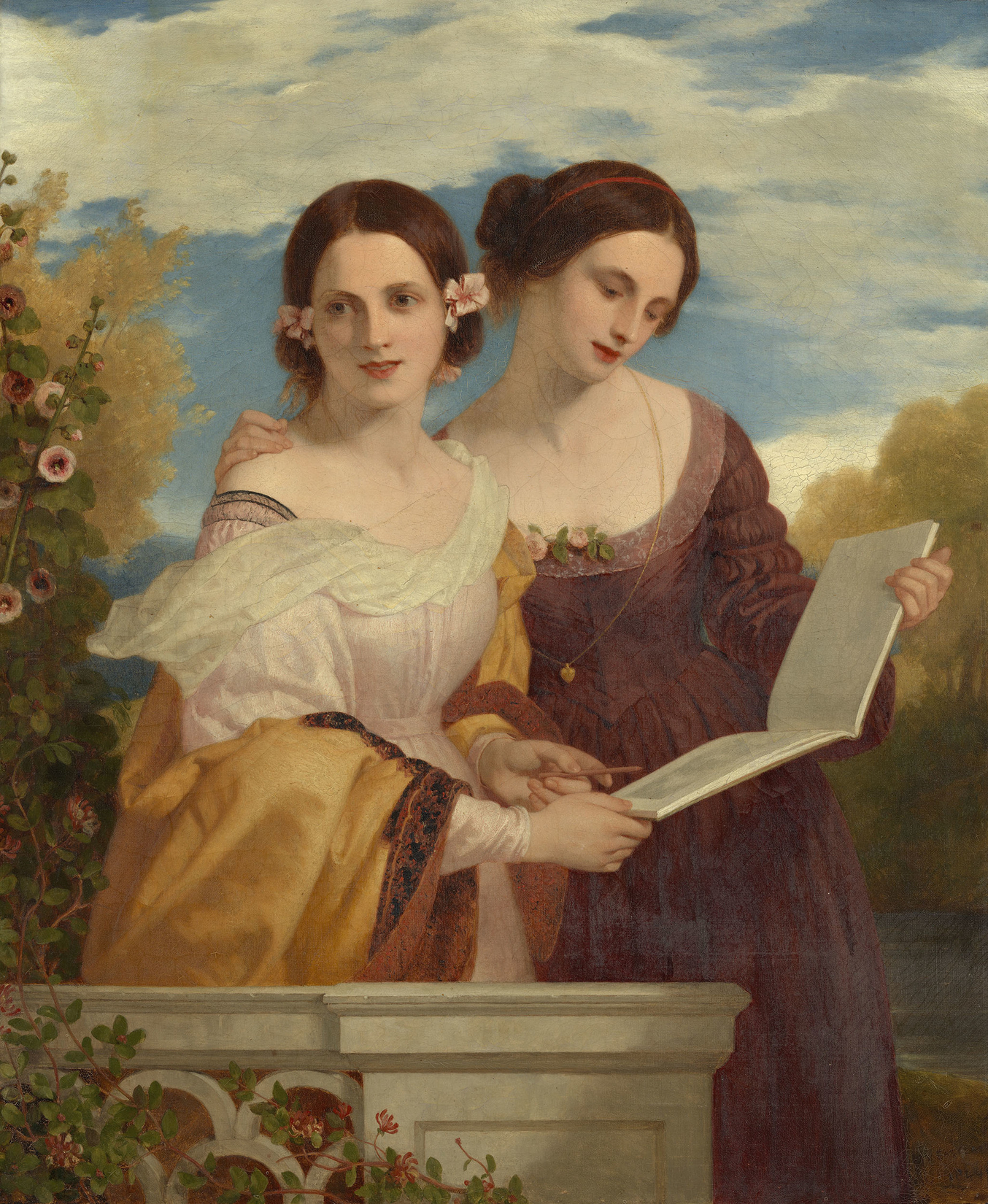
- The Sisters by Charles Lock Eastlake
- Born: United Kingdom of Great Britain and Ireland
- Died: 19 January 1866; Cannes, France
- Known for: Engraving; Stained glass

Harriet Ludlow Clarke (died 19 January 1866) was an English wood engraver and stained-glass artist.

== Life ==
Harriet Ludlow Clarke was the fourth daughter of Edward Clarke, a London solicitor. Around 1837, she started trying to earn a living as a wood engraver, which was then unusual for a woman. Attracting the notice of the engraver William Harvey, she executed a large cut from his design for the Penny Magazine in 1838. With Harvey's support, Clarke earned a good deal of money, which she used to build model labourers' homes at Cheshunt. A friend of Anna Jameson, she contributed some of the illustrations to Jameson's Sacred and Legendary Art, as well as making engravings of classic paintings for The Art Journal.

In 1841, she and her sister Elizabeth (wife to the legal reformer Charles Henry Bellenden Ker) were depicted sketching from a balcony in a popular oil painting by Charles Eastlake.

Clarke also became a designer and painter on glass, studying at home and abroad to master the techniques, and helped by the leading stained-glass painter William Wailes. In about 1851, she executed a window, showing Saint Martin sharing his cloak with a beggar, in St Martin's Church, Canterbury, which was being restored by the Hon. Daniel Finch. From 1852 to 1854, she was commissioned by Henry Berens to paint two windows for the new church at Sidcup, and on Berens's death executed a further window erected by subscription to his memory. She executed for the queen a large window in the church of North Marston, to commemorate a bequest to her majesty by Mr. Neald of an estate in that parish. The Rev. Robert Moore employed her to execute a large window in the north-west transept of Canterbury Cathedral, representing the history of Thomas à Becket. Though she prepared full-sized colour cartoons for this, failing health prevented her from executing her designs on glass: the windows were put up in May 1863 by Mr Hughes of Frith Street, Soho. From this point onwards, ill-health stopped Clarke's activity as an artist. There is another small memorial window by her in St Martin's Church, Canterbury.
