= William Barnard Clarke (physician) =

English physician, naturalist and museum curator

William Barnard Clarke (1807–1894), was an English physician, naturalist and museum curator, who collaborated with Professor John Stevens Henslow in the formation of Ipswich Museum in 1847–1850, the first Museum founded with a specific mission for the scientific education of the working classes. He is not to be confused with his contemporary, the Suffolk-born geologist William Branwhite Clarke.

== Ipswich origins ==
Clarke's grandfather, Peter Clarke (1722–1804), attorney, was town clerk of Ipswich in 1750–55 and 1767–79, and several times one of the two bailiffs (heads of the Borough's governance). Attached to the nonconformist meeting in Tacket Street, he married Anne Barnard (of the notable Ipswich shipwright family) in 1754, and his son William Barnard Clarke the elder was christened in 1756.

The elder William, father of the curator, was articled clerk in 1773 and, following the calling of an attorney, became a senior portman (a civic role equivalent to alderman). In 1804 he married Susan, daughter of John Conder and Deborah Barnard of Ipswich (and widow of William Lloyd), and they had a family of three sons, William Barnard, Henry and Edward, and three daughters, Susan, Fanny and Anne. William was a principal sponsor of the new Provision Market in Ipswich in 1811. In 1815 he was appointed a Gentleman Usher Quarterly Waiter in Ordinary to the monarch, and in that year read an address to H.R.H. the Prince Regent at Sudbourne Hall. Serving as a Bailiff of the Borough in 1820, and its treasurer in 1821–1823, William the elder kept his position at Court until his death, which occurred at Ipswich in 1833.

== Education and family ==
The Curator, William Barnard Clarke the younger, having received certificates of honour in Anatomy, Physiology, Materia medica and Practical Anatomy from the University of London in the session of 1829–30, obtained his M.D. from the University of Edinburgh in 1835, presenting a Thesis On the Vital Principle in Animals and Vegetables. He married Maria Jennings in Ipswich in 1834, and practised as a physician in Suffolk and Essex. His sister Frances (Fanny) married Dr Henry Pilkington Drummond, of Silent Street, Ipswich: his brother Dr. Edward Clarke, also a medical student, produced architectural drawings for the papers of the short-lived Suffolk Archaeological Association.

A heraldic bookplate of c. 1835 for W.B. Clarke, M.D., shows in the dexter party per pale the arms attributed by Burke to Clarke of Henstead and Bungay, as shown by Suckling: "argent on a bend gules between three torteaux as many swans proper", and Crest, "a swan proper"; with the motto "Animo venustateque delecto". The arms may be presumptive, but the bookplate is correctly attributed to Dr Clarke of Ipswich: Clarke is impaled with Jennings, "Argent a lion rampant gules holding in the paws a battle-axe proper on a chief azure three ducal coronets or", arms of the King's Procurator-General in the Cape Colony and Proctor in the High Court of Admiralty, William David Jennings, and of his father David Jennings, Esq., of Dublin, from whom Mrs Clarke was no doubt descended.

The Clarke family home was a large two-storey house ("Shakespeare House") fronting on Falcon Street in central Ipswich, its garden containing a pool with golden carp and a large conservatory. The family life is described by Henry Button (born 1829, son of Clarke's half-sister Harriet, née Lloyd), who lived in the household as a child after his parents and brethren emigrated to Launceston, Tasmania in 1833, until joining them in 1837. Henry was taught to read by his aunts, and joined his uncle William (who carried a percussion fowling-piece or a "gunstick") on country excursions up and down the rivers Orwell and Gipping in search of natural history specimens for taxidermy.

Henry Button described a respectable but kindly, bible-reading home, with servants, under the elder figure of his grandmother Mrs Susan Clarke. The Clarkes attended the Anglican St Nicholas church, but one of Henry's aunts attended the Congregational church daily. He recalled William reading aloud the Travels of Mungo Park and The Last of the Mohicans as his sisters did their needlework. William and Edward were both studying medicine, and there were gifts and tearful farewells when Henry went to join his parents in 1837.

== Curator ==
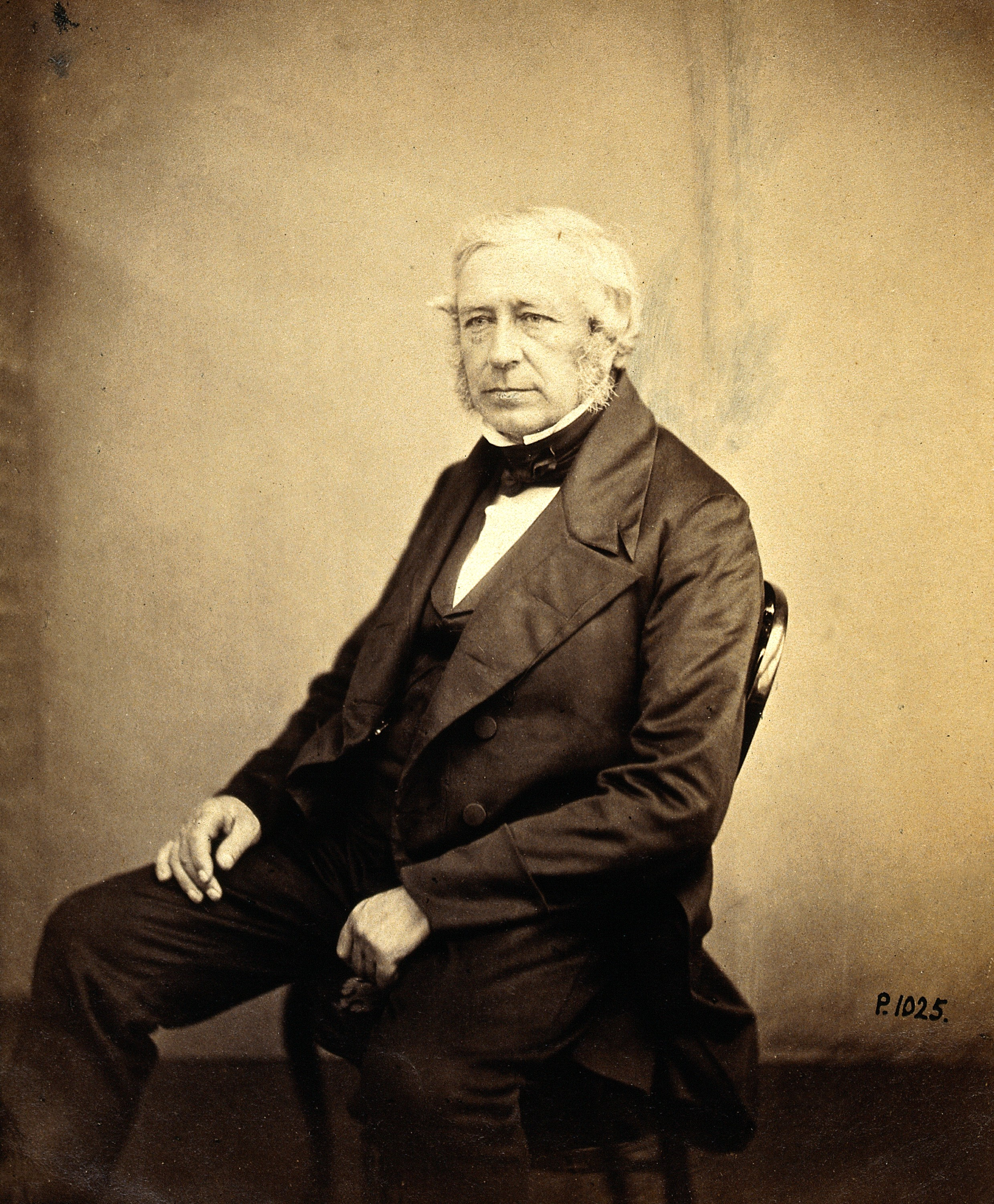
Professor Henslow

In 1837 Dr. Clarke contributed an article to the Magazine of Natural History describing his discovery of an Argentine (a fish then seldom recorded in British waters) at Portobello on the Firth of Forth in April 1833. The editor, Edward Charlesworth, obtained a comment from William Yarrell, later one of the scientists very active in the first years of the Ipswich Museum. In 1838 Clarke published observations on the European nightjar, derived from investigations near Ipswich in 1832. Clarke's observation (made in 1839) that the red-legged partridge had been introduced as game by the Marquess of Hertford and Lord Rendlesham into the Sudbourne Hall and Rendlesham Hall estates around 1770 earned a particular mention in Yarrell's History of British Birds. In 1840 he offered a descriptive sketch of the flora of the Ipswich neighbourhood, together with a short piece on the behaviour of water shrews.

With a strong interest in natural history, William Barnard Clarke lectured to meetings of the Ipswich Philosophical Society (The Ipswich Scientific Book Club) – a self-electing group of townsmen (including Charlesworth) who met regularly to hear and deliver papers on scientific and technical subjects from its membership – during the 1840s, and formed a collection of specimens.

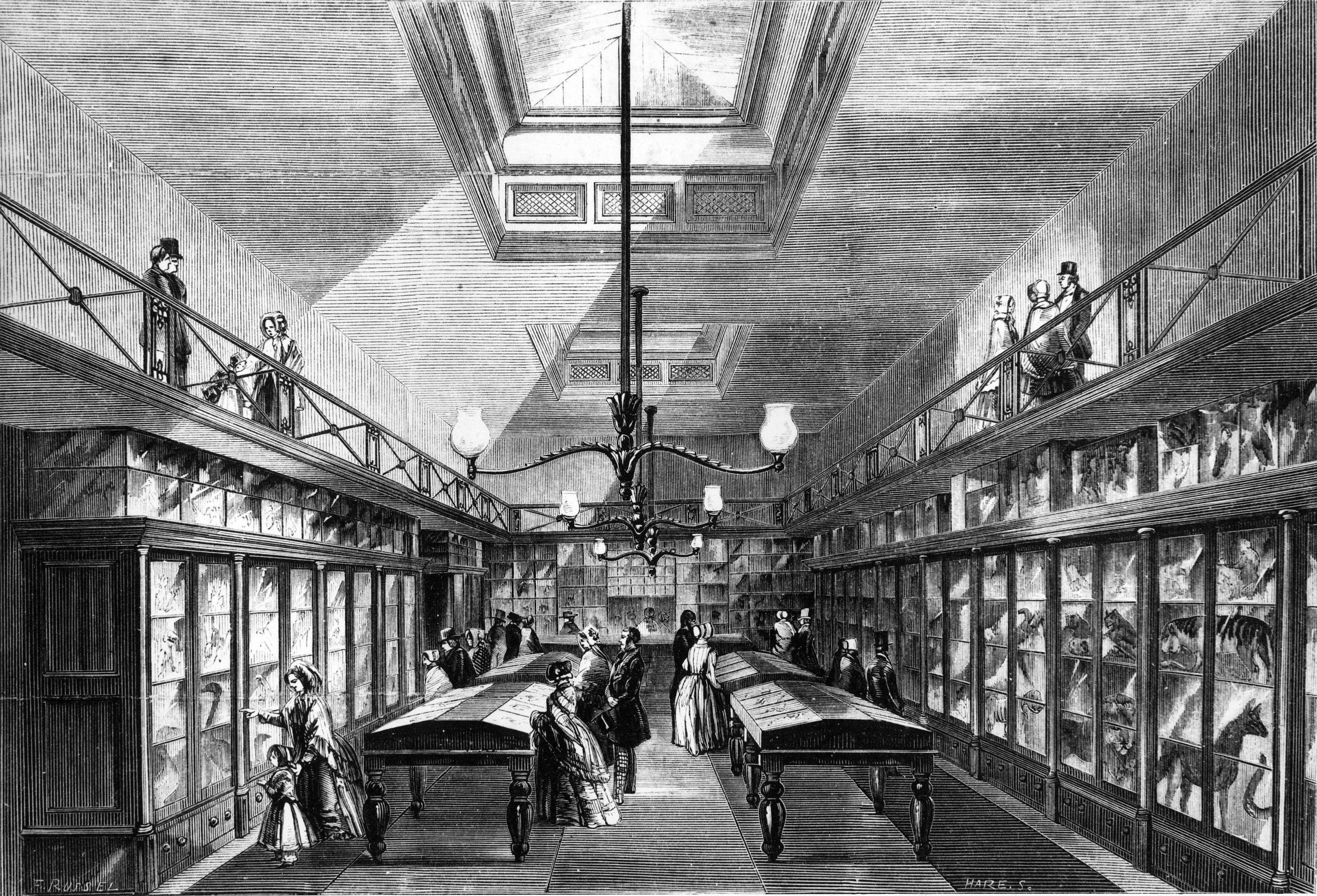
Ipswich Museum in around 1850

The promoters of the Ipswich Museum, which was founded and built in 1846–47, had given comparatively little thought to the choice of a Curator until shortly before the opening, all being preoccupied with their own important roles. (Charlesworth had by then migrated to the Yorkshire Museum.) As it progressed, through the concerted energies of the Quaker Alexander and Ransome families, and under the direct scientific guidance of Professor Henslow (Charles Darwin's friend and mentor), Clarke was rather belatedly invited to be its first Curator.

Clarke served in the stipendiary office of Curator during the founding Presidency of the very elderly William Kirby, one of the fathers of entomology. Kirby's role was essentially honorific, but Clarke worked alongside Henslow in the early formation and arrangement of the collections, and in the routine lecturing and exposition to groups of the working classes for whose benefit the Museum was overtly founded. With his assistant William Bilson he was also responsible for taxidermy of many specimens, and had the somewhat disagreeable task of stuffing the carcass of a lion named "Wallace" (obtained from Wombwell's Menagerie) during a hot summer.

In 1847 Clarke published the record of seal not previously found in Britain. In 1849 he published on a species of zoophyte discovered in the New Dock at Ipswich (with illustrations by his co-author engraved on wood by Edward Clarke), and also reported on a bottlenose dolphin lately found at Bawdsey, which had been sent to him at the Museum.

Wreck of the "Favorite"

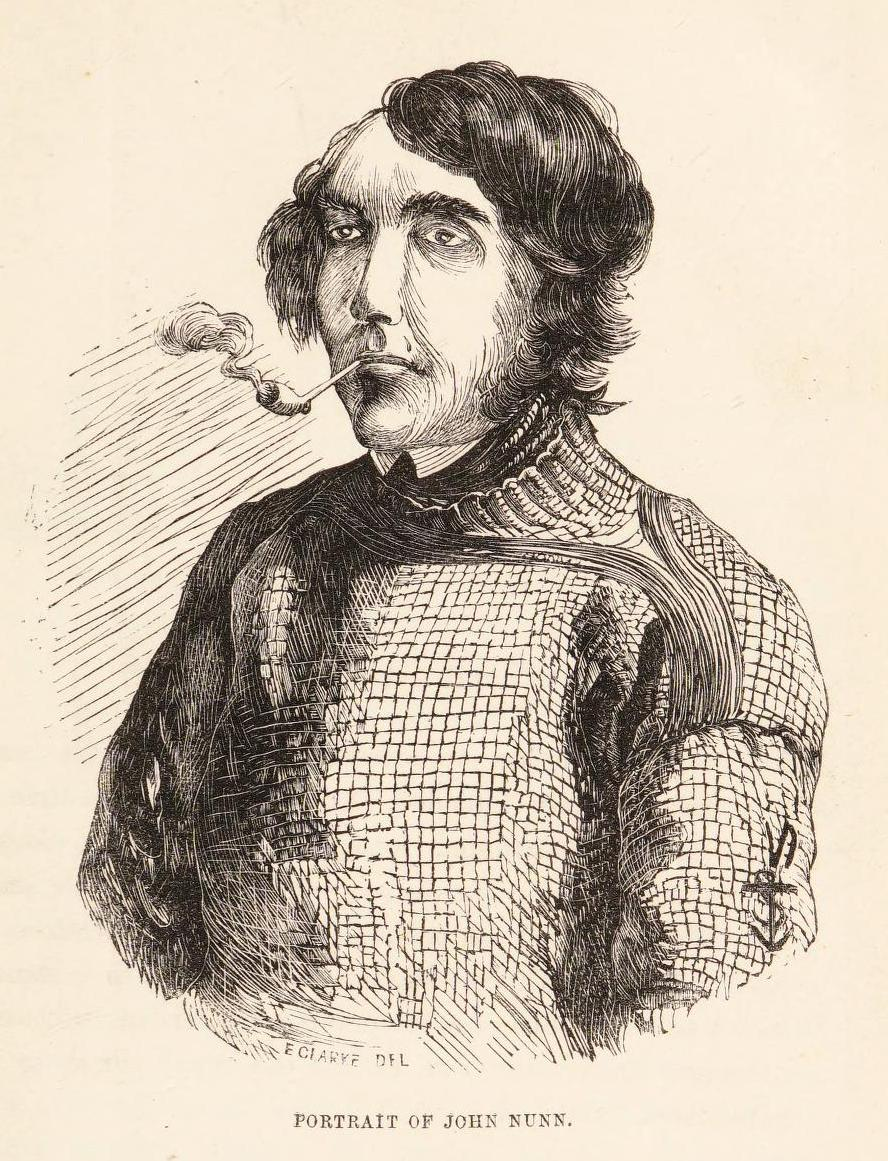
John Nunn of Ipswich, drawn by Dr Edward Clarke c. 1849

It was during a dredging expedition on the river Orwell, on behalf of the Museum, that he met with a sailor named Nunn who, being engaged in the whale fisheries during the 1820s, had had the interesting misfortune to be marooned on the remote Southern Ocean archipelago of the Kerguelen Islands for three years. Recognizing the scientific importance of a first-hand testimony of this comparatively unknown place, Clarke took down his story at length and raised an advance subscription from among the many patrons and sponsors of the early Museum. His edited version of Nunn's account, told in the first person, was interspersed with scientific information from other sources to form a book in the "Wreck Narrative" genre, entitled Narrative of the Wreck of the "Favorite" on the Island of Desolation (1850).

This he dedicated to Professor Henslow "as an attempt to follow his excellent example", and was sold for the benefit of Mr Nunn (who had lost the use of his right hand) and his young family. It was illustrated by his brother Dr Edward Clarke. The passages relating to the whale and seal fisheries of Kerguelen chimed in particularly well with Henslow's preoccupation with the industrial and economic benefits to be gained from a more widespread knowledge of natural history and its economic possibilities. It was also a useful contribution to popular understanding of global political geography, in accord with the Museum's wide-reaching connections with scientific voyages of exploration in that period.

Trials of a curator

Although his tenure as Curator was fairly brief, Clarke's work was undoubtedly formative in the creation of Henslow's public museum at Ipswich. Being the senior "academic" figure normally in attendance at the Museum, he was, on the one hand, closely involved in the formal occasions and visits of the many leading scientists numbered among the Museum's Honorary Vice-Presidents, and on the other hand was at the front line of the Museum's pioneering mission to bring scientific knowledge to the working people.

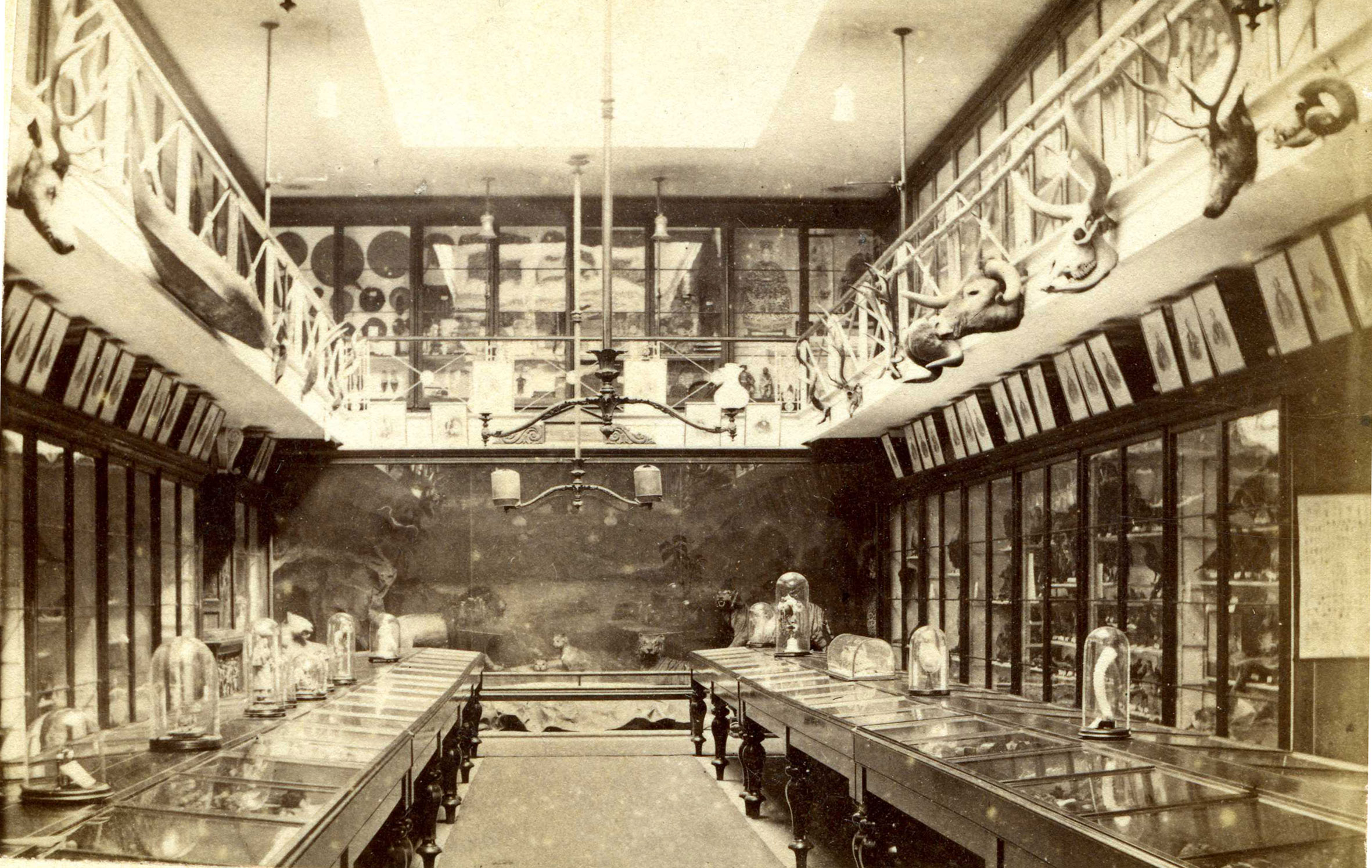
The Museum Room during the 1870s

Clarke's tenure as curator was marked by hostile public interactions. He was taunted by local youths who threw lighted squibs outside his office door, urinated in the Museum doorway, banged the cases underneath to make specimens fall off their stands, and spat fruit pips from the balcony onto the polished glass table-cases beneath. Furthermore, he became morally outraged by the conviction that the free evening public lectures in the Museum were being used by disreputable persons to make informal sexual advances. His protests to the committee led to a standoff (the promoters not wishing their project to fail) and he resigned angrily in 1850 with a recriminatory correspondence in the Ipswich press.

Aftermath

At this point Professor Henslow became the museum's president, and took an increasingly active personal role in its work. In 1851 Dr. Clarke contributed an article on the Suffolk Crags (i.e. Red Crag and Coralline Crag) to the Magazine of Natural History. He considered that Henslow had made insufficient acknowledgement of his part in identifying the deposit in which the phosphatic nodules of the Crags – the foundation of the Coprolite industry – had been recognized at Felixstowe. Charles Darwin, who had borrowed J.D. Hooker's copy of the Wreck of the "Favorite", wrote to Henslow in November 1854 asking him to find out from Dr. Clarke whether John Nunn could say what sorts of driftwood were found in Kerguelen. The reply, if any, is not recorded. Dr. Clarke returned to his medical career. In 1854 his brother Dr Edward Clarke emigrated to Launceston, Tasmania, as medical officer aboard the City of Hobart, a voyage which he described in a Journal with a letter of address to his brother. Edward spent his last years in Melbourne, Australia.

== Later life ==
Both William and his brother Henry had sons named William Barnard Clarke. In later life he was widowed, and around 1870 removed to Henry's home at Tynemouth, settling soon after at Fairy Wood Cottage at Nostell, Yorkshire (Census, 1871–1891), where he died in 1894.
