= Brabner =

Brabner is a surname. Notable people with the surname include:

- Joyce Brabner (1952–2024), American writer of political comics
- Rupert Brabner (1911–1945), British politician and war pilot
