= Society for the Diffusion of Useful Knowledge =

1826–1846 British organization

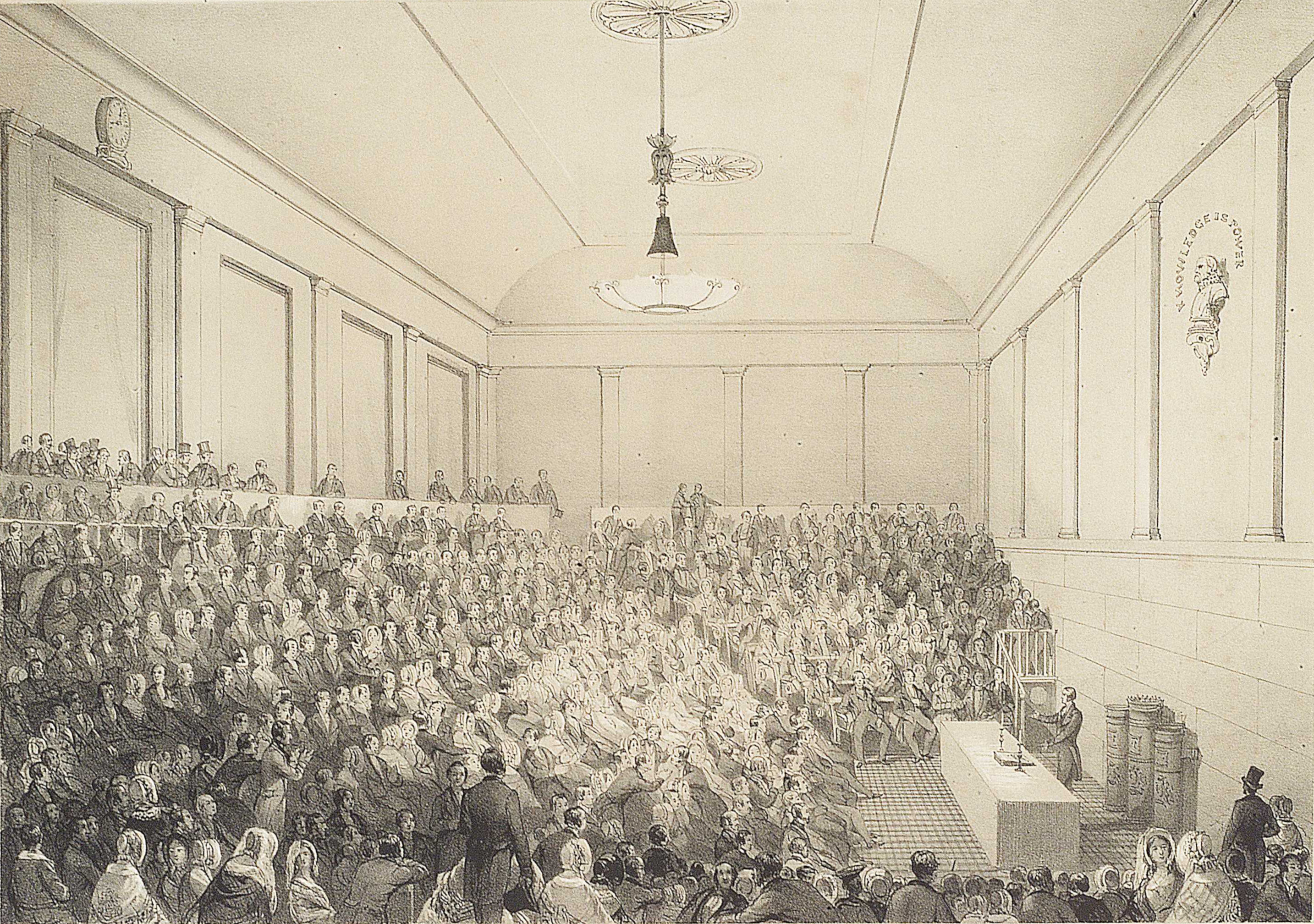
- The Society's lecture-hall at its opening in 1843
- Founded: 1826
- Founder: Lord Brougham
- Dissolved: 1846
- Headquarters: London
- Publication: Penny Cyclopaedia, Penny Magazine, Library of Useful Knowledge

The Society for the Diffusion of Useful Knowledge (SDUK) was founded in London in 1826, mainly at the instigation of Whig MP Henry Brougham, with the object of publishing information to people who were unable to obtain a formal education or who preferred self-education. It was a largely Whig organisation, and published inexpensive texts intended to adapt scientific and similarly high-minded material for the rapidly-expanding reading public over twenty years until it was disbanded in 1846.

== Origins ==
Henry Brougham considered that mass education was an essential prerequisite for political reform. In October 1824 he contributed an article on "scientific education of the people" to the Whig Edinburgh Review, in which he argued that popular education would be greatly enhanced by the encouragement of cheap publications to complement the numerous recently founded provincial mechanics' institutes. The following year a version of this article was issued as a pamphlet entitled Practical Observations upon the Education of the People Addressed to the Working Classes and Their Employers, selling at least 19 editions. In April 1825 Brougham set about trying to found a society to produce cheap educational books, although it was not until November 1826 that the SDUK was formally founded.

One of those present at the first meeting was the philosopher James Mill, and the founding committee included many Fellows of the Royal Society and Members of Parliament, as well as twelve founding committee members of the newly formed University College London.

== Aims ==
SDUK publications were intended for the working class and the middle class, as an antidote to the more radical output of the pauper presses. The Society set out to achieve this by acting as an intermediary between authors and publishers by launching several series of publications. Its printers included Baldwin & Cradock, later succeeded by Charles Knight. The SDUK commissioned work and dealt with the printers, and finally distributed the publications; profits were used to continue the Society's work. By using the new technologies of mass production, such as steam presses and stereotype, the Society and its printers kept costs low and were able to sell the books at much cheaper prices than was usual. The Society's publications also included maps, engravings, and diagrams. The Society had three main phrases summarising their aims: "Knowledge is Power", "Knowledge is Virtue", and "Happiness and Power". In order to avoid too much discussion and debate, religious and political topics were not covered.

The Society was not without opposition, and the Literary Gazette mounted a campaign on behalf of the book trade, supported by publications such as the Royal Lady's Magazine, who complained in the early 1830s that:

Few persons are aware that the Society for the Diffusion of Useful Knowledge have done, and are still doing, more to ruin the Book trade than all the change of times, the want of money, the weight of taxes, and even the law of Libel have accomplished; yet they – a committee of Noblemen and pretended Patriots – are permitted to go on in their unfeeling, nay, considering the hundreds of thousands engaged in the Book trade, we may add brutal, career, without interruption.

== Activities ==
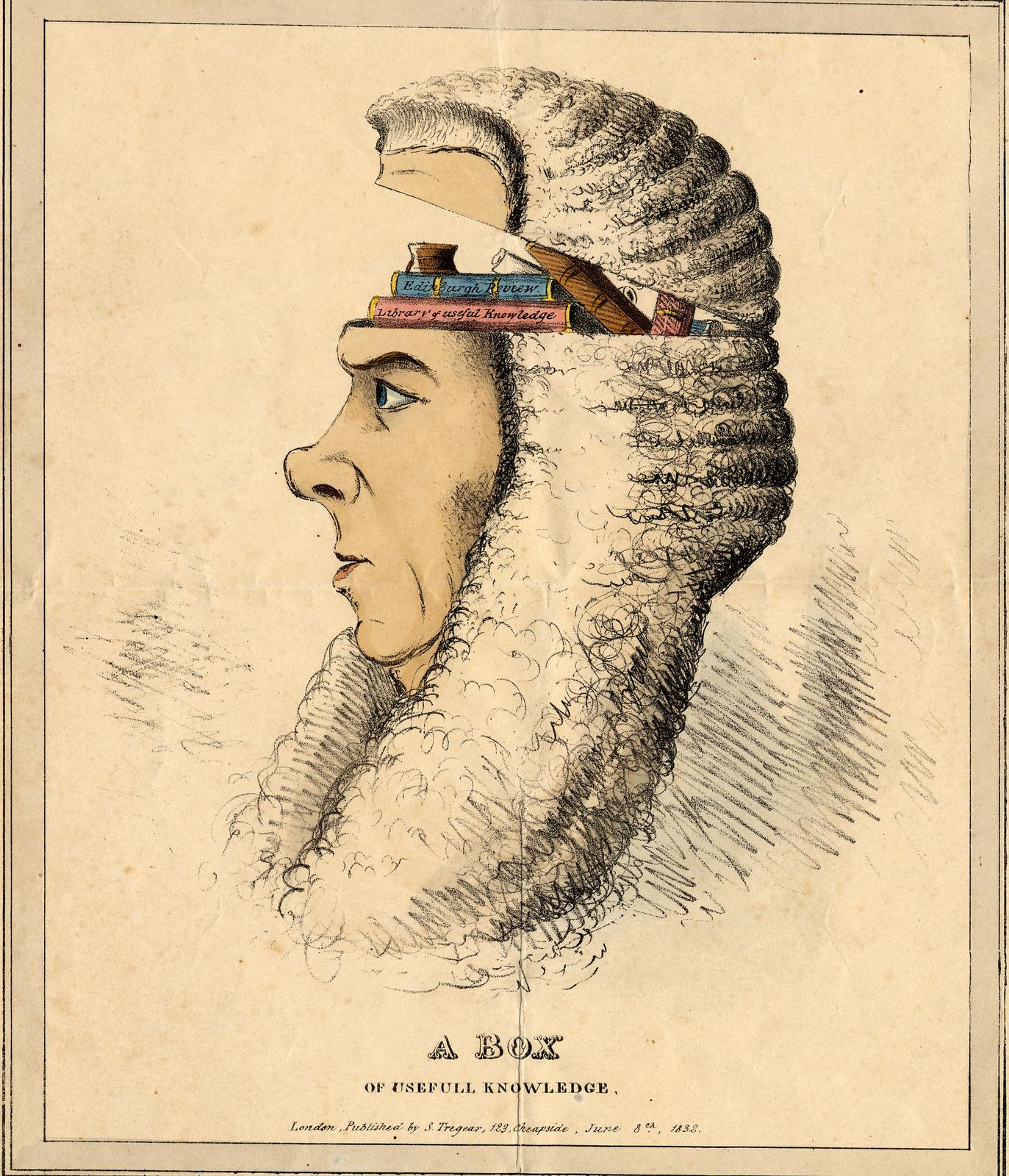
"A Box of Useful Knowledge" (1832), artist unknown. The image portrays Brougham as Lord Chancellor, with SDUK and other publications inside.

The SDUK publishing programme began with the Library of Useful Knowledge. Sold for sixpence and published fortnightly, its books focused on scientific topics. Like many other works in the new genre of popular science—such as the Bridgewater Treatises and Humphry Davy's Consolations in Travel—the books of the Library of Useful Knowledge imbued different scientific fields with concepts of progress: uniformitarianism in geology, the nebular hypothesis in astronomy, and the scala naturae in the life sciences. According to historian James A. Secord, such works met a demand for "general concepts and simple laws", and in the process helped establish the authority of professional science and specialised scientific disciplines.

The first volume of the Library of Useful Knowledge, an introduction to the series by Brougham on the "objects, advantages and pleasures of science", sold over 33,000 copies by the end of 1829. Despite the initial success of the series, however, it soon became clear that it was too demanding for many readers, and the Society began to offer more varied and attractive publications, starting with the Library of Entertaining Knowledge (1829–38) and the Penny Magazine (1832–1845), a lavishly illustrated weekly that achieved unprecedented success, with sales in excess of 200,000 copies in the first year. The scope and scale of the Society's activities expanded further over the following decade, and included the production of a Penny Cyclopaedia (1833–1843) in 27 volumes.

Although sales of these publications may have been more among the middle- than the working-classes, the Society had a significant role in pioneering "the idea of cheap, improving publications, freely and easily available, well produced and distributed on a scale hitherto unknown," and became iconic of the "March of Intellect". The publisher Charles Knight bears much of the credit for the success that SDUK publications had; he engaged in extensive promotional campaigns, and worked to improve the readability of the sometimes abstruse material.

The Society's continuing commitment to the high intellectual standards with which it was conceived probably contributed to its ultimate decline, as subscribers and sale of publications fell away. The Biographical Dictionary begun in 1842 was immensely ambitious and contributed to the Society's demise.

== Main publication series ==
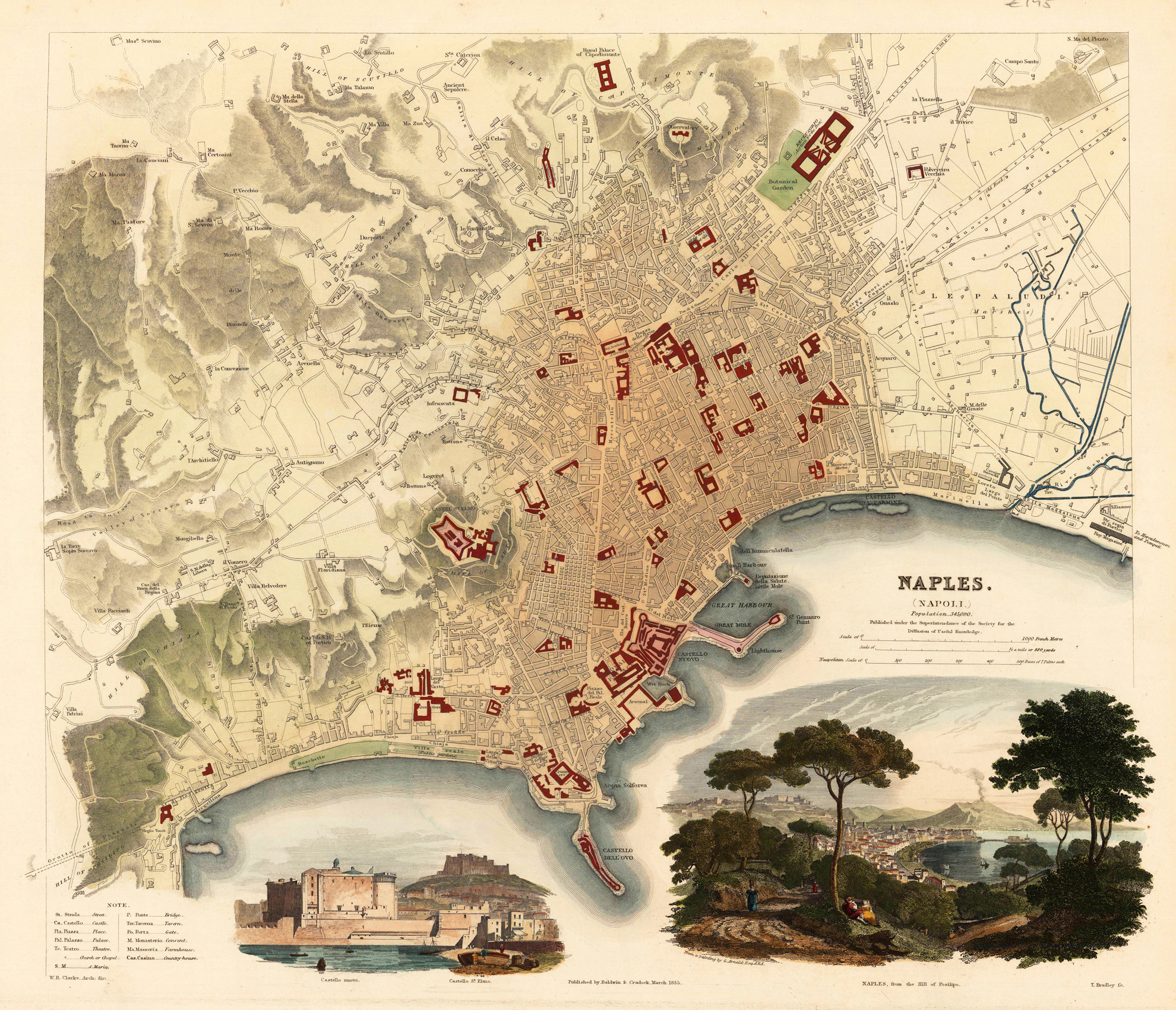
Map of Naples published by SDUK

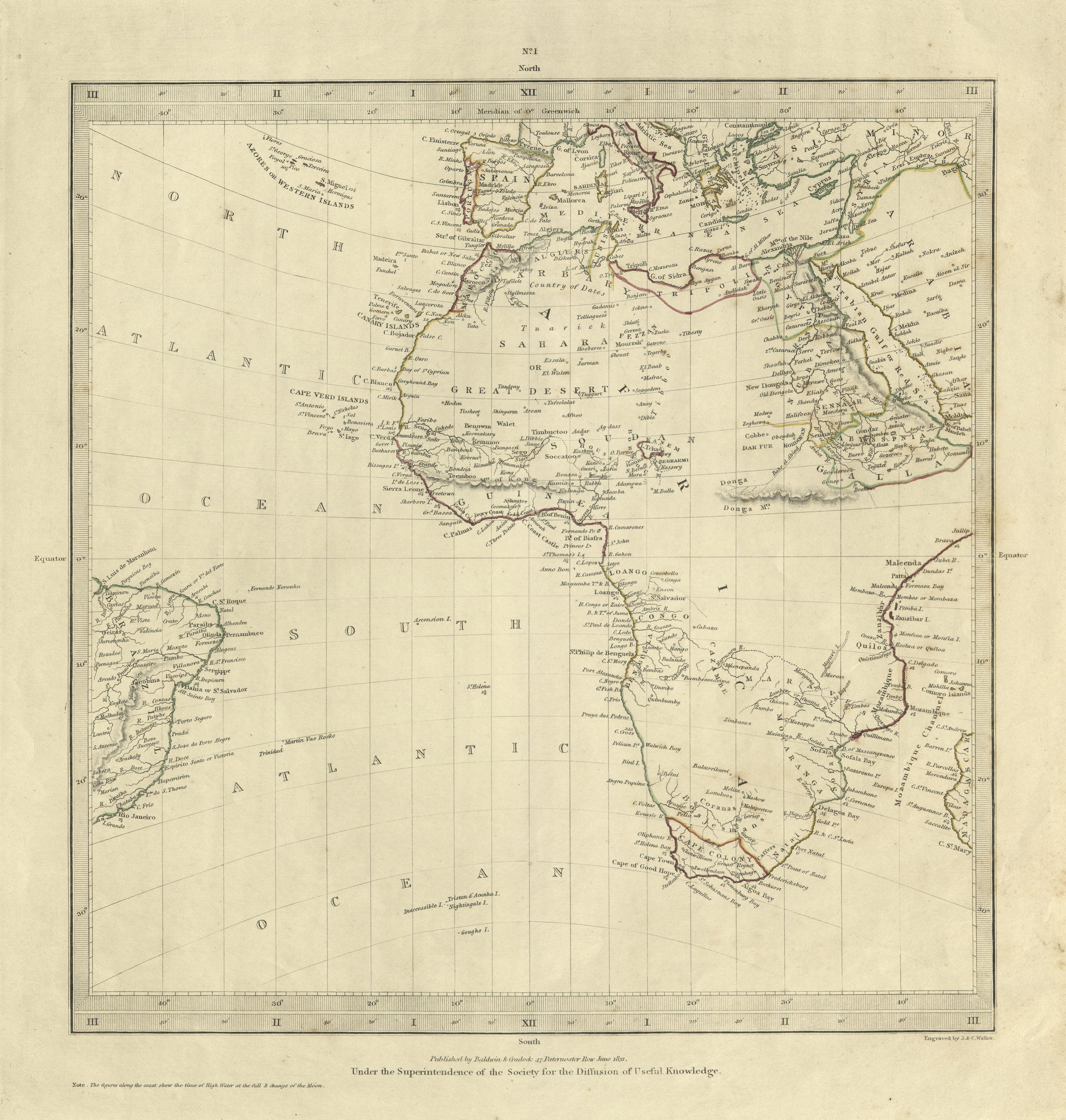
Map of Africa published by SDUK

- Library of Useful Knowledge (1827–1846)
- British Almanac (1828–1914; and associated Companion)
- Library of Entertaining Knowledge (1829–1838)
- Working Man's Companion (1831–1832)
- Quarterly Journal of Education (1831–1835)
- Penny Magazine (1832–1845)
- Gallery of Portraits (1832–1834)
- Penny Cyclopaedia (1833–1843)
- Library for the Young (1834–1840)
- Farmers Series, which included works by William Youatt on the dog, the horse, cattle, and sheep (1834–1837)
- Biographical Dictionary (1842–1844)
- Maps, primarily in a two-volume set, and prepared to a very high standard (many drawn by W.B. Clarke, architect). The Society was a pioneer in utilising "volunteered geographic information".

== In popular culture ==
- Thomas Love Peacock satirised the SDUK in 1831 in Crotchet Castle as the 'Steam Intellect Society': a vicarage is almost set on fire by a "cook taking it into her head to study hydrostatics, in a sixpenny tract, published by the Steam Intellect Society".
- In the Notes to Anthony Trollope's book, Framley Parsonage, published by Oxford University Press as a World's Classic in 1980, P. D. Edwards writes that Trollope's character, Lord Boanerges, "may have been modelled in some respects on Lord Brougham.... founder of the Society for the Diffusion of Useful Knowledge".
- References to the Society are rare in the modern era, but within Steampunk culture, it is not entirely uncommon to refer to the Society itself and/or its better-known publications in an attempt to lend Victorian verisimilitude. The in-house publishing organ of the Museum of Jurassic Technology in Los Angeles is called the Society for the Diffusion of Useful Information; while many communities in North America have established Societies for Learning in Retirement which are partially modelled along the same lines with the goal of disseminating knowledge amongst people who, although retired, are still interested in continuing to learn.
- The Blackwood Gallery, a contemporary art gallery at the University of Toronto Mississauga, has published a series of free print and PDF broadsheets since 2018, which adopt the SDUK moniker. These publications reflect on contemporary issues in the arts, humanities, and social sciences by questioning the nature of “useful knowledge,” in dialogue with the history of the SDUK.

== Related societies ==
An independent Boston Society for the Diffusion of Useful Knowledge was founded as part of the Lyceum movement in the United States in 1829. It sponsored lectures by such speakers as Ralph Waldo Emerson and was active from 1829 to 1947. Later, an independent American Society for the Diffusion of Useful Knowledge was founded, which published a fifty-volume set of books called The American School Library. Henry David Thoreau cites the Society in his essay "Walking" in which he jestingly proposes a Society for the Diffusion of Useful Ignorance.

== Collections ==
The archives of the Society are held by University College London (UCL) having been deposited by the Society after it closed in 1848. The archive spans 200 volumes and 121 boxes. It includes minutes, financial records, unpublished manuscripts, and correspondence. Around 250 books and periodicials from the Society are also held at UCL, comprising titles published by the organisation.

University College London also holds the papers of the Society's founder, Henry Brougham. The papers consist primarily of Brougham's incoming correspondence, totalling around 50,000 items, and material relating to his legal and political career.
