= The Penny Magazine =

British magazine

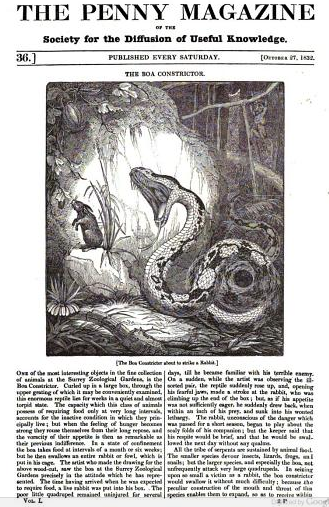
Issue for October 27, 1832

The Penny Magazine was an illustrated British magazine aimed at the working class, published every Saturday from 31 March 1832 to 31 December 1845. It continued as Knight's Penny Magazine until June 1846. Charles Knight created it for the Society for the Diffusion of Useful Knowledge in response to Chambers's Edinburgh Journal, which started two months earlier. Sold for only a penny and illustrated with wood-engravings, it was an expensive enterprise that could survive only with a large circulation. Though initially successful, with a circulation of 200,000 in the first year, it proved too dry and too Whiggish to appeal to its intended working-class audience. The Edinburgh Journal, by contrast, which included a weekly short story, grew more slowly, but lasted longer.

== Early success ==
During the first few years of publication, The Penny Magazine succeeded in building an audience, selling over 200,000 copies in 1832 with an estimated readership of nearly one million that year, easily outselling other periodicals such as the Edinburgh Journal and The Saturday Magazine.

=== Price ===
Several factors contributed to the early success of The Penny Magazine. First, its price of 1d. made it affordable for its intended working-class audience. Its only direct competitor in this price range in 1832 was the Edinburgh Journal.

=== Use of non-radical information ===
Another aspect of its success as suggested by historians Rosemary Mitchell and A.L. Austin was the role of ‘non-radical information’. Austin states that the timing of the publication of the periodical in the same year as the Reform Act 1832 was significant as this meant that "the working classes expected parliamentary authority to consider the laboring community's complaints" and that such questioning of authority led to a "public shift toward rational inquiry" which could be found within the pages of The Penny Magazine. This outlook has been supported by Mitchell who also feels that the lack of controversial material was significant "in the Penny Magazine's appeal to a mass audience."

=== Illustrations ===
An additional factor in the early success of the magazine was the consistent use of illustrations throughout its years of publication. The publisher Charles Knight favoured using the new reproductive medium of wood-engraving, which was cheaper and speedier than the steel-engraving alternative, to attract readers to his publication. Knight also had an advantage, due to being based inside London, he had access to a number of skilled engravers such as William Harvey, John Orrin Smith and Edmund Evans among others. It was through his association with inventor Edward Cowper, as well as the timing of the Industrial Revolution, that enabled him to take advantage of the steam printing press to produce more illustrations for The Penny Magazine.

The use of pictures was also advantageous with the magazine’s target market as over 75% of school children were illiterate and another 300,000 did not attend school in 1832, the first year of publication. Similarly, in 1841 over 30% of males and nearly 50% of females were still illiterate, therefore using illustrations Knight was able to appeal to an audience with limited reading skills, while also enabling self-education.

The illustrations became highly popular with Knight’s target audience as shown by the fact 1,887 illustrated articles were published in The Penny Magazine between the years of 1832 and 1845. The significant commercial value of illustrations for The Penny Magazine resulted in a whole front page being dedicated to a single picture. These images would often vary between machinery and animals. The popularity of illustrations and Knight’s desire for sales resulted in certain covers becoming scientifically inaccurate, for example an illustration of "The Boa Constrictor" (October 27, 1832) showed the creature attacking its prey with fangs drawn even though the reptile suffocates its prey. Austin argues that the idea of the snake striking at its prey was more likely to stir the reader’s emotions and entice them into purchasing the magazine.

Ultimately it would be these illustrations, so vital to The Penny Magazine’s early success, which would lead to financial problems. Despite the production of an accompanying encyclopedia, The Penny Cyclopedia, the growing periodicals market caused Knight to lose significant market share whilst simultaneously having to pay more for illustrations to compete with other publishers. By 1833 Knight was paying over £20,000 per annum, forcing him to raise the price of the magazine to 4d. and as a result he could not maintain his early commercial success.

== The New Penny Magazine ==
In 1898 Cassell & Co, began publication of a new weekly magazine. It ran from 1898 to 1903 as The New Penny Magazine, from 1903 to January 1925 as The Penny Magazine and from February 1925 to August 1925, as Cassell's Popular Magazine. There were numerous illustrations and each volume, when sold as a bound book, contained the issues for three months. It was initially called The New Penny Magazine to avoid confusion with the earlier, The Penny Magazine.
