= Slough and Windsor Express =

- Type: Weekly local newspaper
- Format: Tabloid
- Owner: Louis Baylis (Maidenhead Advertiser) Charitable Trust
- Publisher: Baylis Community Media CIC
- Editor: James Preston
- Founded: August 1, 1812
- Language: English
- Headquarters: Maidenhead, Berkshire, UK

The Windsor and Eton Express was founded on August 1, 1812 by Charles Knight Snr and his son, Charles Knight Jnr. Charles Knight Snr was a local book seller and printer and edited and printed the newspaper from Church Street in Windsor. When Charles Knight Snr died the paper was passed to his son, who was unhappy with the cost of the newspaper, which was six-and-a-half pence when it began and rose to seven pence in September 1815 due to a heavy stamp duty. Charles Knight Jnr believed in a cheap press, but at the start of the Express newspapers were only ever subscribed to by the wealthy, before the abolition of stamp duty in 1855.

To begin with the newspaper was the Windsor and Eton Express and General Advertiser for the counties of Berkshire, Buckinghamshire, Middlesex, Surrey, Hertfordshire, Hampshire and Wiltshire.

Adverts always covered the front page of the newspaper and it wasn't until the outbreak of World War II that the ads were pushed off the top spot to make way for news. This set the trend of the layout which has continued to this day. Despite this, often parliamentary, national and world news made up the first pages of the paper, with local news usually not making an appearance until page four. Updates on the royals at Windsor Castle were usually found every week in the newspaper.

In 1827 the publication was sold to William Reynell and it became the Windsor and Eton Express and Reading Journal. It was printed at 42 Thames Street, Windsor, and still cost 7d. In 1833, Richard Oxley bought the newspaper and turned it into Windsor and Eton Express, the Berks, Bucks and Middlesex Journal and West Surrey Gazette. By 1840 the price was reduced to 5d and was printed and published at 4 High Street, Windsor. It reduced to 2d in 1870 and became the Windsor and Eton Express and the Maidenhead and Slough Gazette. Frederick William Oxley was on board by this time. In 1880 the price reduced even further to 1d.

Still in the Oxley family in 1910, the Windsor and Eton and Slough Express and the Berks, Bucks, Surrey and Middlesex Journal and the Ascot and District Advertiser were published by Stanley Frederick Oxley, still from the High Street. The newspaper simply became the Windsor, Slough and Eton Express in 1940, priced at 3d and consisting of eight pages. It was printed in Bachelor's Acre and High Street, Windsor, and 12 High Street, Slough.

In 1960, the newspapers separated to what we know them as today: the Windsor and Eton Express and the Slough Express. They cost four pence and were 32 pages long. The first coloured pictures were printed and the Slough office, which opened at 57 High Street. In 1980 the papers were published by the Windsor News Group in Madeira Walk. In 2000 the papers were taken over by Trinity Newspaper.

== Today ==
On April 7, 2008 the Maidenhead Advertiser bought the Slough and Windsor Express series. Today the Express, as part of Baylis Media Ltd, now employs about 85 people, with the biggest department being editorial. It is delivered free to households in the area and is also sold on stands for 60p. The circulation stands at about 44,000 combined for both editions.

The Windsor Express serves the town and surrounding areas, such as Ascot, Sunningdale, Datchet, Dedworth, Eton and Wraysbury. The Slough Express reaches to the areas Iver, Colnbrook, Chalvey, Langley, Britwell, Cippenham, Upton and Farnham Common. Some content is shared across the editions of the Windsor Advertiser and Burnham Advertiser. Both newspapers are published on Fridays. In November 2010 the Express closed its premises in Slough's Ipswich Road and moved to the Advertiser's offices in Maidenhead.

== Supplements ==
As well as the six editions of newspapers every week with a combined readership of nearly 128,000, Baylis Media Ltd also produces a number of special publications. These are the Business Monthly, Life etc. (a lifestyle glossy magazine) and Weddings Etc., both of which are published twice a year.

== Online presence ==
The Express websites were integrated with Maidenhead Advertiser's at the same time as the newspapers were bought in 2008. It benefited from the multi-media arm of Baylis Media Ltd, which published video news content and breaking news as-it-happened. The website won an award in 2008 for the 'Weekly Newspaper Website of the Year' from the Newspaper Society.
