= John Nunn (sailor) =

English sailor and author

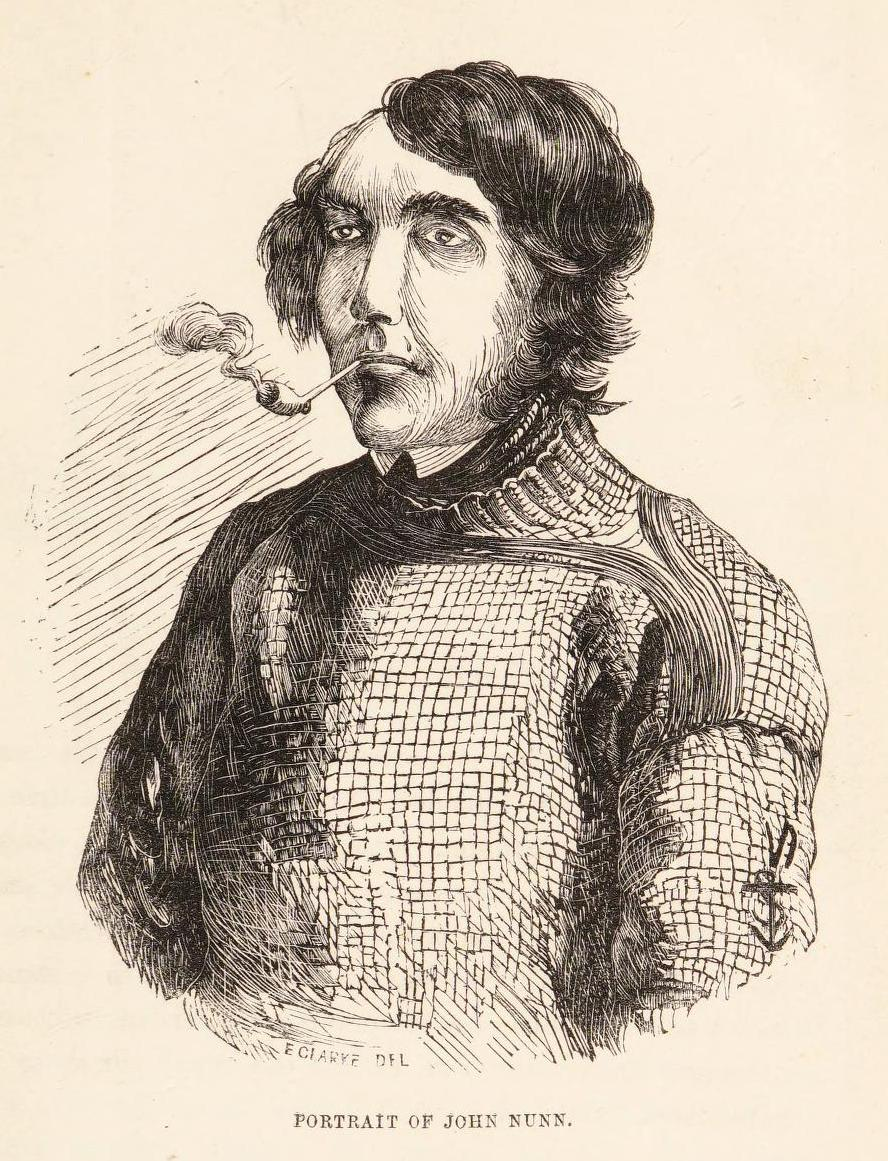
- John Nunn (c. 1849)
- Born: 2 July 1803; Harwich, Essex
- Died: 1860 (aged 56–57)

John Nunn (2 July 1803 – 1860) was an English sailor and author. During his time as a sailor, he was shipwrecked at the uninhabited Kerguelen Islands, which led to a three-and-a-half-year stay there. He recorded his experiences in a book that also described Kerguelen in detail.

== Early life ==
John Nunn was born the son of a fisherman on 2 July 1803 in Harwich, Essex, England. In his early years, he helped his father fish. At the age of 15, he started regular training and work on a turbot fishing trawler. Two years later he went to Holland and hired there on a fishing boat. He survived it sinking in the surf in heavy weather, went back to England, and continued to work as a fisherman on various boats.

In 1825, he joined Royal Sovereign that was headed to Kerguelen Island. The ship arrived on the Kerguelen, which at that time were also called Island of Desolation or just Desolation. The team started the hunt systematically. Due to unfortunate events during an excursion by Nunn and three other crew members in 1825, the Royal Sovereign left the Kerguelen without these four members of their crew, who survived on the Kerguelen.

== Shipwreck ==
On 26 December 1825 the Favourite struck in the rocky shores of the island off the west coast of the archipelago Saddle Island. The ship leaked and sank. The four crew members were able to save themselves and some equipment on the island. During a later search, the mother ship no longer found the excursion participants and sailed back to England without them. The stranded crew remained on Saddle Island.

== Book ==
Nunn's book, “Narrative of the Wreck of the Favorite on the Island of Desolation Kerguelen Island Detailing the Adventures, Sufferings, and Privations of John Nunn" was published in 1850. In the book, he described experiences and observations during and around his three-and-a-half-year of forced stay on the Kerguelen.
