= Charles Knight (publisher) =

English publisher, editor, and author (1791–1873)

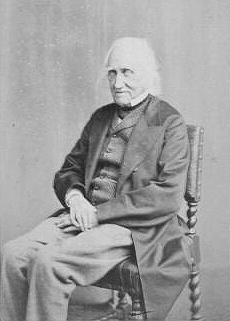
- ca. 1865
- Born: 15 March 1791; Windsor, Berkshire, England
- Died: 9 March 1873 (aged 81); Addlestone, Surrey, England
- Occupations: Publisher, editor, author
- Known for: Knight's Quarterly Magazine; Penny Magazine; Penny Cyclopedia; The Results of Machinery

Charles Knight (15 March 1791 – 9 March 1873) was an English publisher, editor and author. He published and contributed to works such as The Penny Magazine, The Penny Cyclopaedia, and The English Cyclopaedia, and established the Local Government Chronicle.

== Early life ==
The son of Charles Knight, bookseller and printer at Windsor, he was apprenticed to his namesake father. On completion of his indentures he took up journalism and had an interest in several newspaper speculations, including the Windsor, Slough and Eton Express.

In 1823, in conjunction with friends he had made as publisher (1820–1821) of The Etonian, he started Knight's Quarterly Magazine, to which Winthrop Mackworth Praed, Derwent Coleridge and Thomas Macaulay contributed. It lasted for only six issues, but it made Knight's name as publisher and author, beginning a career which lasted over forty years. The periodical included an 1824 review of Frankenstein in which Percy Bysshe Shelley was attributed as the author in a comparison with his wife's second novel Valperga. One of his early publications was the diary of the naval chaplain Henry Teonge (c. 1620–1690). From 1826 to 1827, he published the second series of Alaric Alexander Watts' monthly magazine The Literary Magnet.

== Editor ==
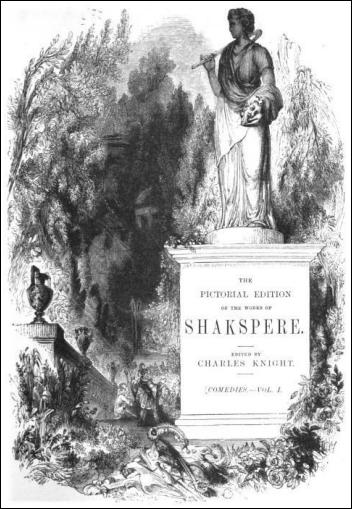
Title page of Knight's Pictorial Shakspere, 1867 edition. The non-standard spelling of Shakespeare's name set a trend.

In 1827 Knight was forced to give up publishing, and became the superintendent of the publications of the Society for the Diffusion of Useful Knowledge, for which he projected and edited The British Almanack and Companion, begun in 1828. In 1829 he resumed business on his own account with the publication of The Library of Entertaining Knowledge, writing several volumes of the series himself. In 1832 and 1833 he started The Penny Magazine (1832-1845) and The Penny Cyclopaedia. Both sold well, the Penny Magazine with a circulation of 200,000 by the end of its first year. The Penny Cyclopaedia, as a result of the heavy excise duty on paper, was only completed in 1844 at a financial loss of £40,000.

He edited and published London (1841) in three volumes, a heavily illustrated history of the city.

Besides many illustrated editions of standard works, including in 1842 an edition of the works of William Shakespeare entitled The Pictorial Shakspere, which had appeared in parts (1838–1841), Knight published a variety of illustrated works, such as Old England, The Land We Live In and The Pictorial Gallery of Arts (Useful Arts; Fine Arts), the latter based on the Great Exhibition of 1851. He also undertook the series known as Knight's Weekly Volume for All Readers (sometimes referred to as Knight's Weekly Volumes) himself contributing the first volume, a biography of William Caxton (1844), as well as one on Sir Thomas Gresham (1845). Many famous books, Harriet Martineau's Tales, Anna Brownell Jameson's Early Italian Painters and G. H. Lewes's Biographical History of Philosophy, appeared for the first time in this series.

His zeal for popular instruction saw him publish The National Cyclopaedia of Useful Knowledge (1847-1851) in 12 volumes, and, The English Encyclopaedia: A Dictionary of Useful Knowledge (1854-1862) in 22 volumes, with a 4 volume supplement. The latter work essentially a revision of The Penny Cyclopaedia. Knight also launched the Local Government Chronicle in 1855, and at about the same time he began his Popular History of England (8 vols., 1856–1862).

== Author ==
In addition to being the editor and author of Penny Magazine and Penny Cyclopedia, and other popular works, Knight wrote The Results of Machinery (1831) and Knowledge is Power, which was published in 1855. A Popular History of England over eight volumes appeared in 1856. In 1864 he withdrew from the business of publishing, but he continued to write nearly to the close of his long life, authoring The Shadows of the Old Booksellers (1865), an autobiography under the title Passages of a Working Life during Half a Century (3 vols., 1864–1865), and an historical novel, Begg'd at Court (1867).

== Inventor ==
In 1838 Knight took out a patent for, "improvements in the process and in the apparatus used in the production of coloured impressions on paper, vellum, parchment and pasteboard by surface printing."

== Legacy ==
Charles Knight died at Addlestone, Surrey on 9 March 1873. A gateway was erected in his memory at the cemetery adjacent to Bachelors Acre in Windsor, where he was buried. He is considered to be the first person to propose the use of stamped newspaper wrappers in 1834, thus is attributed as their inventor.

His many reference books intended for a general audience mark him out as a pioneer in self-improvement.

== Works ==
- The Old Printer and the Modern Press (1854)
- Once Upon a Time (1854)
- The Popular History of England (1856)
- Knowledge is Power, A View of the Productive Forces of Modern Society and the Results of Labor, Capital and Skill. (1859)

== See also ==
- Charles Macfarlane

== Sources ==
- Alice Ada Clowes, Charles Knight, a Sketch (1892);
- Francis Espinasse, in The Critic (May 1860).
