= 1832 in the United Kingdom =

Events from the year 1832 in the United Kingdom.

== Incumbents ==
- Monarch – William IV
- Prime Minister – Charles Grey, 2nd Earl Grey (Whig)
- Foreign Secretary – Henry John Temple, 3rd Viscount Palmerston
- Home Secretary – William Lamb, 2nd Viscount Melbourne
- Secretary of War – Earl of Ripon

== Events ==
- 8 January – Bell's New Weekly Messenger (London) becomes the first known English newspaper to include a political cartoon.
- 12 February – Second cholera pandemic begins to spread in London, starting from East London. It is officially declared over in early May but deaths continue. It will claim at least 3000 victims. In Liverpool, Kitty Wilkinson becomes the "Saint of the Slums" by promoting hygiene.
- 22 March – The Preston Temperance Society is founded by Joseph Livesey, a pioneering organisation in the temperance movement and teetotalism.
- 7 June – The Great Reform Act becomes law, abolishing most rotten boroughs and redistributing Parliamentary seats to newer urban centres of industry and commerce, while extending suffrage to male copyholders and leaseholders of rural property with a minimum annual value or renters of property in boroughs also with a minimum annual value (£10 in most cases). It is estimated that this raises the number of English voters from 400,000 to 650,000. A separate husting is required for every 600 voters. Similar legislation is passed for Scotland (the Scottish Reform Act) and Ireland (An Act to Amend the Representation of the People of Ireland, the Irish Reform Act).
- 4 July – University of Durham is founded by Act of Parliament at the instigation of the authorities of the city's cathedral.
- 16 July – "The Bad Day": 31 sixareens, the traditional fishing craft of Shetland, are lost in a storm with 105 crew.
- 19 July – Anatomy Act provides for licensing and inspection of anatomists, and for unclaimed corpses from public institutions to be available for their dissection.
- 1 August – Prescription Act reforms the law related to easements and establishes the right of ancient lights.
- 7 August – William Howley, Archbishop of Canterbury, has his coach attacked by an angry mob on his first official visit to Canterbury because of his opposition to the Great Reform Act.
- 11–14 August – The body of James Cook, a bookbinder executed the previous day for the murder of his creditor Paas, is hung in irons on a gibbet in Leicester, the last time this practice is carried out.
- 1 September – Reformer Joseph Livesey draws up the first public pledge of teetotalism in Preston, Lancashire.
- 8 December–8 January 1833 – General election, the first under the new franchise, gives the Whigs a decisive majority.
- Commissioners of Woods and Forests become the Commissioners of Woods, Forests, Land Revenues, Works and Buildings, taking over the Office of Works (as its Works Department) and beginning to manage the hereditary land revenues of the Crown in Scotland formerly controlled by the Barons of the Exchequer, under terms of this year's Crown Lands (Scotland) Act.

== Publications ==
- Dr James Kay's study The moral and physical condition of the working-class employed in the cotton manufacture on Manchester.
- Sir Walter Scott's last Waverley novels Count Robert of Paris and Castle Dangerous, published as the 4th series of Tales of My Landlord 'collected and arranged by Jedediah Cleishbotham'.

== Births ==
- 16 January – Sister Dora, born Dorothy Pattison, Anglican nun and nurse (died 1878)
- 27 January – Lewis Carroll, born Charles Lutwidge Dodgson, children's author, mathematician, logician, Anglican deacon and portrait photographer (died 1898)
- 29 January – Boston Corbett, Union Army soldier who shot and killed Abraham Lincoln's assassin, John Wilkes Booth (died after 1888, perhaps 1894)
- 12 March – Charles Boycott, land agent, origin of the word "boycott" (died 1897)
- 14 May – Charles Peace, criminal (hanged 1879)
- 17 June – Sir William Crookes, chemist and physicist (died 1919)
- 30 September – Frederick Roberts, 1st Earl Roberts, field marshal (died 1914)
- 2 October – Edward Burnett Tylor, anthropologist (died 1917)
- 28 November – Leslie Stephen, writer and critic (died 1904)

== Deaths ==
- 13 January – Thomas Lord, cricketer and founder of Lord's Cricket Ground (born 1755)
- 27 January – Andrew Bell, Scottish educationist and Anglican priest (born 1753)
- 10 March – Muzio Clementi, Roman pianist, composer and piano manufacturer (born 1752)
- 6 June – Jeremy Bentham, philosopher (born 1748)
- 23 June – Sir James Hall, 4th Baronet, geologist (born 1761)
- 26 August – Robert Radcliffe, cricketer (born 1797)
- 21 September – Sir Walter Scott, Scottish historical novelist and poet (born 1771)
