= Rob Roy (novel) =

1817 novel by Walter Scott

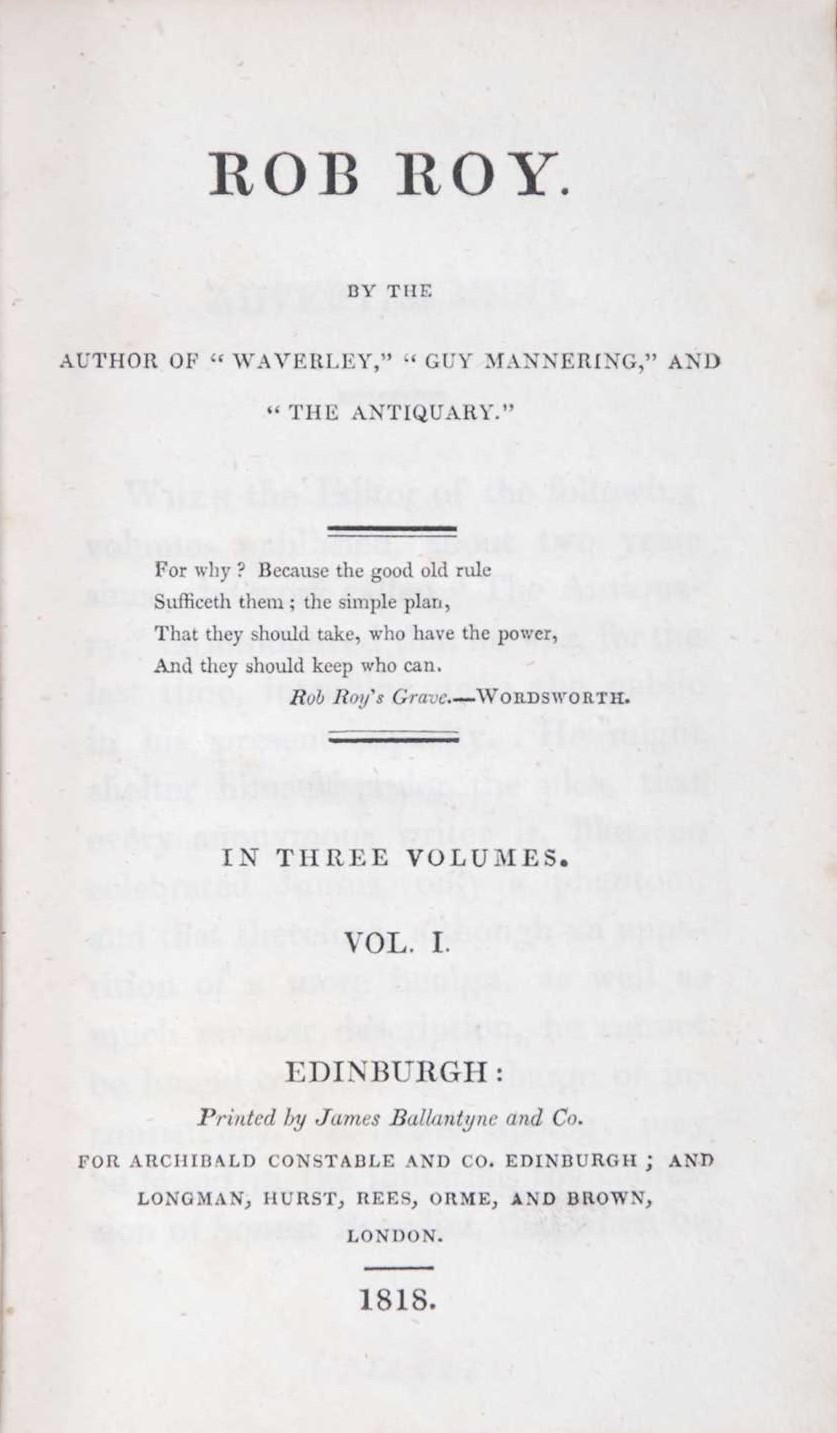
- Title page of 1st edition
- Author: Walter Scott
- Language: English, Lowland Scots, anglicised Scottish Gaelic
- Series: Waverley Novels
- Genre: Historical novel
- Publisher: Archibald Constable, Edinburgh; Longman, Hurst, Rees, Orme and Brown, London
- Publication date: 30 December 1817
- Publication place: Scotland and England simultaneously
- Media type: Print
- Pages: 343 (Edinburgh Edition, 2008)
- Preceded by: The Black Dwarf and Old Mortality
- Followed by: The Heart of Midlothian
- Text: Rob Roy at Wikisource

Rob Roy is an 1817 historical novel by Walter Scott, one of the Waverley novels. It is probably set in 1715, the year of the first Jacobite rising, and the social and economic background to that event are an important element in the novel, though it is not treated directly. The depiction of Rob Roy bears little relation to the historical figure: "there are two Rob Roys. One lived and breathed. The other is a good story, a lively tale set in the past. Both may be accepted as ‘valid', but they serve different needs and interests."

Frank Osbaldistone narrates the story. He is the son of an English merchant who parted from his family home in the north of England near the border with Scotland when he was a young man, being of different religion and temperament than his father or younger brother. Frank is sent by his father to live at the long unseen family home with his uncle and his male cousins, when he refuses to join his father's successful business. In exchange, his father accepts Frank's cousin Rashleigh to work in his business. Rashleigh is an intelligent young man, but he is unscrupulous, and he causes problems for the business of Osbaldistone and Tresham. To resolve the problems, Frank travels into Scotland and meets the larger-than-life title character, Rob Roy MacGregor.

== Composition and sources ==
John Ballantyne, Scott's literary agent, drew up a contract for Rob Roy on 5 May 1817 with Archibald Constable and Longman who had published the first three Waverley novels, the author having lost confidence in the publishers of his most recent fictional work Tales of my Landlord, John Murray and William Blackwood, who had turned out to be insufficiently committed to that project. Scott seems to have begun writing the novel immediately, but it was not completed until late December, partly because of illness.

The Rob Roy of Scott's novel is largely fictitious, with an input from stories Scott had heard, handed down over the generations. As is his wont, he adjusts historical chronology freely for his narrative purposes. A number of printed sources were valuable for different components of the work. Thus, for business matters he used The Universal Dictionary of Trade and Commerce by Malachy Postlethwayt, of which he owned the third edition published in 1766. The depiction of Justice Inglewood and his clerk draws directly on The Justice of the Peace and Parish Officer by Richard Burn, the 13th edition of 1776 being in Scott's library. Bailie Jarvie was suggested by another book he owned: The Highland Rogue: or, the Memorable Actions Of the Celebrated Robert Mac-gregor, Commonly called Rob-Roy [by Elias Brockett] (1723).

== Editions ==
The first edition, in three volumes, dated 1818, was published in Edinburgh on 30 December 1817 by Archibald Constable and Co. and in London on 13 January 1818 by Longman, Hurst, Rees, Orme, and Brown. As with all the Waverley novels before 1827 publication was anonymous. The print run was 10,000 and the price £1 4s. Scott was involved in only two of the subsequent editions of the novel. In 1823, he made significant changes to the text for the 18-month Novels and Tales, though that was essentially a textual dead end. At the end of 1828, he revised the text for the 'Magnum' edition somewhat sporadically and provided notes and a very long introduction; it appeared as Volumes 7 and 8 in December 1829 and January 1830.

The standard modern edition by David Hewitt was published as Volume 5 of the Edinburgh Edition of the Waverley Novels in 2008. This is based on the first edition with emendations principally from Scott's manuscript; the new Magnum material is included in Volume 25a.

== Plot summary ==
The story takes place in 1715, just before the Jacobite Rising, with much of Scotland in turmoil.

Frank Osbaldistone, the narrator, quarrels with his father and is sent to stay with an uncle, Sir Hildebrand Osbaldistone, in Northumberland. Frank falls in love with Diana Vernon, Sir Hildebrand's niece, whose father has been forced to go into hiding because of his Jacobite sympathies. Frank's cousin, Rashleigh, steals important documents vital to the honour and economic solvency of Frank's father, William, and Frank pursues Rashleigh to Scotland. Several times his path crosses the mysterious and powerful figure Robert Roy MacGregor, known as Rob Roy, an associate of Diana's uncle Sir Hildebrand. There is much confusion as the action shifts to the beautiful mountains and valleys around Loch Lomond. A British army detachment is ambushed and there is bloodshed. All Sir Hildebrand's sons but Rashleigh are killed in the Jacobite Rising, and Rashleigh too meets a bloody end. Following this, Frank inherits Sir Hildebrand's property and marries Diana.

The plot has been criticised as disjointed. Robert Louis Stevenson, however, who loved it from childhood, regarded Rob Roy as the best novel of the greatest of all novelists.

The novel is a brutally realistic depiction of the social conditions in Highland and Lowland Scotland in the early 18th century. The Highlanders were compared with American Indians, as regards their primitive, isolated lifestyle. Some of the dialogue is in Scots, and the novel includes a glossary of Scottish words.

== Characters ==
Principal characters are listed in bold.

- William Osbaldistone, of the firm of Osbaldistone and Tresham
- **Frank**, his son
- Mr Owen, his head clerk
- Morris, a government agent
- **Andrew Fairservice**, Frank's servant
- Sir Frederick Vernon, a Jacobite
- **Diana (Die) Vernon**, his daughter

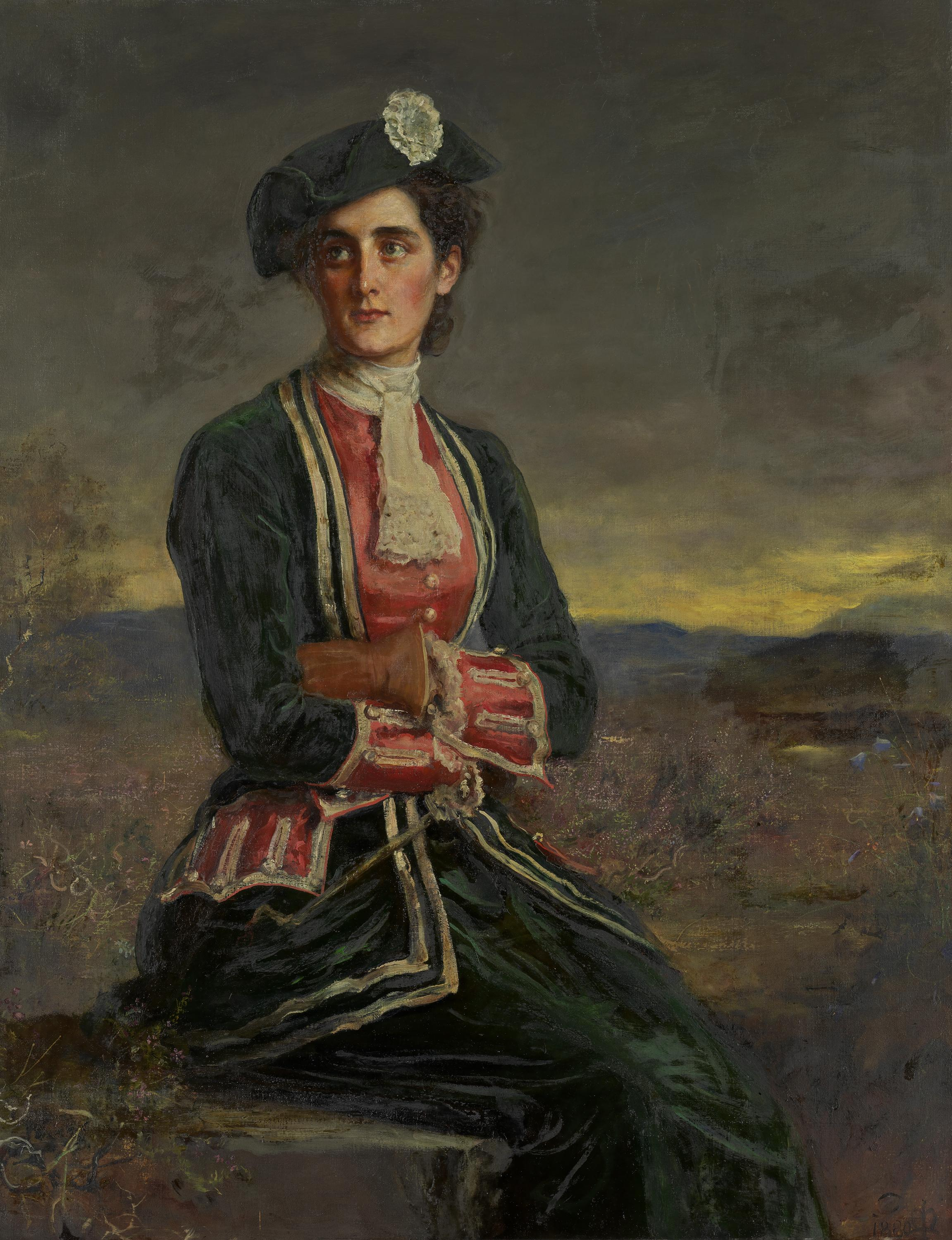
Diana Vernon, painted by John Everett Millais (1880)

- Sir Hildebrand Osbaldistone, her maternal uncle
- Archie, Perceval, Thorncliff, John, Dick, and Wilfred, six of his sons
- **Rashleigh**, his youngest son
- Anthony Syddall, his butler
- Squire Inglewood, a justice of the peace
- Joseph Jobson, his clerk
- Dougal Gregor, jailor at the Glasgow Tolbooth
- **Bailie Nicol Jarvie**, a Glasgow merchant
- Jean MacAlpine, landlady of the inn at Aberfoil
- Major Duncan Galbraith of Garschattin
- Allan Stuart of Iverach and Inverashalloch, two Highlanders
- Father Vaughan, a Roman Catholic priest
- Captain Thornton, an English officer
- **Rob Roy MacGregor (Campbell)**
- **Helen**, his wife
- Robert and Hamish, their sons

== Chapter summary ==
Volume One

Chapter 1: Frank Osbaldistone, the first-person narrator, is summoned home from France by his father to discuss his letter declining to take up his destined place in the family financial business Osbaldistone and Tresham.

Chapter 2: Despite his head clerk Owen's best efforts on behalf of his son, Frank's father makes plans for one of his Northumberland nephews, the sons of Sir Hildebrand Osbaldistone, to fill the place in the firm. He sends Frank north to assist in the procedure.

Chapter 3: On the road, Frank encounters a traveller (who is later identified as Morris) with a particularly heavy portmanteau and teases him by encouraging his fears that he might be intending to rob him.

Chapter 4: The travellers are joined in the inn at Darlington by a Scottish gentleman called Campbell (later identified as Rob Roy) with a shrewd manner of speaking as he declines to accompany Morris as a protector.

Chapter 5: Approaching Osbaldistone Hall, Frank encounters his spirited cousin, Die, out hunting; they ride together to the hall.

Chapter 6: At dinner, Die comments caustically on five of her surviving cousins and tells Frank that the sixth, Rashleigh, is to leave home for a career with Osbaldistone and Tresham. Escaping from the circulating bottle, Frank encounters the gardener, Andrew Fairservice, who expresses his disapproval of the family's Roman Catholicism and Jacobitism.

Chapter 7: Die tells Frank that Morris, who is a government agent, has alleged before the local justice of the peace, Squire Inglewood, that Frank has robbed him of money and dispatches. Die advises Frank to flee to Scotland, but he insists on appearing before Inglewood.

Chapter 8: Arriving at Inglewood-Place, Frank and Die encounter Rashleigh who claims to have been putting in a word for Frank. The hearing before the incompetent Inglewood and his clerk, Jobson, descends into farce.

Chapter 9: Campbell arrives to testify that he was present at the robbery and that Frank was not involved. Frank and Die plan a meeting with Rashleigh.

Chapter 10: Die introduces Frank to the library, her sanctuary. Rashleigh arrives and gives an explanation of how he had persuaded Campbell to testify in Frank's behalf. Over coffee and cards, Frank finds Rashleigh fascinating.

Chapter 11: During a boring Sunday at Osbaldistone Hall, Rashleigh tells Frank that, following a decree by her late father, Die is destined to marry Thorncliffe, the second oldest of the brothers, or to enter a cloister. Frank is unconvinced by Rashleigh's assertion that he is only a friend of Die's.

Chapter 12: Frank gets drunk at dinner and assaults Rashleigh. The next morning, Sir Hildebrand smooths the matter over.

Chapter 13: Die tells Frank of Rashleigh's improper advances towards her as her tutor. Rashleigh leaves for London and Frank writes a warning letter to Owen before taking over the role of tutor.

Volume Two

Chapter 1 (14): Fairservice tells of news conveyed by a pedlar of concern in Parliament about the theft of Morris's portmanteau. Frank sees two figures from a distance in the library window.

Chapter 2 (15): Frank suspects that his letter to Owen has not arrived. Fairservice suggests that the second person in the library was probably the Roman Catholic priest, Fr Vaughan.

Chapter 3 (16): Die advises Frank to go to London, where Rashleigh has been put in charge and will further his own ambitions. Frank confesses his love for her, but she rejects him, citing her dedication to the cloister.

Chapter 4 (17): Frank surprises Die in the library, having learned that Fr Vaughan is away from the area, but she is alone and proves evasive. She asks that they continue as friends and hands him a letter from his father's partner, Tresham, announcing that Rashleigh has left for Scotland with large bills payable to individuals there. Frank resolves to go to Glasgow to investigate.

Chapter 5 (18): Fairservice offers to accompany Frank as his servant, and they leave for Glasgow.

Chapter 6 (19): After disposing of a horse stolen by Fairservice, Frank and his servant arrive in Glasgow and approach the cathedral.

Chapter 7 (20): Frank and Fairservice attend a service in the cathedral's Laigh Kirk, during which Frank receives a whispered warning with a summons to meet the speaker on the bridge.

Chapter 8 (21): After overhearing Fairservice talking about him in unflattering terms to an acquaintance, Frank meets his summoner, Campbell (Rob Roy), on the bridge and is conducted to the tolbooth. They are admitted by Dougal Gregor and Rob identifies himself in Gaelic.

Chapter 9 (22): Frank finds Owen in the tolbooth, committed at the behest of a firm which had worked closely with Osbaldistone and Tresham until made aware of its problems. Bailie Nicol Jarvie arrives and agrees to stand surety for Owen's appearance.

Chapter 10 (23): Jarvie and Rob, who are cousins, engage in good-natured verbal sparring. After receiving a letter from Die, Rob indicates that if Frank and Jarvie come to see him in the glens he may be able to help with the problem created by Rashleigh, the bills falling due in ten days' time. Jarvie takes Frank to his house.

Chapter 11 (24): Fairservice persuades Frank to continue to employ him. Jarvie suggests expedients for Owen to adopt in the meantime.

Chapter 12 (25): Frank encounters Rashleigh in the College-yards and Rob interrupts a duel between them.

Chapter 13 (26): Jarvie fills Frank and Owen in on Rob's background and Rashleigh's likely aim of fomenting Jacobitism in the Highlands.

Volume Three

Chapter 1 (27): As they journey towards the Highlands, Jarvie advises Frank and Fairservice how to conduct themselves.

Chapter 2 (28): At the inn known as the Clachan of Aberfoil, the travellers become involved in a skirmish with two Highlanders who are in possession. A third Highlander, Dougal Gregor, fights on Jarvie's behalf until the Lowlander, Duncan Galbraith of Garschattachin, intervenes to calm things down.

Chapter 3 (29): Frank receives a letter from Rob postponing their meeting, and Fairservice is worried about becoming involved with him. Jarvie defends Rob against the opposition of the two Highlanders, now identified as Inverashalloch and Allan Stuart of Inverach, and Galbraith. An English officer arrives with a body of infantry to arrest a couple, whom he takes Frank and Jarvie to be, for correspondence with the outlawed Rob.

Chapter 4 (30): Guided reluctantly by Dougal, who has been captured, the infantry party is routed by Highlanders under Rob's wife, Helen.

Chapter 5 (31): The survivors of the skirmish are brought before Helen whose sons, James and Robert, arrive and announce that Rob has been taken captive by Galbraith with his Lennox militia. Helen orders that Morris, who had been kept by her sons as a hostage for Rob's safety, be drowned.

Chapter 6 (32): Frank carries a defiant message from Helen to the Duke (unidentified in the fiction) who holds Rob, but the Duke declines to release him. After news is received that his Highland allies have deserted him, the Duke interviews Rob.

Chapter 7 (33): Rob escapes on the march. Frank, accused of helping him, flees and receives a packet containing Rashleigh's bills from Die, whom he encounters in company with an unknown gentleman.

Chapter 8 (34): After Die and the gentleman have left, Frank is joined by Rob who indicates that she is now united with 'his Excellency'. They rejoin the clan and Rob, after indignantly rejecting Jarvie's offer to oversee his sons as apprentice weavers, repays a substantial loan from his cousin.

Chapter 9 (35): Rob expresses to Frank his conflicted feelings about his sons' futures. The next morning, on the road, he defends his clan's behaviour and indicates that Rashleigh has switched to the government side. Helen hands Frank a ring as a parting gift from Die.

Chapter 10 (36): Frank and Jarvie leave the Highlands for Glasgow, where Frank is reunited with his father and business matters are sorted.

Chapter 11 (37): The 1715 rebellion breaks out and Frank and his father return to London. Five of Sir Hildebrand's six surviving sons die in rapid succession, followed by their father. Frank goes north to take possession of Osbaldistone Hall and learns from Inglewood that Die's companion was actually her father, Sir Frederick, who had been publicly declared dead.

Chapter 12 (38): Frank is joined in the library by Die and her father, who are fugitives from the government, but their presence is carelessly divulged by Fairservice to Clerk Jobson's spy.

Chapter 13 (39): During the night, government officials arrive at the Hall. Die and her father attempt to escape but are captured by Rashleigh. As the prisoners are removed, Rashleigh is run through by Rob and expires laying a curse on his patrimony. The Vernons leave for France where Sir Frederick dies, leaving Die free to return to Britain and marry Frank who lived happily with her until her eventual death.

== Historical setting ==
The story takes place just before the Jacobite rising of 1715, with much of Scotland in turmoil. A British army detachment is ambushed and there is bloodshed. The eponymous Rob Roy is badly wounded at the Battle of Glen Shiel in 1719, in which a British army of Scots and English defeat a Jacobite and Spanish expedition that aimed to restore the Stuart monarchy.

== Literary and cultural setting at time of publication ==
Rob Roy was written at a time when many Europeans started regretting colonialism and imperialism, as reports circulated back of horrendous atrocities towards indigenous cultures. It was also a time when debates raged about the slave trade, the working class started to demand representation, and, more relevant to the novel, the disastrous effect of the Highland Clearances. During this era, William Wordsworth wrote The Conventions of Cintra, praising Spanish and Portuguese resistance to Napoleonic forces; Lord Byron would go on to praise Amazonian women in Childe Harold's Pilgrimage, inverting the "polite" norms of femininity that the modern "civilized" world placed on them; and, finally, Scott would write about similar events in The Vision of Don Roderick. The term "guerrilla" came about during this period due to the influence of the Peninsular War.

== Reception ==
Rob Roy met with a generally enthusiastic reception from the reviewers. Only three (The Anti-Unionist, The British Critic, and The Theatrical Inquisitor), were predominantly hostile. The characters were generally admired, though a degree of caricature was sometimes detected; several reviewers pointed out that some of them bore a distinct resemblance to characters in the preceding novels (Die to Flora in Waverley, Helen to Meg Merilees in Guy Mannering, and Fairservice to Dandie Dinmont in Guy Mannering and Cuddie Headrigg in Old Mortality) but they mostly noted significant variations which meant they were not mere repetitions. Although one or two reviewers were surprised by the failure of Rob to live up to his prominence in the title, he was generally judged a success. The Highland landscape descriptions and striking individual scenes also attracted much praise. Most reviewers found the story rather weak, as usual with this author, with improbable coincidences and a hurried conclusion.

== Adaptations ==
Rob Roy MacGregor; or, Auld Lang Syne, Isaac Pocock's dramatic adaptation of the novel, with music by John Davy and H. Bishop, premiered at the Theatre Royal, Covent Garden, on 12 March 1818. It was first produced at the Theatre Royal, Edinburgh, in February 1819. It was by far the most successful of the National Dramas based of Scott's novels.

Although there have been several heavily fictionalised feature films featuring a heroic Robert Roy MacGregor over the years, none of them to date has been directly adapted from Walter Scott's novel, in which MacGregor plays a lesser role than Frank Osbaldistone. For example, the 1995 film Rob Roy has no other connection with the novel than the name. The same is true of the 1953 film Rob Roy: The Highland Rogue.

In 1960, the Gateway Theatre in Edinburgh presented a musical adaptation of Scott's novel by Robert Kemp, with songs by Ian Robertson.

There was a 1961 British TV version.

== Beverages ==
- A brand of blended whisky, Bailie Nicol Jarvie, is named after a character from the book.
- The Rob Roy cocktail is similar to a Manhattan cocktail. It first appeared in New York City around 1890.
