= The Knight's Tomb =

Poem by Samuel Taylor Coleridge

- by Samuel Taylor Coleridge
- Medieval knight on carparisoned mount
- Country: England
- Genre(s): Romanticism; Medievalism
- Meter: Dactylic; Spondaic
- Rhyme scheme: ABAB CCDD EEE
- Publication date: 1831; 1834
- Lines: 11

"The Knight's Tomb" is a short poem of eleven lines written by Samuel Taylor Coleridge, and published by the author in 1834. The date of composition is uncertain, although an early version was quoted from in print as early as 1820.

== Text ==
The poem was first published in Poetical Works (1834).

Where is the grave of Sir Arthur O'Kellyn?
Where may the grave of that good man be?—
By the side of a spring, on the breast of Helvellyn,
Under the twigs of a young birch tree!
The oak that in summer was sweet to hear,
And rustled its leaves in the fall of the year,
And whistled and roared in the winter alone,
Is gone,—and the birch in its stead is grown.—
The Knight's bones are dust,
And his good sword rust;—
His soul is with the saints, I trust.

== History ==
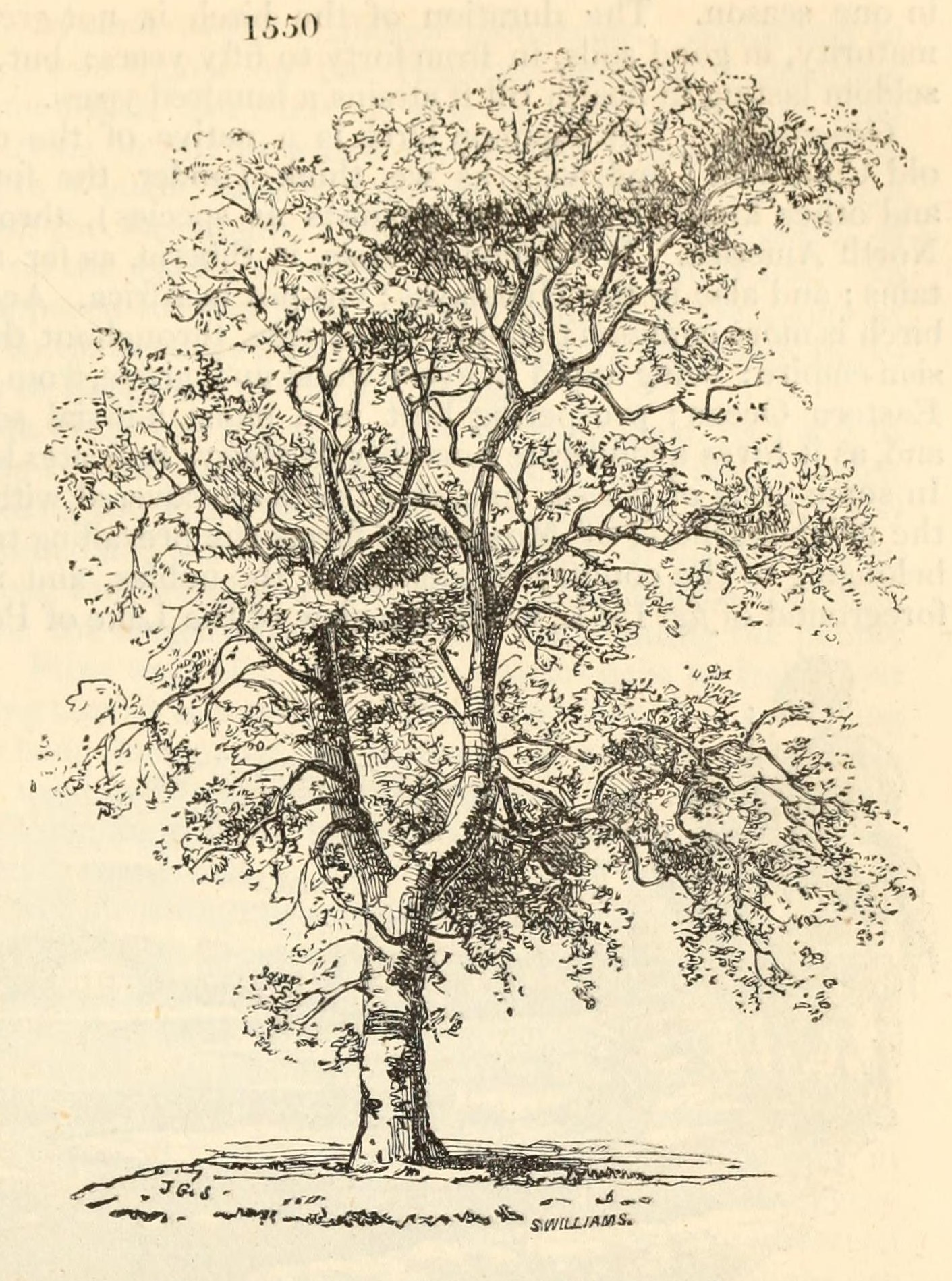
The Birch

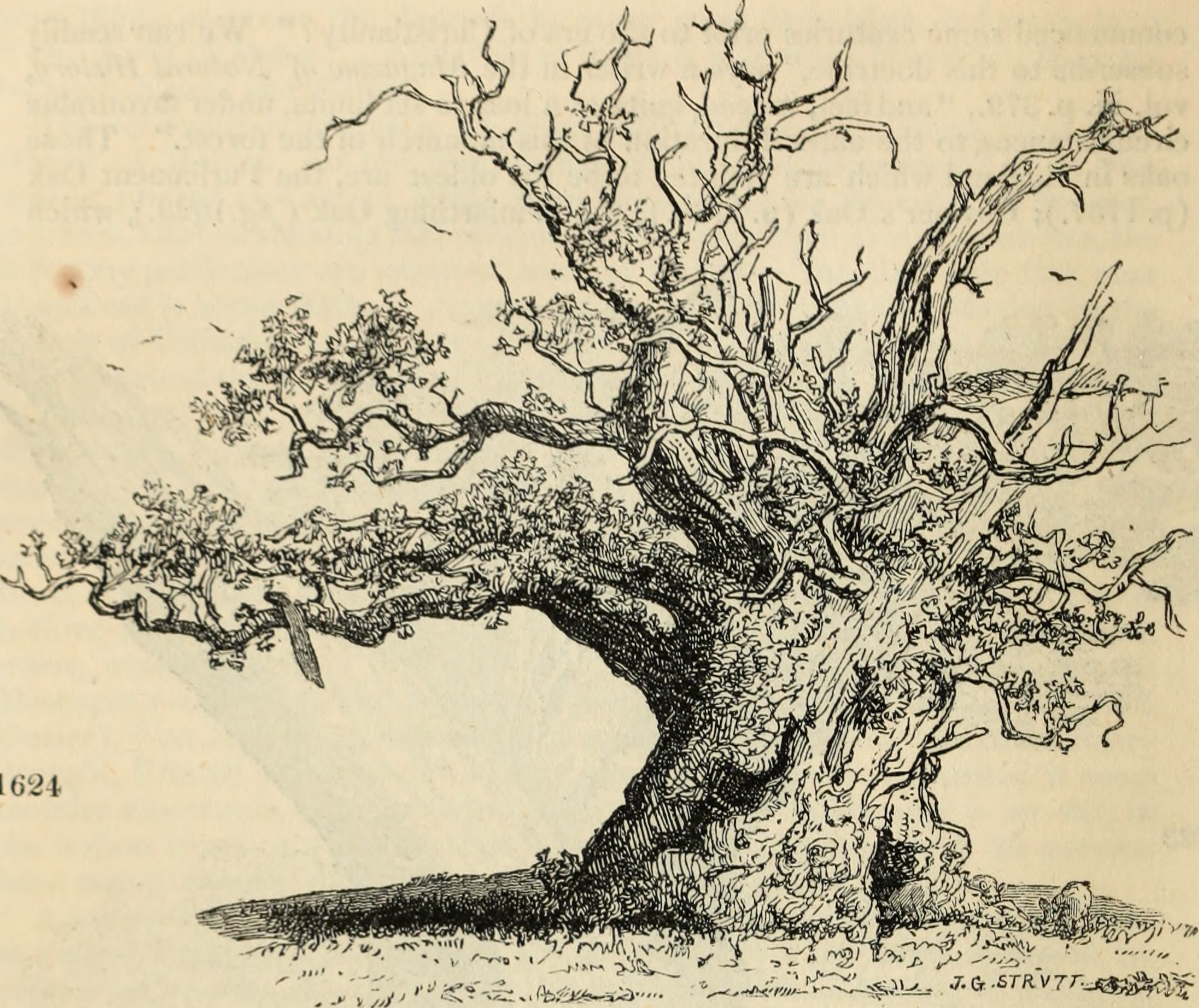
The Oak

James Gillman says that these lines were composed 'as an experiment for a metre', and repeated by the author to 'a mutual friend', who 'spoke of his visit to Highgate' and repeated them to Scott on the following day. The last three lines, 'somewhat altered', had previously been quoted by Sir Walter Scott in Ivanhoe (1820), chapter viii, and again in Castle Dangerous (1831), chapter ix. They run thus:—

The knights are dust,
And their good swords are rust;—
Their souls are with the saints, we trust.

Gillman says that the Ivanhoe quotation convinced Coleridge that Scott was the author of the Waverley Novels. In the Appendix to the 'Notes' to Castle Dangerous, which was edited and partly drawn up by John Gibson Lockhart, a different version of the poem is quoted in full, with a prefatory note ('The author has somewhat altered part of a beautiful unpublished fragment of Coleridge').

Where is the grave of Sir Arthur Orellan,—
Where may the grave of that good knight be?
By the marge of a brook, on the slope of Helvellyn,
Under the boughs of a young birch-tree.
The Oak that in summer was pleasant to hear,
That rustled in autumn all wither'd and sear,
That whistled and groan'd thro' the winter alone,
He hath gone, and a birch in his place is grown.
The knight's bones are dust,
His good sword is rust;
His spirit is with the saints, we trust.

This version must have been transcribed from a manuscript in Lockhart's possession, and represents a first draft of the lines as published in 1834. These lines are, no doubt, an 'experiment for a metre'. The upward movement (ll. 1–7) is dactylic: the fall (ll. 8–11) is almost, if not altogether, spondaic. The whole forms a complete stanza, or metrical scheme, which may be compared with ll. 264–78 of the First Part of Christabel. Sara Coleridge, who must have been familiar with Gillman's story, dates the composition of "The Knight's Tomb" to 1802.

== Bibliography ==
- Coleridge, E. H. (1912). The Complete Poetical Works of Samuel Taylor Coleridge. Vol. 1. Oxford: Clarendon Press.
- Gibbs, Warren E. (1933). "S. T. Coleridge's 'The Knight's Tomb' and 'Youth and Age'". The Modern Language Review, 28(1): pp. 83–85.
- Gillman, James (1838). The Life of Samuel Taylor Coleridge. Vol. 1. London: William Pickering.
