= Count Robert of Paris =

1832 novel by Sir Walter Scott

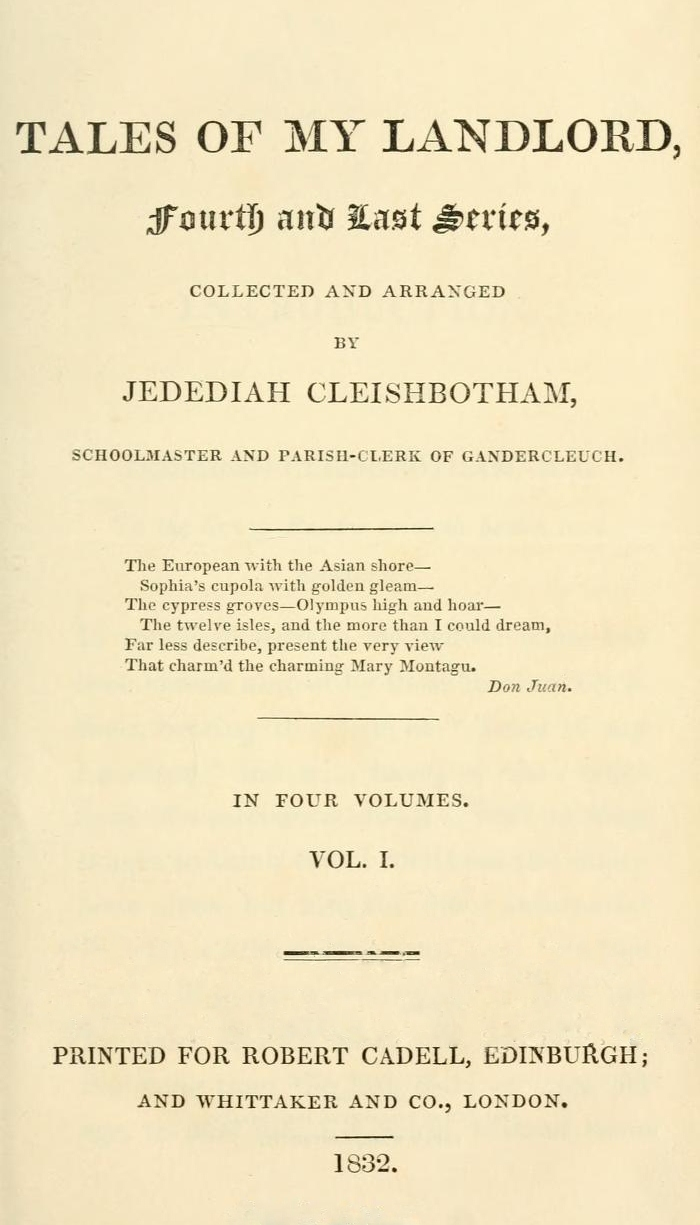
- Author: Sir Walter Scott
- Language: English
- Series: Tales of My Landlord (4th series); Waverley Novels
- Genre: Historical novel
- Publisher: Robert Cadell (Edinburgh); Whittaker and Co. (London)
- Publication date: 1832 (1 December 1831)
- Publication place: Scotland
- Media type: Print
- Pages: 365 (Edinburgh Edition, 2006)
- Followed by: The Betrothed

Count Robert of Paris (1832) was the second-last of the Waverley novels by Walter Scott. It is part of Tales of My Landlord, 4th series, along with Castle Dangerous. The novel is set in Constantinople at the end of the 11th century, during the build-up of the First Crusade and centres on the relationship between the various crusading forces and the Byzantine Emperor Alexius I Comnenus.

== Composition and sources ==
After completing Anne of Geierstein at the end of April 1829, Scott's energies were devoted principally to non-fictional works, most notably a two-volume History of Scotland. But a new novel was always on his schedule; by February 1830, Scott had determined on a narrative of the First Crusade, and was soon undertaking appropriate research while working on Tales of a Grandfather and Letters on Demonology and Witchcraft. The title Robert of Paris was settled by 5 September, and composition began in November.

In spite of concern caused by unfavourable comments on the opening chapters by James Ballantyne and Robert Cadell, Scott finished the first volume before the end of January 1831, using the services of William Laidlaw as amanuensis when he was available. In mid-March, Scott thought the second volume was complete and began the third, but there had been a miscalculation, and he had to provide additional material to bring the second volume up to the usual length. Towards the end of April only a third of the final volume remained to be written, but Scott was delayed by objections by Ballantyne and Cadell to Brenhilda's pregnancy and her combat with Anna Comnena.

After a fitful attempt to change his text, Scott laid it aside to work on the second French series of Tales of a Grandfather (which was never completed), and then spent late June, July, and August writing Castle Dangerous, before completing Count Robert on 14 September: these final stages involved a good deal of textual maneuvering, including the provision of extra material consisting of an approach by Alexius to the Manichaeans, which in the event was not needed. Two days later, on 16 September, Scott accepted a suggestion by J. G. Lockhart that Count Robert should appear together with Castle Dangerous as a fourth series of Tales of my Landlord. After he had left for the Mediterranean on 29 October, Cadell and Lockhart radically revised Scott's text without any further authorial input, completing their work early in November.

The two principal sources for Count Robert were Histoire de l'Empereur Aléxis by Anna Comnena, included in Histoire de Constantinople by Louis Cousin (1672–74), and The History of the Decline and Fall of the Roman Empire (1776–88) by Edward Gibbon. Scott was more inclined towards Gibbon's sceptical approach as opposed to Anna's panegyrics.

== Editions ==
Tales of my Landlord, Fourth and Last Series, dated 1832, was published on 1 December 1831 by Robert Cadell in Edinburgh and Whittaker and Co. in London. The print run was 5000, and the price two guineas (£2 2s or £2.10). Scott may have had some input into the text of the 'Magnum' edition of the series, which appeared posthumously as Volumes 46, 47, and 48 (part) in March, April, and May 1833; he sent Lockhart a list of errata from Naples on 16 February 1832, but it has not survived. He also provided an introduction for Castle Dangerous, but apparently none for Count Robert.

The standard modern edition of Count Robert of Paris, by J. H. Alexander, was published as Volume 23a of the Edinburgh Edition of the Waverley Novels in 2006; this is based on the first edition, with extensive emendations mainly from the surviving fragments of manuscript and proofs, which are designed to restore as much of Scott's original work as possible.

== Plot introduction ==
Set in Constantinople at the time of the First Crusade, Count Robert of Paris portrays the impact of Western medieval values and attitudes on the sophisticated Romano-Greek classical society of the Byzantine Empire. The two main characters are Count Robert, a Frankish knight, and Hereward, an Anglo-Saxon refugee from the Norman conquest of England, serving as a mercenary soldier in the Varangian Guard of the Emperor Alexios I Komnenos. Count Robert was based on an actual but minor historical figure who disrupted negotiations between the Crusader leaders and the Emperor by occupying the latter's throne when it was temporarily vacated.

== Plot summary ==
This section of the article includes text from the revised 1898 edition of Henry Grey's A Key to the Waverley Novels (1880), now in the public domain.

At the end of the 11th century, the Byzantine capital of Constantinople was threatened by Turkic nomads from the east, and by the Franks from the west. Unable to rely on his Greek subjects to repel their incursions, the emperor was obliged to maintain a body-guard of Varangians, or mercenaries from other nations, of whom the citizens and native soldiers were very jealous. One of these, the Anglo-Saxon Hereward, had just been attacked by Sebastes, when a Varangian officer, Tatius, intervened and led him to the palace. Here he was introduced to the imperial family, surrounded by their attendants; and the Princess Anna was reading a roll of history she had written, when her husband Brennius entered to announce the approach of the armies composing the first Crusade. Convinced that he was powerless to prevent their advance, the emperor offered them hospitality on their way; and, the leaders having agreed to acknowledge his sovereignty, the various hosts marched in procession before his assembled army.

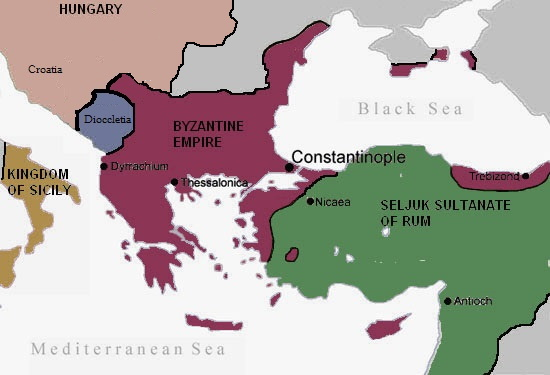
The Byzantine Empire in 1090

As Emperor Comnenus, however, moved forward to receive the homage of Count Bohemond, his vacant throne was insolently occupied by Count Robert of Paris, who was with difficulty compelled to vacate it, and make his submission. The defiant knight, accompanied by his wife Brenhilda, afterwards met the sage Agelastes, who related the story of an enchanted princess, and decoyed them to his hermitage overlooking the Bosphorus. Here they were introduced to the empress and her daughter, who, attended by Brennius, came to visit the sage, and were invited to return with them to the palace to be presented to the emperor. At the State banquet which followed, the guests, including Sir Bohemond, were pledged by their royal host, and urged to accept the golden cups they had used. On waking next morning, Count Robert found himself in a dungeon with a tiger, and that Ursel was confined in an adjoining one. Presently an aggressive orangutan descended through a trap-door, soon followed by the armed Sebastes. Both were overpowered by the Count, when Hereward made his appearance, and undertook to release his Norman adversary.

A treasonable conference was meanwhile taking place between Tatius and Agelastes, who had failed in endeavouring to tamper with the Anglo-Saxon; and the countess had been unwillingly transported by the slave Diogenes to a garden-house for a secret interview with Brennius, whom she challenged to knightly combat in the hearing of her husband. Having hidden the count, Hereward encountered his sweetheart Bertha, who had followed Brenhilda as her attendant, and then obtained an audience of the imperial family, who were discussing recent events, including a plot in which Brennius was concerned for seizing the throne, and received permission to communicate with the Duke de Bouillon. Bertha volunteered to be his messenger, and, at an interview with the council of Crusaders at Scutari, she induced them to promise that fifty knights, each with ten followers, should attend the combat to support their champion.

Having made his confession to the Patriarch, while Agelastes was killed by the orangutan as he argued with Brenhilda respecting the existence of the devil, the emperor led his daughter to the cell in which Ursel was confined, with the intention of making him her husband, instead of Brennius. She had, however, been persuaded by her mother to intercede for the traitor, and Ursel was merely placed under the care of the slave doctor Douban to be restored to health after his long imprisonment. The emperor had decided that Brennius should fight the Count of Paris, instead of the countess, and all the preparations for the combat had been made, when the ships conveying the Crusaders hove in sight; and, after defeating the Greek fleet, they landed in sight of the lists. Brennius, in the meantime, was pardoned, and, in answer to shouts of discontent from the assembled crowd, Ursel was led forth to announce his restoration to liberty and the imperial favour, and the conspiracy was crushed. Hereward then appeared to do battle with Count Robert, and, saved from the knight's axe by Bertha, he joined the Crusaders, obtaining on his return the hand of his betrothed, and, ultimately, a grant of land from William Rufus, adjacent to the New Forest in Hampshire, where he had screened her when a girl from the tusk of a wild boar.

== Characters ==
Principal characters in bold

- **Alexius I Comnenus**, Greek Emperor of Constantinople
- The Empress Irene Doukaina, his wife
- **Anna Comnena**, their daughter
- **Nicephorus Briennius**, her husband.
- Astarte and Violante, her attendants
- Achilles **Tatius**, officer of the Imperial Varangian Guard
- **Hereward**, an Anglo-Saxon, his subaltern
- Stephanos Castor, a wrestler
- Lysimachus, a designer
- Harpax, centurion of the Immortals - a corps of the Greek army
- Ismail, a Muslim guard of the Immortals
- Sebastes of Mitylene, another guard
- Nicanor, commander-in-chief of the Greek army
- Zosimus, Greek patriarch
- **Michael Agelastes**, a sage
- Leaders of the First Crusade
  - Godfrey de Bouillon
  - Peter the Hermit
  - Count Baldwin (future Baldwin I of Jerusalem)
  - Count de Vermandois
  - Bohemond I of Antioch
  - Prince Tancred of Otranto (future Tancred, Prince of Galilee)
  - Raymond IV, Count of Toulouse
  - **Count Robert of Paris**
- **Brenhilda**, Countess of Paris
- Toxartis, a Scythian chieftain
- Agatha, afterwards **Bertha**, Hereward's betrothed
- Diogenes, a Negro slave
- **Zedekias Ursel**, a rival for the throne
- Douban, a slave skilled in medicine
- **Sylvan**, an ourang-outang

== Chapter summary ==
The chapter numbering follows the Edinburgh Edition. In other editions (where there are substantial differences in the text, especially towards the end of the novel) Chapters 24 and 25 are not divided: the different numbers are given in square brackets.

Volume One

Ch. 1: The narrator provides a brief history of Constantinople and its decline before introducing the Emperor Alexius.

Ch. 2: A succession of citizens react to the Anglo-Saxon Hereward walking and sleeping at the Golden Gate. He repels an attack by Sebastes, one of the guard under the centurion Harpax, before being escorted to the imperial palace by Achilles Tatius, who fills him in on procedures.

Ch. 3: Achilles introduces Hereward at Court, where Anna Comnena asks him to indicate any inaccuracies in her account of the battle of Laodicea.

Ch. 4: Hereward is moved by Anna's reading of her account of the battle, where his brother died.

Ch. 5: Anna's husband Nicephorus Briennius brings news of a new advance by the Crusaders. Hereward gives his unfavourable view of the Normans.

Ch. 6: Achilles asks Hereward to observe the conduct of the sage Agelastes, with a view to ascertaining how he obtains influence at Court.

Ch. 7: Alexius gives orders to impede the Crusaders' advance. After transmitting this welcome news to his fellow-Varangians, Hereward is conducted by a black slave to the ruins of the temple of Cybele.

Ch. 8: At the temple Hereward resists the advances of Agelastes, who tempts him with theological unorthodoxy and an invitation to favour Achilles above the Emperor, and claims to be able to give him news about his beloved Bertha. Achilles and Agelastes plot against Alexius. Achilles teases Hereward about Agelastes.

Ch. 9: A month later, the Crusaders agree to be subject to Alexius, but Count Robert disrupts the fealty ceremony on the shores of the Propontis.

Ch. 10: The narrator sketches the relationship between Robert and Brenhilda. On their way back to Constantinople they meet Agelastes, who tells them the story of the sleeping princess of Zulichium, resulting in Robert's expression of unflinching devotion to his wife. They accept his invitation to visit his kiosk.

Ch. 11: On their way to the kiosk the Count and Countess rout an aggressive band of Scythians.

Ch. 12: Agelastes welcomes the martial pair to his retreat, and guests are heard approaching.

Volume Two

Ch. 1 (13): The imperial party arrive at the kiosk, where Nicephorus offends Brenhilda by his flirtatious manner at table. On the way back to the city, Hereward quarrels with Count Robert as a Norman. Agelastes advises Alexius that Robert and Brenhilda may be tamed by appealing to their love of fame.

Ch. 2 (14): Alexius and Agelastes distrust each other. Robert breaks one of the mechanical lions of Solomon guarding the imperial throne. Alexius and Agelastes plan how to deal with the Crusaders, and Alexius makes Robert and Bohemond uneasy with each other.

Ch. 3 (15): Robert wakes up to find himself in a prison cell. He kills a tiger and makes contact with Ursel in a neighbouring cell.

Ch. 4 (16): The ourang-outang Sylvan leaps into the cell: Robert spares his life but kills his keeper Sebastes. He then fights Hereward, but they agree to join forces to seek Brenhilda and help Ursel.

Ch. 5 (17): Achilles and Agelastes discuss further their conspiracy against Alexius, one stage of which involves promoting Nicephorus and pandering to his desire for Brenhilda. The sage's servant Dionysus informs him that Brenhilda is in the garden-house, to which he admits Nicephorus by unblocking a postern.

Ch. 6 (18): In the dungeon Hereward and Robert assess Brenhilda's situation. They go to the garden-house, where they overhear Brenhilda preparing for Nicephorus. When he arrives she offers to fight him herself, in the absence of her husband.

Ch. 7 (19): Robert expresses his confidence in Brenhilda's ability to defeat Nicephorus, and Hereward affords him accommodation in his quarters. Hereward returns to Agelastes' garden, where he reports to Achilles that Robert is at liberty and receives a warrant to apprehend him.

Ch. 8 (20): On his way to his quarters, Hereward encounters Bertha, who has been alarmed by Sylvan. The narrator relates their story. Bertha expresses her anxiety about Brenhilda's readiness for combat for a reason she cannot divulge, and Hereward offers himself as a reserve champion if Robert doesn't appear to do battle in her stead. Hereward tells Robert he will arrange for the Count and himself to be present at the combat.

Ch. 9 (21): Alexius tells Anna and his wife Irene that Hereward has revealed the treacherous plans of Nicephorus and his associates. He agrees that Robert should be at Hereward's disposal, and that a contingent of troops under the Duke of Bouillon should attend the lists in case of treachery against Brenhilda.

Ch. 10 (22): Hereward hears in the street a proclamation of the combat between Nicephorus and Robert, and discusses with Achilles its implications for the plot. At his quarters, Bertha agrees to take a message to Geoffrey de Bouillon and Tancred of Otranto.

Ch. 11 (23): Vexhalia sees her husband Osmund off on Bertha's mission. Bertha delivers the message to Bouillon and Tancred, and their troops achieve technical compliance with their undertaking to Alexius by adopting a retrograde motion to each of the boats conveying them to Constantinople.

Volume Three

Ch. 1 (24): There is much speculation in Constantinople as to what is going on, and Alexius resolves to consult the Patriarch Zosimus.

Ch. 2 (25) [24 ctd]: Zosimus reassures Alexius that his future reputation is secure and suggests that the fate of Ursel (believed to have been starved to death) is a central issue in the prevailing unrest.

Ch. 3 (26) [25]: Agelastes attempts to convert Brenhilda to his scepticism and is killed by Sylvan.

Ch. 4 (27) [26]: In the dungeon Alexius introduces Ursel to Anna as a potential future husband. Rushing up the steps she encounters Hereward, who comforts her. Irene pleads with Anna that Nicephorus be pardoned: Anna's initial severity is tempered when her husband is revealed and joins in the plea. She insists, though, that he should remain in captivity and not take part in the combat.

Ch. 5 (28) [27]: Alexius commits Ursel to the care of the medical slave Douban. The next morning, seeking his co-operation, he finds him devoid of earthly aspirations.

Ch. 6 (29) [28] : Ursel tells Douban he is ready to help Alexius and then retire to a monastery.

Ch. 7 (30) [29]: The seating arrangements at the lists, prioritising the Varangians, offends Harpax and other supporters of the Immortals (the military élite). Tancred's troops arrive, surviving heavy attack by the imperial admiral.

Ch. 8 (31) [30]: Alexius despatches a confused Achilles, together with his rival Nicanor, commander of the Greek army, to negotiate with Tancred.

Ch. 9 (32) [31] : Alexius pardons Nicephorus on his way to execution. Peeved at being used as a pawn, Anna decides to offer to fight Brenhilda, believing her father will not permit it.

Ch. 20 (33) [32]: Tancred makes clear that his intentions are pacific, and Achilles sees him as likely to frustrate the conspiracy against Alexius. Ursel is revealed to the people and gives Alexius his support.

Ch. 21 (34) [33]: Alexius announces Agelastes' death and grants a general pardon. Anna insists on proceeding with the combat, against Douban's advice. As the duel is about to begin, Alexius directs that instead the matter be resolved by means of a riddle presented by Anna to Brenhilda. The Countess rejects the riddle, but as the combat begins her pregnant condition disables her. In a second combat Robert betters Hereward, but he spares him at Bertha's appeal and accepts him into his crusading service. Sylvan appears and is entrusted to Hereward's care. Five months later, Brenhilda gives birth to a son.

Ch. 22 (35) [34]: The narrator presents Anna's account of her father's remaining career and death. After being wounded at the battle of Dorylæum, Robert retires to France and arranges a Hampshire estate for Hereward. The author takes his farewell.

== Reception ==
Two-thirds of the reviews of Count Robert were appreciative, and even enthusiastic. The knowledge that the fourth series of Tales of my Landlord was probably Scott's last publication may well have played a part in the favourable reception, and there was not much detailed criticism of the volumes, but most of the reviewers found in Count Robert abundant evidence of the author's powers of characterisation, story-telling, description, and historical recreation. A couple of the enthusiasts did discern a tendency to tedium in dialogue or descriptive detail, and the minority who judged the publication a failure added accusations of improbability, narrative vagueness, disgust, dubious morality, and tastelessness.
