= Anne of Geierstein =

1829 novel by Walter Scott

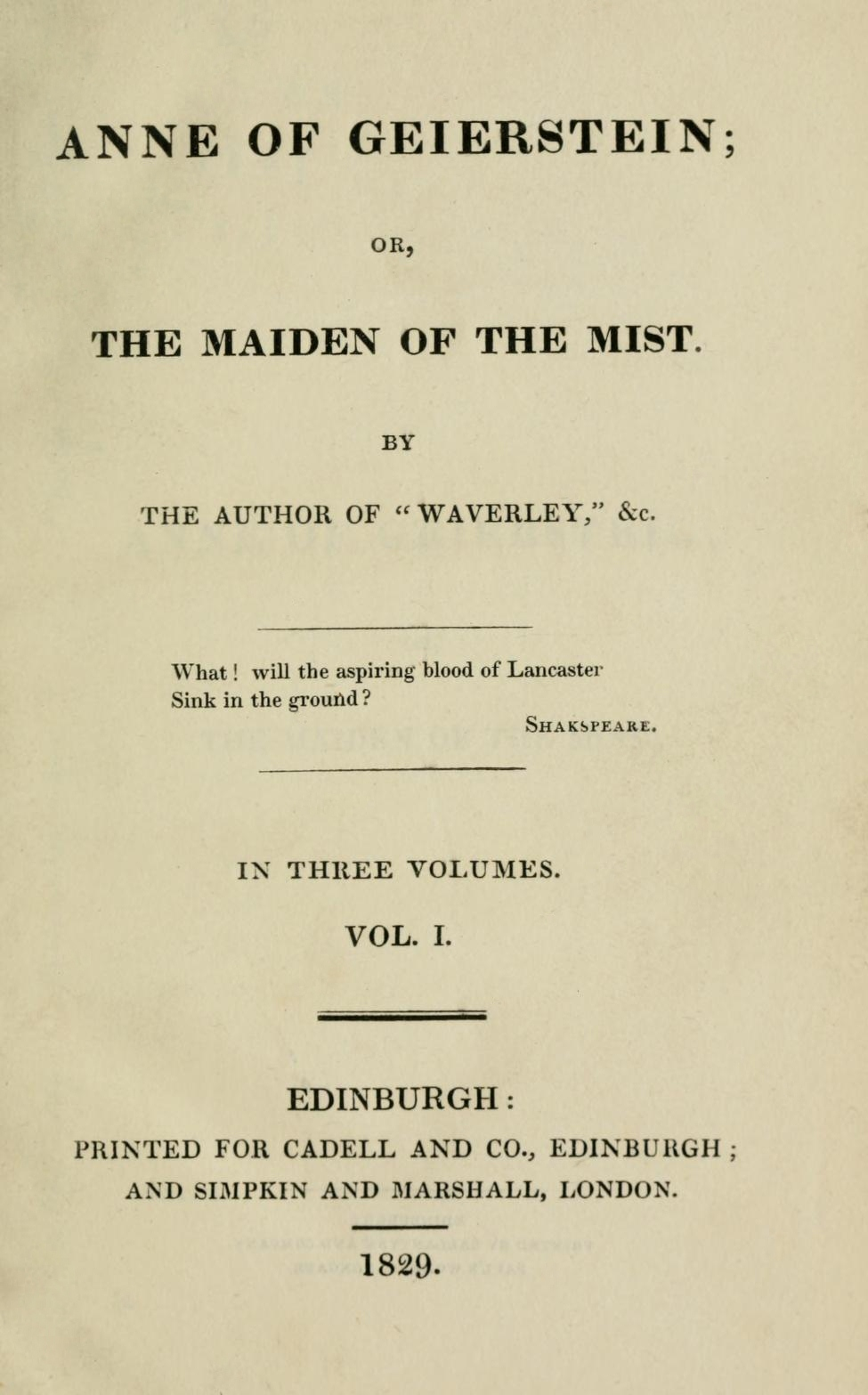
- First edition title page.
- Author: Sir Walter Scott
- Language: English
- Series: Waverley Novels
- Genre: Historical novel
- Publisher: Cadell and Co. (Edinburgh); Simpkin and Marshall (London)
- Publication date: 1829
- Publication place: Scotland
- Media type: Print
- Pages: 403 (Edinburgh Edition, 2000)
- Preceded by: The Fair Maid of Perth
- Followed by: Count Robert of Paris

Anne of Geierstein, or The Maiden of the Mist is the 24th of the Waverley novels by Sir Walter Scott, published in 1829. It is set in Central Europe, mainly in Switzerland, shortly after the Yorkist victory at the Battle of Tewkesbury (1471). It covers the period of Swiss involvement in the Burgundian Wars, the main action ending with the Burgundian defeat at the Battle of Nancy at the beginning of 1477.

== Composition and sources ==
In May 1823, when Scott had just finished Quentin Durward he expressed his intention to 'try in a continuation' the deaths of Charles of Burgundy & Louis XI. Five years later he began Anne of Geierstein, which ends with Charles's death at the battle of Nancy and Louis in the background picking up the territorial spoils. The novel was written between September 1828 and April 1829.

Scott was able to draw on his historical sources for Quentin Durward, notably the Mémoires of Philippe de Comines. He also made use of modern studies of Switzerland, Provence, and the Secret Tribunal, of the recently published history of the Dukes of Burgundy by Barante, and of manuscript material deriving from continental journeys by his friend James Skene of Rubislaw. For Margaret of Anjou and King René, Scott largely follows the Elizabethan Holinshed's Chronicles of England, Scotland, and Ireland.

== Editions ==
The first edition was published in three volumes in Edinburgh by Cadell and Co. on 20 May 1829, and in London by Simpkin and Marshall on the 25th. The print run was probably 8000 or 8500 and the price was one and a half guineas (£1 11s 6d or £1.57½). Scott revised the text, concentrating on the earlier part of the novel, and provided it with an introduction and notes for the 'Magnum' edition where it appeared as Volumes 44 and 45 in January and February 1833, after his death.

The standard modern critical edition, by J. H. Alexander, was published as Volume 22 of the Edinburgh Edition of the Waverley Novels in 2000: this is based on the first edition; the 'Magnum' material appears in Volume 25b.

== Plot introduction ==
Two exiled Lancastrians are on a secret mission to the court of Charles the Bold, Duke of Burgundy, hoping to gain his help in regaining the English crown from the Yorkist Edward IV. The two Englishmen get into difficulties in the Swiss mountains. They meet Countess Anne and her family, who are involved in the politics of the newly independent Swiss Confederation and plan to confront Charles with complaints about his conduct towards the Swiss nation. The two groups decide to travel together. Anne may have inherited magical skills from her grandmother, enabling her to perform feats which defy explanation. The travellers also encounter a shadowy organization known as the Vehmgericht or Secret Tribunal.

== Plot summary ==
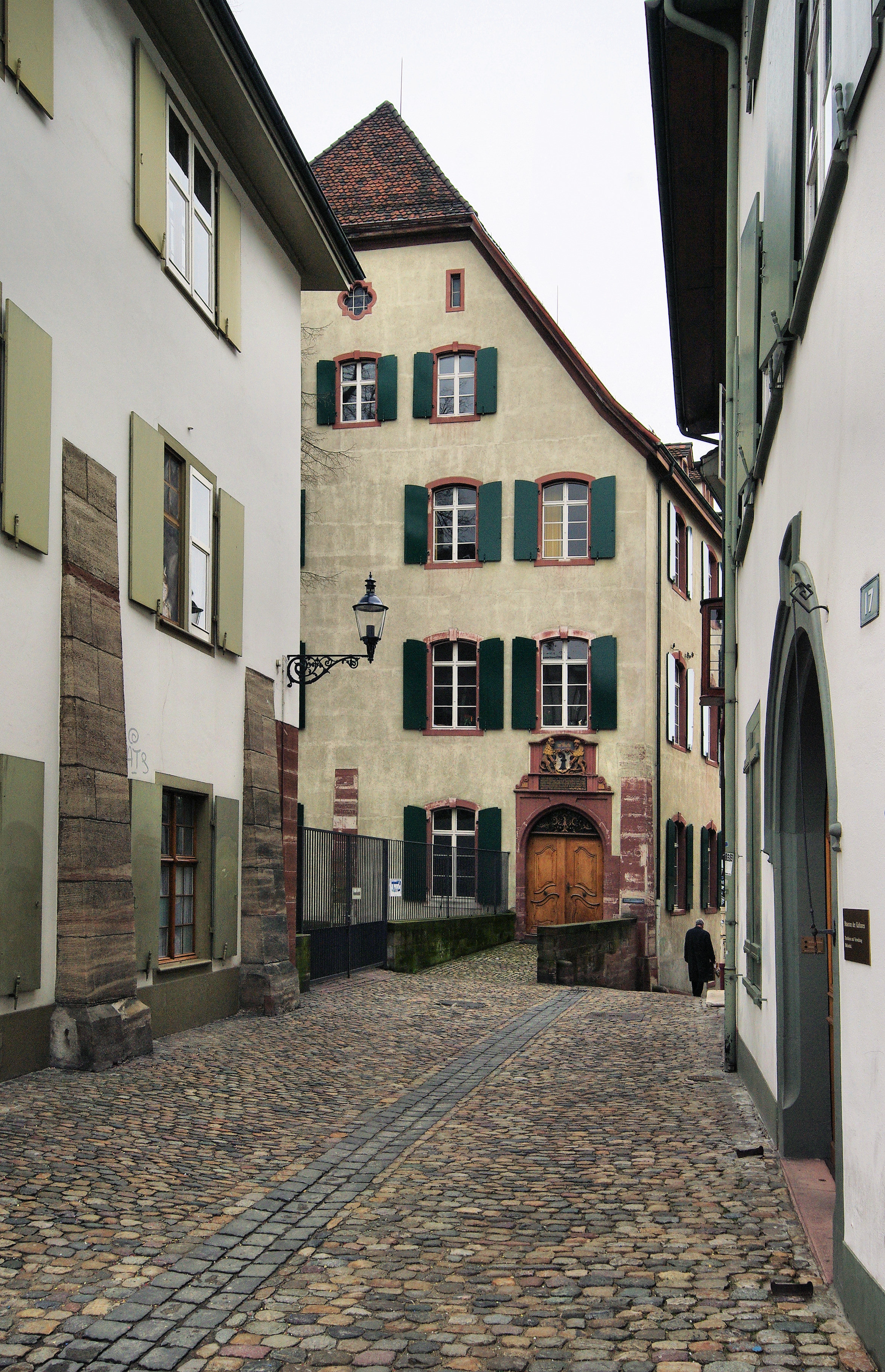
Basel

As the merchant John Philipson and his son Arthur were travelling towards Basel they were overtaken by a storm, and found themselves at the edge of a precipice caused by a recent earthquake. Arthur was making his way towards a tower indicated by their guide Antonio, when he was rescued from imminent danger by Anne, who conducted him to her uncle Biederman's mountain home. His father had already been brought there to safety by Biederman and his sons. During their evening games Rudolph, who had joined in them, became jealous of the young Englishman's skill with the bow, and challenged him; but they were overheard by Anne, and the duel was interrupted. The travellers were invited to continue their journey in company with a deputation of Switzers, commissioned to remonstrate with Charles the Bold respecting the exactions of Hagenbach; and the magistrates of Basel having declined to let them enter the city, they took shelter in the ruins of a castle. During his share in the night watches, Arthur fancied that he saw an apparition of Anne, and was encouraged in his belief by Rudolph, who narrated her family history, which implied that her ancestors had dealings with supernatural beings. Hoping to prevent a conflict on his account between the Swiss and the duke's steward, the merchant arranged that he and his son should precede them; but on reaching the Burgundian citadel they were imprisoned by the governor in separate dungeons. Arthur, however, was released by Anne with the assistance of a priest, and his father by Biederman, a body of Swiss youths having entered the town and incited the citizens to execute Hagenbach, just as he was intending to slaughter the deputation, whom he had treacherously admitted. A valuable necklace which had been taken from the merchant was restored to him by Sigismund, and the deputies having decided to persist in seeking an interview with the duke, the Englishman undertook to represent their cause favourably to him.

On their way to Charles's headquarters father and son were overtaken by Anne disguised as a lady of rank, and, acting on her whispered advice to Arthur, they continued their journey by different roads. The elder fell in with a mysterious priest who provided him with a guide to the "Golden Fleece," where he was lowered from his bedroom to appear before a meeting of the Vehmic court or holy tribunal, and warned against speaking of their secret powers. The younger was met and conducted by Annette to a castle, where he spent the evening with his lady-love, and travelled with her the next day to rejoin his father at Strassburg. In the cathedral there they met Margaret of Anjou, who recognised Philipson as John de Vere, 13th Earl of Oxford, a faithful adherent of the house of Lancaster, and planned with him an appeal to the duke for aid against the Yorkists. On reaching Charles's camp the earl was welcomed as an old companion in arms, and obtained a promise of the help he sought, on condition that Provence be ceded to Burgundy. Arthur was despatched to Aix-en-Provence to urge Margaret to persuade her father accordingly, while the earl accompanied his host to an interview with his burghers and the Swiss deputies.

King René of Anjou's preference for the society of troubadours and frivolous amusements had driven his daughter to take refuge in a convent. On hearing from Arthur, however, the result of the earl's mission to the duke, she returned to the palace, and had induced her father to sign away his kingdom, when his grandson Ferrand arrived with the news of the rout of the Burgundian army at Neuchâtel, and Arthur learned from his squire, Sigismund, that he had not seen Anne's spectre but herself during his night-watch, and that the priest he had met more than once was her father, the Count Albert of Geierstein. The same evening Queen Margaret died in her chair of state; and all the earl's prospects for England being thwarted, he occupied himself in arranging a treaty between her father and the King of France. He was still in Provence when he was summoned to rouse the duke from a fit of melancholy, caused by the Swiss having again defeated him. After raising fresh troops, Charles decided to wrest Nancy from the young Duke of Lorraine, and during the siege Arthur received another challenge from Rudolph. The rivals met, and, having killed the Bernese, the young Englishman obtained Count Albert's consent to his marriage with Anne, with strict injunctions to warn the duke that the Secret Tribunal had decreed his death. On the same night, the Swiss won their decisive victory at Nancy, establishing their independence. Charles was slain in the battle, his naked and disfigured body only discovered some days afterward frozen into the nearby river. His face had been so badly mutilated by wild animals that his physician was only able to identify him by his long fingernails and the old battle scars on his body. Being still an exile, the earl accepted the patriot Biederman's invitation to reside with his countess at Geierstein, until the battle of Bosworth placed Henry VII on the throne, when Arthur and his wife attracted as much admiration at the English Court as they had gained among their Swiss neighbours.

== Characters ==
Principal characters in bold

- **John Philipson**, an English merchant, afterwards John de Vere, 13th Earl of Oxford
- **Arthur**, his son
- Antonio, their young Swiss guide
- Arnold Biederman, a magistrate of Unterwalden
- His three oldest sons: Rudiger, Ernest, and **Sigismond**
- **Anne of Geierstein**, his niece
- Count Albert of Geierstein, Anne's father (appearing as the Black Priest of Saint Paul's etc.)
- Ital Schrekenwald, Albert's steward
- **Rudolph Donnerhugel**, a Bernese gallant
- Swiss deputies: Nicholas Bonstetten (Schwyz), Melchoir Sturmthal (Berne), and Adam Zimmerman (Soleure)
- **Charles the Bold**, Duke of Burgundy
- Lord of Contay, his councillor
- Archibald Hagenbach, Governor of La Ferette
- Kilian, his steward
- Francis Steinernherz, executioner at La Ferette
- Dannischemend, a Persian sage
- Hermione, his daughter
- Brother Bartholomew, apparently a palmer
- John Mengs, landlord of the 'Golden Fleece'
- Margaret of Anjou, widow of Henry VI
- King René of Provence, her father
- Ferrand de Vaudemont, Duke of Lorraine, his grandson (appearing as the Blue Cavalier)
- Thiebault, a Provençal
- Count Campo Basso, commander of Italian mercenaries
- Colvin, a Burgundian cannoneer

== Chapter summary ==
Volume One

Ch. 1: John Philipson and his son Arthur, passing as merchants, and their Swiss guide lose their way in the mountains between Lucerne and Basel and are impeded by a landslip, but they catch sight of the castle of Geierstein.

Ch. 2: Arthur attempts to reach the castle but gets into difficulties and is helped to safety by Anne.

Ch. 3: Arthur and his father are reunited at Geierstein, where Anne's uncle Arnold Biederman welcomes them. Rudolph Donnerhugel brings a request for Arnold to join a Bernese delegation to the Duke of Burgundy seeking redress for attacks on Swiss commercial activities, and Philipson arranges to travel with them.

Ch. 4: Arthur wins an archery competition, prompting Rudolph to challenge him to a duel.

Ch. 5: Arnold tells Philipson how, unimpressed by the prestige of rank, he had agreed that his younger brother Albert should succeed as Count of Geierstein, and how after entrusting his daughter Anne to him for upwards of seven years Albert has now asked for her return.

Ch. 6: The duel between Arthur and Rudolph is interrupted by Arnold, alerted by Anne.

Ch. 7: The deputation assembles at Geierstein and makes its way to Basel.

Ch. 8: The deputation is refused entry to Basel for fear of Burgundian reprisals, but it is accommodated at a neighbouring pleasure-house.

Ch. 9: Arthur pities Anne when she shows signs of distress; mounting night guard at the pleasure-house he thinks he sees her walking into the forest.

Ch. 10: On patrol with Rudolph, Arthur thinks he sees Anne again, and Rudolph says there are strange stories afloat about her before introducing him to his associates, who will intervene if the Philipsons are mistreated by the Burgundian governor Hagenbach at La Ferette.

Ch. 11: Donnerhugel's Narrative: Rudolph tells Arthur the story of the supernatural origin of Anne's grandmother, Hermione of Arnheim.

Ch. 12: One of Arnold's sons, Sigismond, tells Rudolph and Arthur he has seen Anne returning from the forest. The Philipsons agree to travel separately from the delegation to lessen the danger at La Ferette.

Volume Two

Ch. 1 (13): Hagenbach and his squire Kilian prepare to plunder the Philipsons, but the influential Black Priest of Saint Paul's refuses to sanction this crime.

Ch. 2 (14): Hagenbach takes from Philipson a packet addressed to the Duke of Burgundy which he finds to contain a valuable diamond necklace. He commits the Philipsons to Kilian and the executioner Steinernherz.

Ch. 3 (15): Freed from prison by Anne and the Black Priest, Arthur appeals for help to Rudolph and then to Arnold.

Ch. 4 (16): The Swiss take La Ferette, and Hagenbach is executed. Sigismond restores to Philipson the necklace, which he has retrieved from Steinernherz.

Ch. 5 (17): As the Philipsons pursue their journey Anne (lightly disguised) warns Arthur that they face imminent danger under the guidance of Brother Bartholomew, and they agree to take separate routes.

Ch. 6 (18): The Black Priest sends Bartholomew packing and travels on with Philipson.

Ch. 7 (19): Philipson arranges to stay the night at a village inn recommend by the Black Priest, whose entry puts a sudden stop to the revelry of the guests.

Ch. 8 (20): At an underground meeting of the Secret Tribunal, Philipson is charged with having defamed it, but is acquitted on his appeal to the presiding Judge (the Black Priest).

Ch. 9 (21): [the narrative retrogrades] Annette Veilchen, Anne's attendant, conducts Arthur to Arnheim castle, where she presses his claims on her mistress.

Ch. 10 (22): In discussion Anne clears up the mysteries of her birth and conduct, and Arthur informs her of his noble status and current mission.

Volume Three

Ch. 1 (23): Warned by Albert's steward Schreckenwald that his soldiers have mutinied, Anne and Arthur leave for Strasburg where they split up.

Ch. 2 (24): Reunited, the Philipsons (revealed to be the Earl of Oxford and his son) encounter Margaret of Anjou in Strasburg Cathedral, where they agree to put to Charles of Burgundy her proposal to persuade her father King René to cede Provence to the Duke in return for his support for the Lancastrian cause.

Ch. 3 (25): At the Burgundian camp outside Dijon, Oxford secures Charles's agreement to Margaret's proposal, though René will also be required to disown his grandson Ferrand de Vaudemont. But first, Charles says, he will put down the Swiss, prompting Philipson to plead for their delegation's lives.

Ch. 4 (26): Charles reluctantly tells Oxford that he will hear the Swiss delegates.

Ch. 5 (27): Arthur leaves for Provence to convey the proposed agreement to René. After Charles's entry into Dijon, the Estates reject his demand for new taxation to fund his military schemes.

Ch. 6 (28): Charles rejects the Swiss overture and receives news of a treaty between Edward IV of England and Louis XI of France.

Ch. 7 (29): As they journey to Provence, Arthur's guide Thiebault provides information about the troubadours and King René.

Ch. 8 (30): After an encounter at Aix with René, by whom he is unimpressed, Arthur climbs to the monastery of Sainte Victoire to meet Margaret, who is now uncertain about her earlier proposal.

Ch. 9 (31): The next morning Margaret resolves to proceed with her proposal, and after three days spent in penitential exercise returns to Aix, telling Arthur that an unreliable Carmelite friar, who had mistakenly been entrusted with details of the proposed cession, had left the monastery without notice.

Ch. 10 (32): René abdicates, but refuses to disown Ferrand, who arrives with news of the defeat of the Burgundians at Granson. Sigismond gives Arthur an account of the battle and reveals that the Black Priest and the Carmelite were both Albert in disguise. Margaret tells Arthur she is giving up and expires.

Ch. 11 (33): After Margaret's funeral, Oxford helps to arrange the transfer of Provence to Louis.

Ch. 12 (34): The Burgundian cannoneer Colvin gives Oxford and his son an account of a second Burgundian defeat, at Murten, and of Charles's subsequent depression. They go to La Riviere, where Oxford revives the Duke's spirits.

Ch. 13 (35): The Burgundian forces arrive at Nancy, where Arthur kills Rudolph in single combat and is promised Anne's hand by Albert.

Ch. 14 (36): Fleeing from the victorious Swiss forces, Oxford and his son come across the corpses of Charles, Albert, and Schreckenwald. Sigismond takes the two of them into safe custody. Anne and Arthur are married and live near Geierstein until Arnold's death in 1482. Oxford and his son then re-enter the political arena and play a prominent part in the defeat of the last Yorkist king Richard III at Bosworth in 1485, using the necklace bequeathed to them by Margaret for funds to levy troops.

== Reception ==
Anne of Geierstein met with an exceptionally favourable reception from its reviewers. Most of them were happy to detect no signs of declining powers, or of exhaustion in subject matter. The opening Alpine description attracted almost universal praise (The Westminster Review was alone in finding it exaggerated and improbable), as did the variety of incident throughout. Of the characters Arnold Biederman and Charles of Burgundy were considered particularly striking. Dissentient voices or comments found the relationship between history and plot unbalanced, 'not a novel but an ancient chronicle, with a love story worked in upon it' as The Examiner put it. The same critic joined two other unfavourably disposed colleagues in The Athenaeum and The Edinburgh Literary Gazette in judging most of the characters weak.

== Influences ==
Anne of Geierstein is largely responsible for the adoption of the name 'Wars of the Roses' for the medieval English civil disturbances.

In 1913, an American writer commented:

There can be little doubt that much of the modern superstition regarding the supposed unlucky quality of the opal owes its origin to a careless reading of Sir Walter Scott's novel, Anne of Geierstein. The wonderful tale therein related of the Lady Hermione, a sort of enchanted princess, who came no one knew whence and always wore a dazzling opal in her hair, contains nothing to indicate that Scott really meant to represent the opal as unlucky. [...] when a few drops of holy water were sprinkled over it, they quenched its radiance. Hermione fell into a swoon, was carried to her chamber, and the next day nothing but a small heap of ashes remained on the bed whereon she had been laid. The spell was broken and the enchantment dissolved. All that can have determined the selection of the opal rather than any other precious stone is the fact of its wonderful play of color and its sensitiveness to moisture.

There is in fact little evidence that the superstition was common before the 1850s. A popular gift book of the 1840s was entitled The Opal, which would seem an unlikely title if the notion of the opal's unluckiness were well established. In 1875, less than fifty years after the publication of Scott's novel, Sir Henry Ponsonby felt compelled to write to Notes and Queries to ask for the foundation of the superstition, and received several different answers, none of which mention Anne of Geierstein. A brief assertion of such a connection is made by Sir John Piggot in an earlier issue, but it is hedged with a quotation from the gemmologist Charles Barbot (who ascribes it to the influence of Robert le Diable) and the scholars responding to Queen Victoria's secretary do not refer to it.

== Adaptations ==
Between 1942 and 1944 the story was adapted into a newspaper comic strip by Rodolphe and Odette Vincent.
