= Castle Dangerous =

1831 novel by Walter Scott

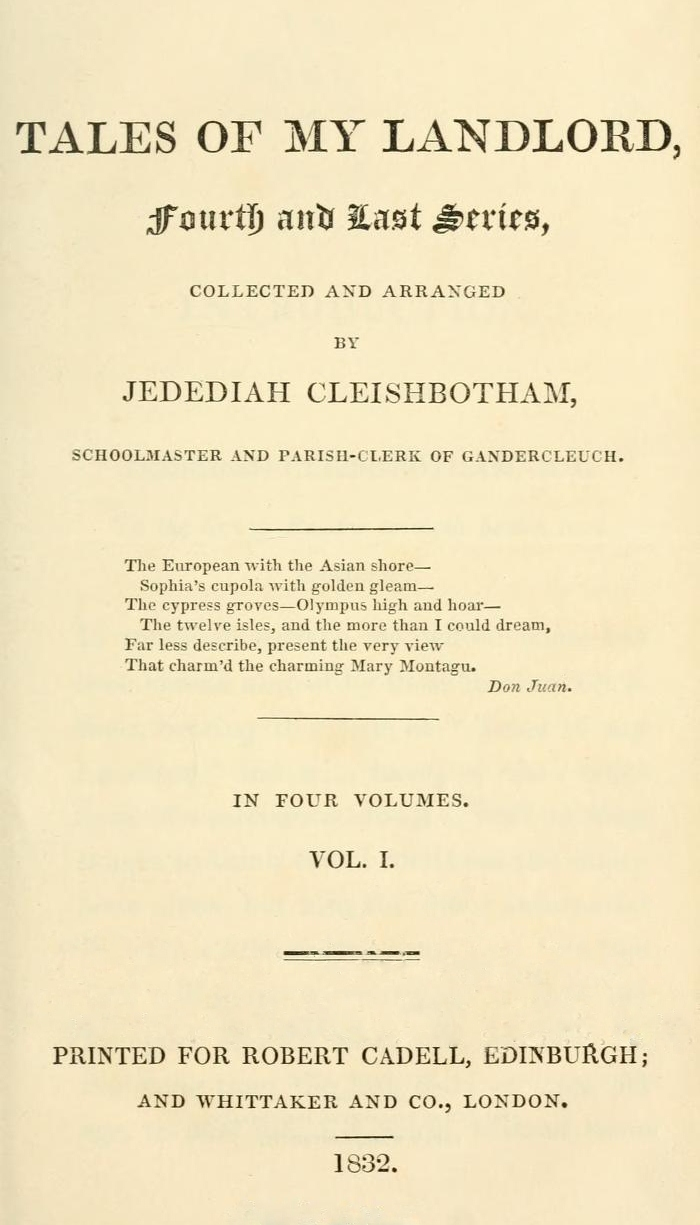
- Author: Sir Walter Scott
- Language: English, Lowland Scots
- Series: Tales of My Landlord (4th series); Waverley Novels
- Genre: Historical novel
- Publisher: Robert Cadell (Edinburgh); Whittaker and Co. (London)
- Publication date: 1832 (1 December 1831)
- Publication place: Scotland
- Media type: Print
- Pages: 190 (Edinburgh Edition, 2006)
- Preceded by: Count Robert of Paris

Castle Dangerous (1831) was the last of Walter Scott's Waverley novels. It is part of Tales of My Landlord, 4th series, with Count Robert of Paris. The castle of the title is Douglas Castle in Lanarkshire, and the action, based on an episode in The Brus by John Barbour, is set in March 1307 against the background of the First War of Scottish Independence.

== Composition and sources ==
Scott wrote Castle Dangerous, using William Laidlaw as his amanuensis, in late June, July, and August 1831 during a break in his composition of Count Robert of Paris following objections raised by James Ballantyne and Robert Cadell to Brenhilda's pregnancy and combat with Anna Comnena. He had written about a third of a volume by 3 July (though he thought he had done much more) and, taking time off to visit the scene of the novel at Douglas, actually completed the volume on 1 August. There were further interruptions that month, when his mind was confused, and when Laidlaw was ill, but the work was finished around 9 September. There was not enough material for a complete second volume, though, so Scott was happy to accept the suggestion by J. G. Lockhart that the two novels be published together in four volumes as a fourth series of Tales of my Landlord. After Scott had left for the Mediterranean on 29 October, Cadell and Lockhart radically revised his text without any further authorial input, completing the work in mid-November.

Although Scott was very familiar with the standard sources for Scottish medieval history, for Castle Douglas he used two sources almost exclusively: the narrative poem The Bruce by John Barbour (d. 1395), and The History of the Houses of Douglas and Angus (1644; reissued 1648) by David Hume of Godscroft. As usual, he makes chronological adjustments for his fictional purposes.

== Editions ==
Tales of my Landlord, Fourth and Last Series, dated 1832, was published on 1 December 1831 by Robert Cadell in Edinburgh and Whittaker and Co. in London. The print run was 5000 and the price two guineas (£2 2s or £2.10). Scott may have had some input into the text of the Magnum edition of the fourth series of Tales of my Landlord, which appeared posthumously as Volumes 47, 47, and 48 (part) in March, April, and May 1833: he sent Lockhart a list of errata from Naples on 16 February 1832, but it has not survived, and in any case Scott's accompanying letter refers only to Count Robert of Paris. He also provided an Introduction for Castle Dangerous (but apparently none for Count Robert).

The standard modern edition of Castle Dangerous, by J. H. Alexander, was published as Volume 23b of the Edinburgh Edition of the Waverley Novels in 2006: this is based on the first edition, with extensive emendations mainly from the surviving manuscript and proofs, designed to restore as much of Scott's work as possible.

== Plot introduction ==
The story is set in Lanarkshire in March 1307. Lady Augusta has promised to marry Sir John de Walton provided that he can maintain possession of the castle he has captured for a year and a day. Regretting her promise, she resolves to travel in disguise to the castle to find some method of subversion.

The story had already been told in brief in his essay on 'Chivalry' for the Encyclopaedia Britannica in 1818, and in spite his failing health and a recent decline in popularity due to his politics, Scott made an effort to visit the area to collect information and adjust descriptions. Pained by James Ballantyne's criticisms of Count Robert of Paris, and by his unexpected disagreement on the subject of the recent Reform Bill, Scott did not discuss the book with him.

Only one ruined tower remains of Douglas Castle, and that dates from the 17th century. Scott called this area "Douglasdale"

== Plot summary ==
During the struggle for the Scottish crown between Edward I and Robert Bruce, the stronghold of his adherent Sir James Douglas, known as Castle Dangerous, has been taken by the English, and Lady Augusta has promised her hand and fortune to its new governor, Sir John de Walton, on condition that he holds it for a year and a day.

Anxious to curtail this period, she determines to make her way thither, accompanied by her father's minstrel, Bertram, disguised as his son, and they are within three miles of their destination, when fatigue compels them to seek shelter at Tom Dickson's farm. Two English archers, who are quartered there, insist that the youth (Lady Augusta in disguise) should be left at the neighbouring convent of St Bride's, until Bertram satisfies Sir John as to the object of their journey, and this arrangement is approved of by Sir Aymer de Valance, the deputy governor, who arrives to visit the outpost. As they proceed together towards the castle, the minstrel entertains the young knight with some curious legends respecting it, including the supernatural preservation of an ancient lay relating to the house of Douglas, and the future fate of the British kingdom generally. De Valance would pass the stranger into the stronghold as a visitor at once; but the old archer Gilbert Greenleaf detains him in the guard room until the arrival of the governor, who, in the hearing of Fabian, Sir Aymer's squire, expresses his disapproval of his deputy's imprudence, and thus the seeds of disagreement are sown between them.

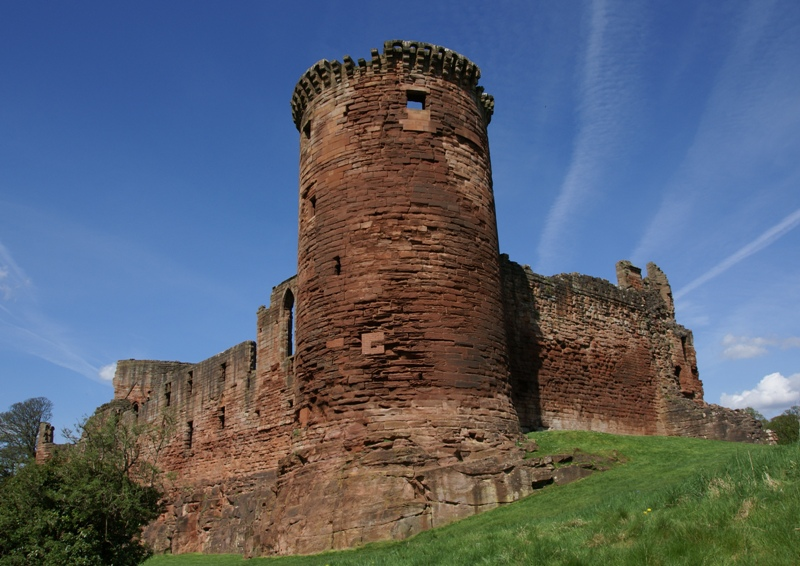
Part of Bothwell Castle, a similar castle also in South Lanarkshire

Sir John, however, wishes to be indulgent to his young officers, and accordingly arranges a hunting party, in which the Scottish vassals in the neighbourhood are invited to join; but, at the mid-day repast, a forester named Turnbull behaves so rudely to the governor that he orders him to be secured, when he suddenly plunges into a ravine and disappears. The young knight takes fresh offence at being ordered to withdraw the archers from the sport to reinforce the garrison, and appeals to his uncle, the Earl of Pembroke, who, instead of taking his part, writes him a sharp reproof. He then opposes the governor's wish that the minstrel should terminate his visit, which induces Sir John to threaten Bertram with torture unless he instantly reveals his purpose in coming to the castle. The minstrel declines to do so without his son's permission; and, the Abbot having pleaded for delay on account of the boy's delicate health, Sir Aymer is ordered to meet a detachment at an outpost, and then to bring him to the castle to be examined. As he passes through the town he encounters a mounted warrior in full armour, whom neither the inhabitants nor his followers will admit to having seen. The old sexton, however, declares that the spirits of the deceased knights of Douglas cannot rest in their graves while the English are at enmity with their descendants. On reaching the convent, De Valence rouses Father Jerome, and insists that the youth (Lady Augusta) should at once accompany him. He is, however, allowed to return to his bed till daybreak, and upon the door of his room being then forced open, it is empty. During the night, Sister Ursula, who has hidden in the room, elicits Lady Augusta's secret, which she has already guessed, and, having narrated the circumstances under which she had entered the convent without taking the vows, they escape through a concealed postern and find a guide waiting for them with horses. A scroll which his lady-love had left behind her explains matters to Sir John, who, in his despair, is comforted by the sympathy of his lieutenant; and the faithful minstrel, having been admitted to their confidence, steps are at once taken to track the fugitives.

Having reached a thicket, Sister Ursula (whose original name is Lady Margaret) disappears to join her friends, and Lady Augusta is escorted, first by the celebrated Douglas, and then by Turnbull, to a spot where they meet Sir John, to whom the forester delivers a message with which he refuses to comply, and mortally wounds the man when he attempts to lead the lady away. But Sir James is at hand, and the two knights fight until summoned by the church bells to Palm Sunday service, at which the old bishop officiates in the presence of an excited assemblage of armed English and Scotch warriors eager to attack each other. Bertram meets Lady Augusta in the churchyard, and is arranging for her safety, when De Walton and The Douglas renew their combat, and an encounter also takes place between De Valence and Sir Malcolm Fleming, Lady Margaret's lover. The life of Sir Malcolm is saved by the intercession of Lady Margaret, and Sir John surrenders his sword and governorship on the arrival of a messenger with the intelligence that an English force, commanded by the Earl of Pembroke, which was advancing to prevent an anticipated attack on the castle, has been utterly defeated by Bruce and his followers. He and his troops, however, are allowed to retire with their arms, Sir James Douglas having chivalrously transferred his claim upon her lover to the Lady Augusta of Berkeley, who, in return for his courtesy, decorates the brave Scotchman with a chain of brilliants which were won in battle by her ancestor.

== Characters ==
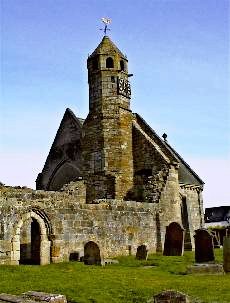
St Bride's Kirk, where Douglas is buried

Principal characters in bold

- **Bertram**, an English minstrel
- **Augustine**, his son, actually **Lady Augusta of Berkeley**
- Tom Dickson of Hazelside, a vassal of the Douglas estate
- Charles Dickson, his son
- **Sir John de Walton**, Governor of Castle Dangerous
- **Sir Aymer de Valence**, deputy Governor
- Fabian Harbothel, his squire
- Gilbert Greenleaf, an old archer
- Abbot Jerome, of St Bride's convent
- **Sister Ursula**, afterwards **Lady Margaret** de Hautville
- **Sir Malcolm Fleming**, her lover
- Michael Turnbull, a border forester
- Lazarus Powheid, sexton of Douglas Kirk
- The Knight of the Tomb, **Sir James Douglas**
- The Bishop of Glasgow
- The Earl of Pembroke

== Chapter summary ==
Volume One

Ch. 1: Arriving in Douglasdale, Bertram and Augustine agree to stop with Tom Dickson at Hazelside.

Ch. 2: Arriving at Hazelside, Bertram and Augustine are questioned by the garrison there. It is agreed that Augustine should stay at the nearby convent. Sir Aymer de Valence arrives and examines Bertram courteously.

Ch. 3: On the way to Douglas, Bertram and Aymer discuss the relationship between military exploits and minstrelsy.

Ch. 4: Aymer tells Bertram the story of the Douglas Larder, as the minstrel reflects on military inhumanity and his desire for peace in Britain.

Ch. 5: Bertram tells Aymer of his desire to discover a manuscript produced by Thomas the Rhymer, encountered in the spirit by the minstrel Hugo Hugonet. Aymer admits Bertram into Douglas Castle in spite of the misgivings of Gilbert Greenleaf, but he begins to have doubts and says that the approval of Sir John de Walton will be required. Walton arrives, and Aymer's squire Fabian overhears Greenleaf warning him about the lad's influence: he conveys a distorted version of these remarks to his master, setting in train an awkwardness between Aymer and Walton.

Ch. 6: Walton proposes a hunting relaxation for the garrison. Aymer is uncharmed, but preparations go ahead.

Ch. 7: At the hunting breakfast, the forester Michael Turnbull defies Walton and makes his escape with great agility.

Ch. 8: The relationship between Aymer and Walton deteriorates further. Aymer argues against interrogating Bertram under torture. Greenleaf maintains to Walton that the minstrel is a dubious character. Bertram has found fragments of the Rhymer's manuscript: Walton questions him, without torture, and allows him to write to Augustine for permission to divulge the purpose of their visit.

Ch. 9: Walton takes Bertram's letter to the convent, but Augustine declines to answer it till noon the next day. Returning to the castle, Walton instructs Aymer to go with a detachment to Hazelside and wait for Augustine to deliver himself up. In the town, Aymer encounters a strange horseman bearing the Douglas arms. He seeks out the sexton Lazarus Powheid, who maintains that the spirits of the old Douglasses cannot rest in peace following the dishonouring of their monuments and the downfall of their house. Aymer directs that he be taken before Walton.

Ch. 10: After Aymer has had discussions with Abbot Jerome and Augustine, the young man is guarded in preparation for his removal to the castle, but in the morning his room is discovered to be empty.

Ch. 11: [retrospective] Augustine (Augusta) and Sister Ursula (Margaret de Hautlieu) share their stories before fleeing the convent.

Volume Two

Ch. 1 (12): Aymer and Jerome react to a letter left by Augustine forgiving Aymer but rebuking Walton. Returning to the castle, Aymer tells Walton he has noted down his understanding of Augustine's secret.

Ch. 2 (13): In Bertram's cell Aymer reveals to Walton the truth about the disguised Augusta's identity and attempts to console him. They determine to seek her.

Ch. 3 (14): While the search for them goes on, Augusta and Margaret debate the best course of action. Augusta reluctantly accepts the protection of the Knight of the Tomb (Sir James Douglas).

Ch. 4 (15): Douglas guides Augusta, as if bewildering her, but assuring her of his good faith.

Ch. 5 (16): The pair meet up with Douglas's retainers, and Turnbull offers to take Augusta (on parole) to Walton, with a letter giving the terms for her freedom.

Ch. 6 (17): Turnbull and a colleague convey Augusta in a surreal manner to a forest, where they meet Walton. Turnbull negotiates with the knight, but they come to blows and Turnbull is wounded. Douglas arrives and fights Walton till a truce is agreed at Augusta's request.

Ch. 7 (18): Bertram expounds the Rhymer's prophecies to Greenleaf, and they agree to seek out the portentous location known as Bloody Sykes referred to by Thomas as having particular significance for the relationship between Douglas and the English.

Ch. 8 (19): Bertram and Greenleaf pass the spot where Douglas and Walton fought [probably Bloody Sykes]. They reach the church, where Augusta, disguised as a pilgrim, secretly identifies herself to Bertram but arouses Greenleaf's suspicions. The Bishop of Glasgow arrives for the Palm Sunday rites and tries to pacify the dying Turnbull. The Scots answer a challenge to combat by the English.

Ch. 9 (20): The Bishop's efforts to preserve peace are helped by general admiration for a reconciliation between Walton and Augusta. He tries unsuccessfully to commend the disfigured Margaret to Sir Malcolm Fleming. Douglas's attempt to divert attention from Fleming sparks a general conflict, which is narrowed down to encounters between Aymer and Fleming, and Douglas and Walton. Fleming defeats Aymer, with Margaret's help. The duel between Douglas and Walton is interrupted by news of the Earl of Pembroke's defeat at Loudon Hill. Walton surrenders the castle to Douglas, who in turn yields Augusta to him. Many months later, Fleming is reconciled with Margaret (her disfiguration skilfully minimised) after a chance encounter. The author takes his leave.

In this final chapter the Edinburgh Edition text differs substantially from that in other editions.

== Reception ==
With two exceptions, the reviews of Castle Dangerous were generally appreciative, and even enthusiastic. The knowledge that the fourth series of Tales of my Landlord was probably Scott's last publication may well have played a part in the favourable reception, and there was not much detailed criticism of the volumes, with Castle Dangerous sometimes largely or entirely passed over; but there was substantial praise for the characterisation, the local description, and the dramatic story. As for the dissenters, the Literary Test found the story more interesting than in Count Robert but was put off by the mystery and superstition, and the Monthly Review was unable to finish a work which read like a feeble and awkward imitation of the master.
