= The Black Dwarf (novel) =

1816 novel by Walter Scott

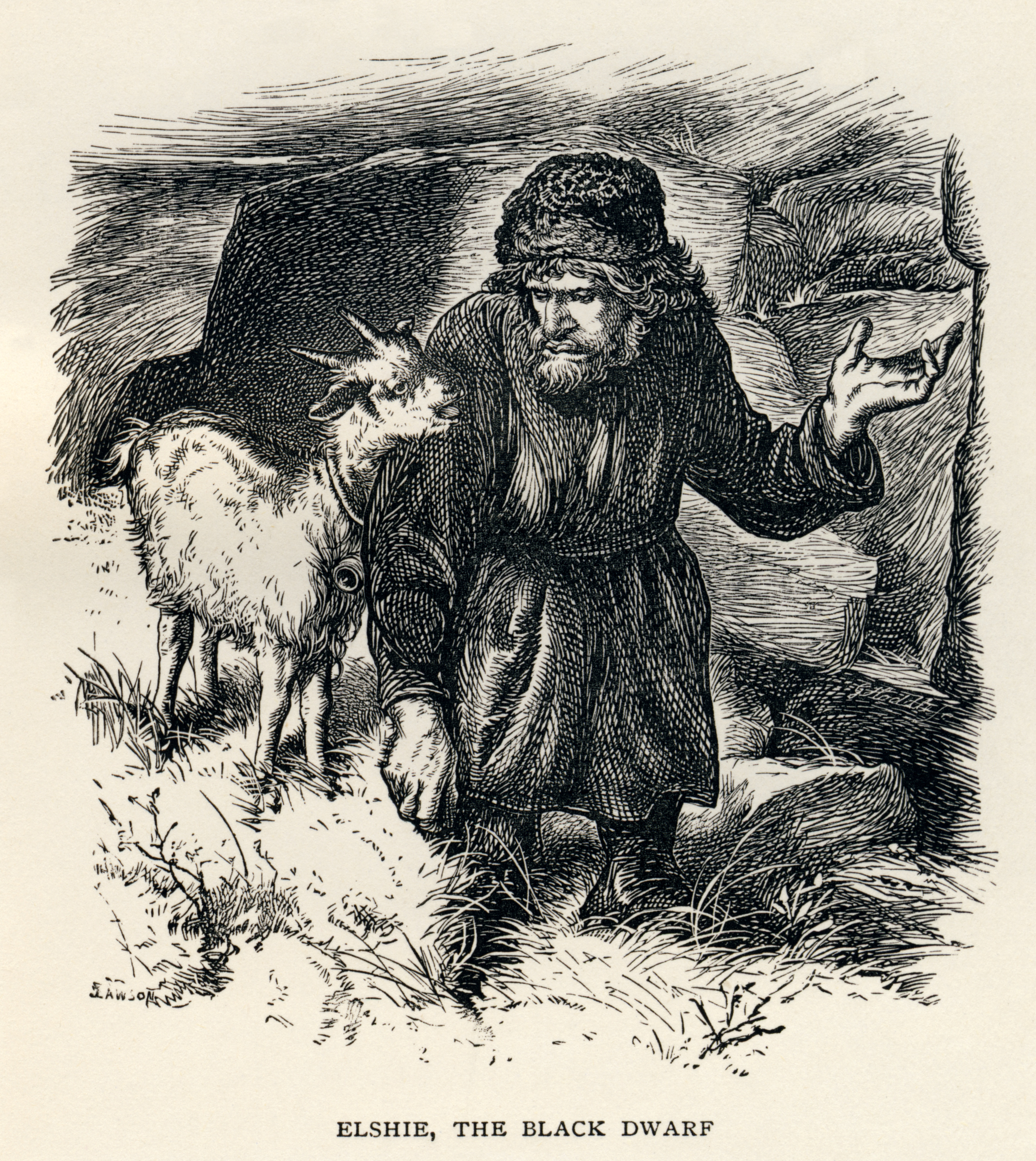
- "Elshie, the Black Dwarf", from an 1886 printing of the novel by Adam and Charles Black
- Author: Walter Scott
- Language: English, Scots
- Series: Waverley Novels; Tales of My Landlord [1st series]
- Genre: Historical novel
- Publisher: William Blackwood (Edinburgh); John Murray (London)
- Publication date: 2 December 1816
- Publication place: Scotland
- Media type: Print
- Pages: 124 (Edinburgh Edition, 1993)
- Preceded by: The Antiquary
- Followed by: The Tale of Old Mortality

One of the Waverley Novels by Walter Scott, The Black Dwarf was part of his Tales of My Landlord, 1st series (1816). It is set in 1708, in the Scottish Borders, against the background of the first uprising to be attempted by the Jacobites after the Act of Union.

== Composition and sources ==
On 30 April 1816 Scott signed a contract with William Blackwood for a four-volume work of fiction, and on 22 August James Ballantyne, Scott's printer and partner, indicated to Blackwood that it was to be entitled Tales of My Landlord which was planned to consist of four tales relating to four regions of Scotland. In the event the second tale, Old Mortality, expanded to take up the final three volumes, leaving The Black Dwarf as the only story to appear exactly as intended. It is not clear precisely when Scott began composition, but the tale was complete before the end of August.

For the historical background Scott was particularly indebted to two books: Memoirs Concerning the Affairs of Scotland by George Lockhart of Carnwath (1714), and The History of the Late Rebellion by Robert Patten (1717). He also drew extensively on the ballads he had edited in Minstrelsy of the Scottish Border (1802–03).

== Editions ==
The Black Dwarf appeared as the first volume of Tales of My Landlord, published by Blackwood's in Edinburgh on 2 December 1816 and by John Murray in London three days later. As with all the Waverley novels before 1827 publication was anonymous. The title-page indicated that the Tales were 'collected and arranged by Jedediah Cleishbotham', reinforcing the sense of a new venture moving on from the first three novels with 'the Author of Waverley' and his publishers, Archibald Constable in Edinburgh and Longman, Hurst, Rees, Orme, and Brown in London. The print run was 2000, and the price £1 8s (£1.40). Two further editions with minor changes followed in the next two months. There is no clear evidence for authorial involvement in this, or in any of the novel's subsequent appearances except for the 18mo Novels and Tales (1823) and the 'Magnum' edition. Some of the small changes to the text in 1823 are probably by Scott, but that edition was a textual dead end. In the latter part of 1828 he provided the novel with an introduction and notes, and revised the text, for the Magnum edition in which it appeared in Volume 9 in February 1830.

The standard modern edition, by P. D. Garside, was published as Volume 4a of the Edinburgh Edition of the Waverley Novels in 1993: this is based on the first edition with emendations from manuscript and the editions immediately following the initial publication; the 'Magnum' material appears in Volume 25a.

== Plot introduction ==
The story is set just after the Union of Scotland and England (1707), in the Liddesdale hills of the Scottish Borders, familiar to Scott from his work collecting ballads for Minstrelsy of the Scottish Border. Castleton and Westburnflat, named in the story, are actual places. The main character is based on David Ritchie, whom Scott met in the autumn of 1797. In the tale, the dwarf is Sir Edward Mauley, a hermit regarded by the locals as being in league with the Devil, who becomes embroiled in a complex tale of love, revenge, betrayal, Jacobite schemes and a threatened forced marriage. Scott began the novel well, "but tired of the ground I had trode so often before ... I quarrelled with my story, & bungled up a conclusion."

The introduction to The Black Dwarf attributes the work to Jedediah Cleishbotham, whom Scott had invented as a fictional editor of the Landlord series. It is here that we have the most complete view of this character.

== Plot summary ==
As Hobbie Elliot was returning over a wild moor from a day's sport, thinking of the legends he had heard of its supernatural occupants after nightfall, he was overtaken by Patrick Earnscliff, whose father had been killed in a quarrel with the laird of Ellislaw, Richard Vere. The moon suddenly revealed the figure of a human dwarf, who, on being spoken to, expressed severe misanthropy, refused their offers of assistance, and bid them begone. Hobbie invited Earnscliff to sup with his womenfolks, and pass the night at his farm, and then accompanied him next morning to confront the strange being by daylight. They collected some stones for him for constructing a hut. In later days Earnscliff supplied him with food and other necessaries. In a short time he had completed his dwelling, and became known to the neighbours, for whose ailments he prescribed, as Elshender the Recluse.

Being visited by Isabella Vere and two of her cousins/friends, he told their fortunes, and he gave Isabella a rose, with strict injunctions to bring it to him in her hour of adversity. As they rode homewards, the one cousin's conversation implied that Isabella could love young Patrick Earnscliff. Isabella denied that was possible. And her father Mr. Vere intended her to marry Sir Frederick Langley, whom she and her cousins hated. Another of the dwarf's visitors was Willie Graeme of Westburnflat, on his way to avenge an affront he had received from Hobbie Elliot. The next day Hobbie's hunting dog killed one of the dwarf's goats, angering the dwarf and he declared that retribution was at hand.

Shortly afterwards, Willie Graeme brought word that he and his companions had fired Hobbie's farm, and carried off his sweetheart, Grace Armstrong, and some cattle. On hearing this Elshie insisted that Grace should be given up uninjured and wrote out a money order to persuade them to release her and dispatched Willie Graeme to do it. Hobbie, having dispersed his neighbours in search of Grace and his cattle, went to consult Elshie, who handed him a bag of gold, which he declined, and intimated that he must seek her whom he had lost "in the west." Earnscliff and his party had tracked the cattle as far as the English border, but on finding a large English force assembling there they returned, and it was decided to attack Westburnflat's stronghold. On approaching it, a female hand, which her lover swore was Grace's, waved a signal to them from a turret, and as they were preparing a bonfire to force the door, Graeme agreed to release his prisoner, who proved to be Isabella Vere. On reaching home, however, Elliot found that Grace had been brought back, and at dawn he started off to accept the money which the dwarf had offered him to repair his homestead.

Isabel had been seized by ruffians while walking with her father, who appeared overcome with grief, declared that Earnscliff was the offender and led searches in all directions except south. The second day Mr. Vere's cousin Ralph Mareschal insisted that they search to the south. Mr Vere's suspicion seemed justified by their soon meeting his daughter returning under Earnscliff's care; but she confirmed his version of the circumstances under which he had intervened, to the evident discomfiture of her father and Sir Frederick.

At a large gathering, the same day, of the Pretender's adherents in the hall of Ellieslaw Castle, Ralph Mareschal prompted everyone to swear fidelity to supporting James VIII, the Old Pretender's cause. After that, to Mr. Vere and Sir Frederick, he produced a letter telling news that the Old Pretender's ships had been turned back. To continue, Sir Frederick insisted that his marriage with Isabella should take place before midnight. She consented, on her father's representation that his life would be forfeited if she refused, when Mr Ratcliffe, conservator of her father's bankrupt estate, persuaded her to make use of the token which Elshie had given her, and escorted her to his dwelling. Elshie told her to return home, and that he would come to prevent the marriage. Just as the ceremony was commencing in the chapel, a voice, which seemed to proceed from her mother's tomb, uttered the word "Forbear." The dwarf's real name and rank were then revealed, as well as the circumstances under which he had acquired the power of thus interfering on Isabella's behalf, while Hobbie and his friends supported Mr Ratcliffe in dispersing the would-be rebels.

The next morning Isabella learned that her father had fled, and was already halfway to the coast to flee the country. He had refused an offer of allowance from Ratcliffe, instead to rely on his daughter. The dwarf, Sir Edward, at the same time disappeared from the neighbourhood. All the Ellieslaw property, as well as the baronet's, was settled on Isabella, who soon married Earnscliff. The last chapter told the fates of the major characters.

== Characters ==
Principal characters in bold

- **Halbert "Hobbie" Elliot**, of the Heugh-foot farm
- Mrs Elliott, his grandmother
- Old Annaple, his former nurse
- John and Harry, his brothers
- Lilias, Jean, and Annot, his sisters
- **Grace Armstrong**, his cousin and fiancée
- **Patrick Earnscliff**, a young squire, laird of Earnscliff
- **Elshender, "Elshie"**, the Black Dwarf, revealed as Sir Edward Mauley
- **Richard Vere**, Laird of Ellieslaw
- **Isabella Vere**, his daughter
- **Sir Frederick Langley**, her suitor
- Lucy Ilderton, her cousin and friend, about the same age as Isabella.
- Nancy Ilderton, Lucy's younger sister
- **Willie Graeme** of Westburnflat, a freebooter
- **Hubert Ratcliffe**, conservator of Richard Vere's estate, later revealed to be the agent of Sir Edward Mauley
- **Ralph Mareschal**, Vere's kinsman

== Chapter summary ==
Introduction: Jedidiah Cleishbotham explains that Tales of my Landlord, based on stories told by the innkeeper of the Wallace Inn at Gandercleugh, were collected and arranged for publication by his assistant schoolmaster the late Peter Pattieson.

Ch. 1: A petty laird and his shepherd arrives at the Wallace Inn. Once his business is done he tells stories about the Black Dwarf which are the basis of the following narrative.

Ch. 2: Meeting on a moor, Hobbie Elliot and Patrick Earnscliff recall how Earnscliff's father had been killed in a skirmish with a party led by Richard Vere, Laird of Ellieslaw. Hobbie expresses concern whether young Earnscliff will defend his rights against neighbors, particularly Ellieslaw, who would take his property by force. He also suggests that Earnscliff is kept from taking revenge by his affection for the laird's daughter Isabella. Earnscliff denies any such affection, affirms the rule of law, and that he will defend his property. Hobbie then affirms that he and his brothers will come to Earnscliff's aid if that is needed.

Ch. 3: Hobbie and Earnscliff encounter the misanthropic Dwarf, Elshie, before arriving at Cleugh-foot to be received by Hobbie's womenfolk.

Ch. 4: The next day Earnscliff and Hobbie go back to the spot where they saw the dwarf. They help Elshie with his hut for a short time, but he displays no gratitude. A few months later, after accepting a gift of two goats, Elshie gives Earnscliff a full account of his nihilistic creed.

Ch. 5: Elshie is moved by a general offer of assistance by Isabella Vere, who encounters him with her two cousins and friends Lucy and Nancy Ilderton while hunting; he gives her a rose which she is to bring to him in time of adversity. Lucy Ilderton teases Isabella with the possibility of her marrying Earnscliff rather than the detested Sir Frederick Langley favoured by her father.

Ch. 6: Willie Graham of Westburnflat, known as the Red Reiver, tells Elshie he is about to attack Hobbie for speaking ill of him.

Ch 7: Hobbie's hunting dog kills one of Elshie's goats. Elshie, angered, declares that Hobbie will soon suffer loss. Later Westburnflat tells Elshie he and his party have sacked Cleugh-foot and abducted Hobbie's fiancée Grace: Elshie tells him to give Grace back in return for payment by 'the steward'. Hobbie finds his home ravaged, is urged to accept God's will by his grandmother, and sets out in search of Grace.

Ch. 8: Hobbie declines an offer of money from Elshie but follows up his hint and joins a party headed by Earnscliff to seek Grace at Westburnflat.

Ch. 9: Willie of Westburnflat delivers up, not Grace, but Isabella who is returned to her father at Ellieslaw.

Ch. 10: On his return to Cleugh-foot, Hobbie finds that Grace has been brought back. After discussion with the family he now accepts Elshie's money as a loan to rebuild Cleugh-foot.

Ch. 11: The narrative reverts to describe Richard Vere, who spends above his means and now must live with the representative of his lender, Hubert Ratcliffe. The narrative then describes Isabella's abduction. Vere tells his conservator Mr. Ratcliffe he believes Earnscliff is the abductor, and instigates an unsuccessful search for her as his Jacobite colleagues assemble at the castle.

Ch. 12: The next day, resuming the search, Vere meets Isabella being brought back by Earnscliff. Ratcliffe tells Vere's kinsman Ralph Mareschal, a moderate Jacobite, of his disapproval of the conspiracy.

Ch. 13: Description of the banquet hall, of people assembled to fight for the Old Pretender's cause. They are undecided and unsettled. Ralph Mareschal declares that he will leap the ditch first, and drinks a toast to that. All assembled do the same and get to work to prepare for it. Mareschal goes off with Laird Ellieslaw and Sir Frederick, and shares with them a letter telling news that the Old Pretender's fleet had been turned back. Sir Frederick threatens to leave, but Vere promises that Isabella will marry him immediately, before midnight, to induce him to remain and remain committed to the cause.

Ch. 14: Vere persuades Isabella to marry Langley, making it clear that he had arranged for her abduction to avoid, at least for a time, the awkwardness arising from her coldness towards her destined husband.

Ch. 15: Ratcliffe urges Isabella to seek Elshie's help and tells her how Elshie had been deeply affected by a close friend's marriage to his own intended (a kinswoman) during his time in prison for killing the friend's assailant during a brawl.

Ch. 16: Isabella returns the rose of Ch. 5 to Elshie who sends her back and promises to prevent the marriage.

Ch. 17: Elshie interrupts the wedding, revealing himself to be Sir Edward Mauley, and informs them that he owns all this property and will not consent that any of it go to Sir Frederick. Sir Frederick, who only sought the marriage for the money and property, abandons it and leaves the hall. Hobbie arrives with a party for himself, the King and for Elshie. In the best interests of peace they allow the remaining conspirators to disperse, except Willie of Westburnflat, who has already fled. Isabella falls at Sir Edward's feet weeping in gratitude, then collapses and is carried to her room.

Ch. 18: Ratcliffe brings Isabella a letter from her father announcing that he is going into exile and explaining matters further: in particular her father's identity as Sir Edward's friend and rival, and Ratcliffe's role as Sir Edward's agent. Hobbie and Grace are married, as are Isabella and Earnscliff. Ratcliffe once each year goes on a trip, obviously to visit Sir Edward. One day he returns and it is evident that Sir Edward has died. Ratcliffe dies in old age without revealing any information about Sir Edward's retirement or the manner of his death. The fates of Richard Vere, Willie of Westburnflat, Ralph Mareschal and Lucy Ilderton are also told.

== Reception ==
The overall title Tales of my Landlord and the Introduction by Jedidiah Cleishbotham found no favour with the reviewers. The Black Dwarf was generally judged much inferior to Old Mortality, its central character a failure, and its story slight and hastily concluded. Nevertheless a master hand was discerned in the details of some of the supporting characters and the depiction of Border manners. Three reviews were predominantly favourable (The British Review, The Edinburgh Review, and The New Monthly Magazine), the last even judging it much the better and more original of the two stories for characters and story.
