= Jedediah Cleishbotham =

Literary character by Sir Walter Scott

Jedediah Cleishbotham is an imaginary editor in Walter Scott's Tales of My Landlord. According to Scott, he is a "Schoolmaster and Parish-clerk of Gandercleugh." Scott claimed that he had sold the stories to the publishers, and that they had been compiled by fellow schoolmaster Peter Pattieson from tales collected from the landlord of the Wallace Inn at Gandercleugh. For more information, see the introduction to The Black Dwarf by Scott.

== See also ==
- Dryasdust, another meta-character in Scott
