= Waverley novels =

1814–1831 series by Sir Walter Scott

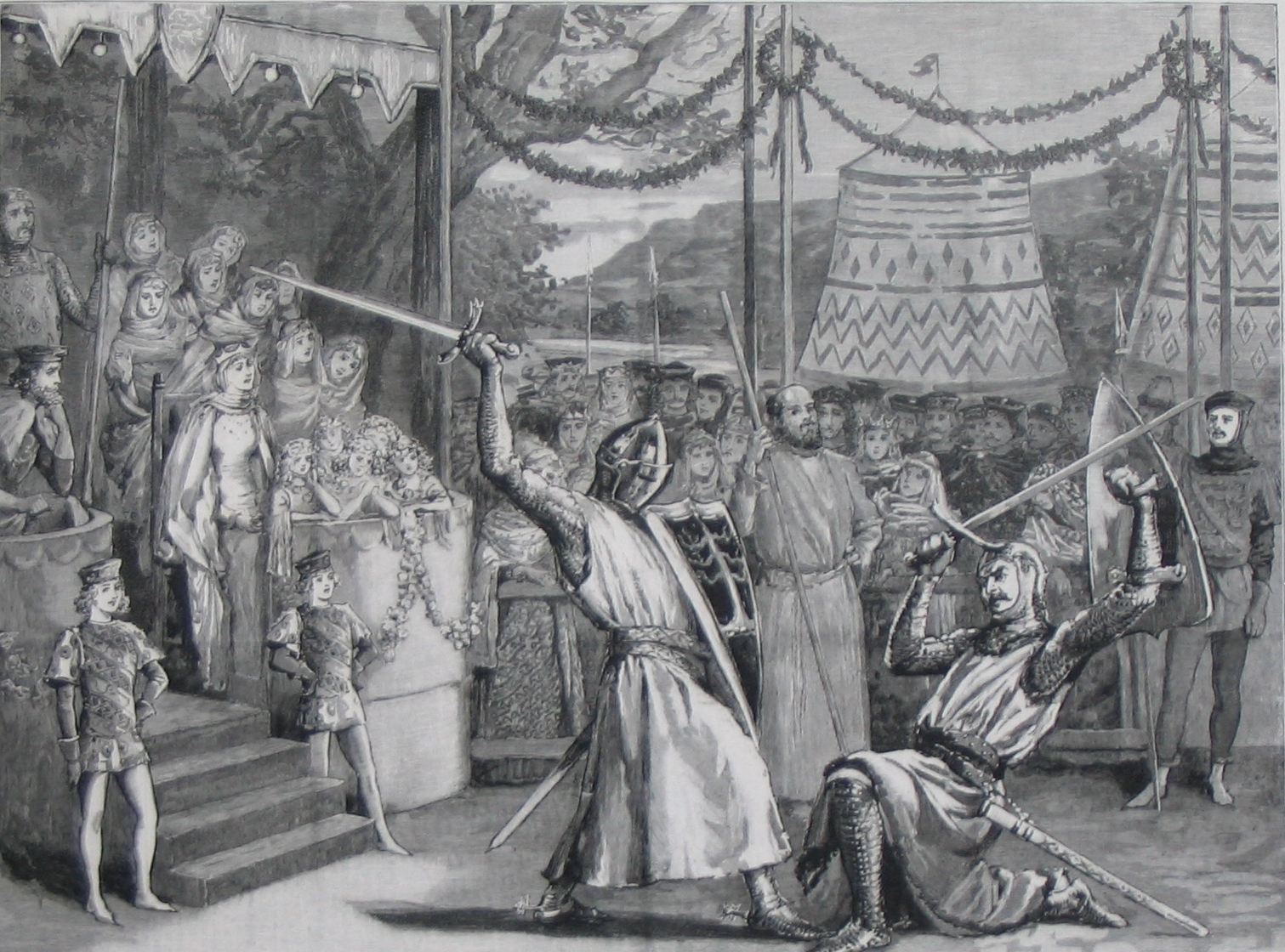
Illustration from The Graphic of Arthur Sullivan's operatic adaptation of Ivanhoe.

The Waverley novels are a long series of novels by Sir Walter Scott (1771–1832). For nearly a century, they were among the most popular and widely read novels in Europe.

Because Scott did not publicly acknowledge authorship until 1827, the series takes its name from Waverley, the first novel of the series, released in 1814. The later books bore the words "by the author of Waverley" on their title pages.

The Tales of My Landlord sub-series was not advertised as "by the author of Waverley" and thus is not always included as part of the Waverley Novels series.

== Order of publication ==
Title	Published	Main setting	Period
Waverley, or, 'Tis Sixty Years Since	1814	Perthshire (Scotland)	1745–1746
Guy Mannering, or, The Astrologer	1815	Galloway (Scotland)	1760–5, 1781–2
The Antiquary	1816	North-East Scotland	1794
Tales of My Landlord, 1st series:
The Black Dwarf	1816	Scottish Borders	1707
The Tale of Old Mortality	1816	Southern Scotland	1679–89
Rob Roy	1818	Northumberland (England), and the environs of Loch Lomond (Scotland)	1715–16
Tales of My Landlord, 2nd series:
The Heart of Midlothian	1818	Edinburgh and Richmond, London	1736
Tales of My Landlord, 3rd series:
The Bride of Lammermoor	1819	East Lothian (Scotland)	1709–11
A Legend of Montrose	1819	Scottish Highlands	1644–5
Ivanhoe	1819	Yorkshire, Nottinghamshire and Leicestershire (England)	1194
The Monastery	1820	Scottish Borders	1547–57
The Abbot	1820	Various in Scotland	1567–8
Kenilworth	1821	Berkshire and Warwickshire (England)	1575
The Pirate	1822	Shetland and Orkney (Scotland)	1689
The Fortunes of Nigel	1822	London and Greenwich (England)	1616–18
Peveril of the Peak	1822	Derbyshire, the Isle of Man, and London	1658–80
Quentin Durward	1823	Tours and Péronne (France); Liège (Wallonia/Belgium)	1468
St. Ronan's Well	1824	Southern Scotland	early 19th century
Redgauntlet	1824	Southern Scotland, and Cumberland (England)	1766
Tales of the Crusaders:
The Betrothed	1825	Wales, and Gloucester (England)	1187–92
The Talisman	1825	The Holy Land	1191
Woodstock, or, The Cavalier	1826	Woodstock and Windsor (England); Brussels, in the Spanish Netherlands	1652
Chronicles of the Canongate, 2nd series:
St Valentine's Day, or, The Fair Maid of Perth	1828	Perthshire (Scotland)	1396
Anne of Geierstein, or, The Maiden in the Mist	1829	Switzerland and Eastern France	1474–77
Tales of My Landlord, 4th series:
Count Robert of Paris	1831	Constantinople and Scutari (now in Turkey)	1097
Castle Dangerous	1831	Lanarkshire (Scotland)	1307

== Editions ==
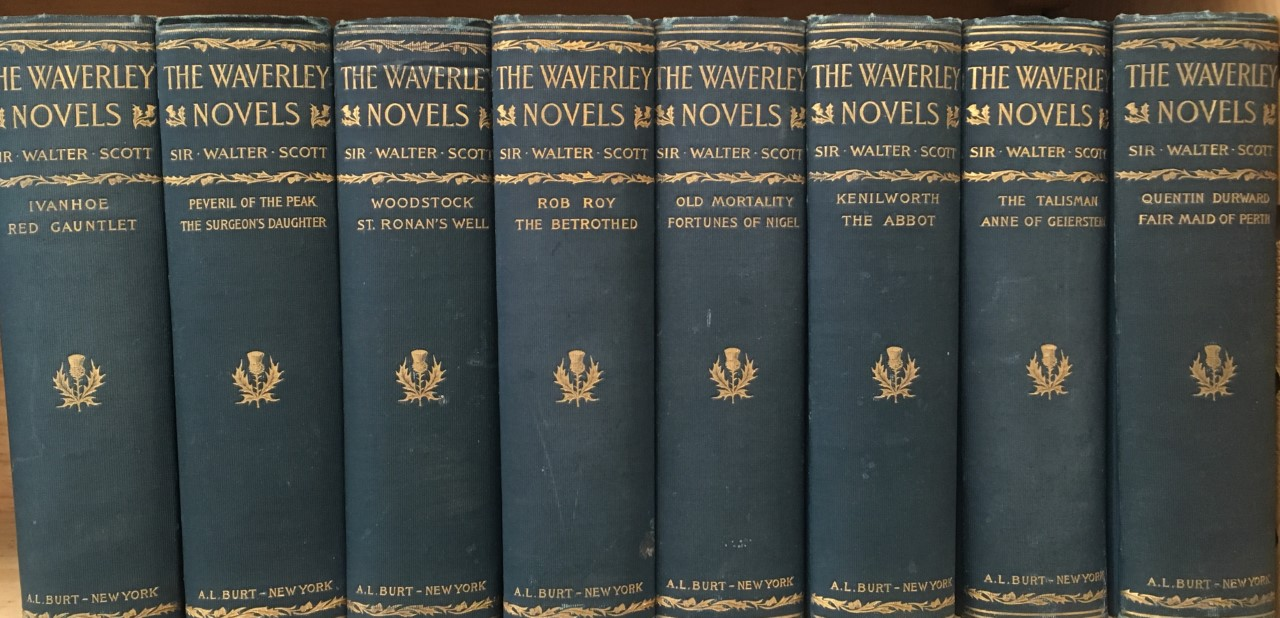
Set of Scott's Waverley Novels

The novels were all originally printed by James Ballantyne on the Canongate in Edinburgh. James Ballantyne was the brother of one of Scott's close friends, John Ballantyne ("Printed by James Ballantyne and Co. for Archibald Constable and Co., Edinburgh").

There are two definitive editions. One is the "Magnum Opus", a 48-volume set published between 1829 and 1833 by Robert Cadell, based on previous editions, with new introductions and notes by Scott. This was the basis of almost all subsequent editions until the appearance of the standard modern edition, the Edinburgh Edition of the Waverley Novels, a 30-volume set, based on early-edition texts emended mainly from the surviving manuscripts, published by Edinburgh University Press between 1993 and 2012.

== Place names ==
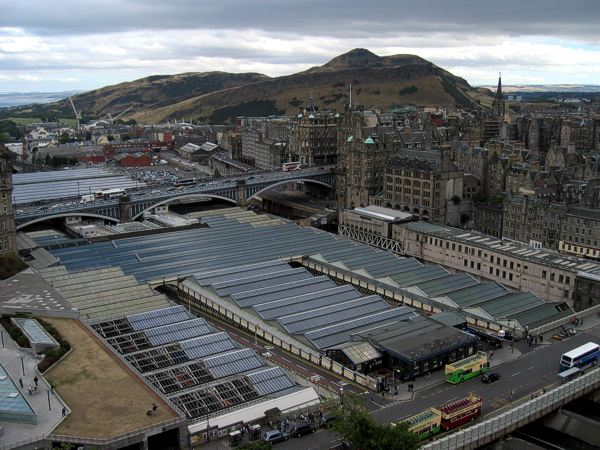
View from the Scott Monument of the Waverley Station roof, in Edinburgh, with Arthur's Seat in the background

Scott's Waverley novels provided an important cultural touchstone for British emigrants, especially those re-settling in the United States, Canada, Australia, New Zealand, and South Africa. Among other forms of influence documented in Ann Rigney's The Afterlives of Walter Scott, many places are named for Waverley, its hero Ivanhoe, and the name Scott coined for own house, Abbotsford. The historian Ewan Morris has argued that Scott is second only to William Shakespeare for his legacy of places named after entirely fictional people.

In Scotland, Waverley Station was named after the novels. Other names inspired by the novels include the paddle steamer Waverley and the Heart of Midlothian F.C.

In the United States, towns named "Waverly" were founded in Alabama, Illinois, Indiana (including a New Waverly), Iowa, Kansas, Kentucky, Minnesota, Missouri, Nebraska, Ohio, Tennessee, Texas (including a New Waverly), Virginia, West Virginia, and Wisconsin. Waverly Hall, Georgia is also named for the novel.

In Australia and New Zealand, the series' legacy includes Waverley, New South Wales; Glen Waverley and Mount Waverley in Victoria; Waverley, Dunedin; Waverley, Invercargill; Waverley, Taranaki; Ivanhoe, New South Wales; Ivanhoe, Victoria; Kenilworth, Queensland; and Mannering Park (for Guy Mannering). Additionally, Abbotsford, New South Wales and Abbotsford, Victoria are named for Scott's house. However, Abbotsford, New Zealand and the former Abbotsford in Hawke's Bay were both named for men named Abbott (though the latter does have streets named Waverley and Kenilworth for the novels of those titles). Ewan Morris has argued that Scott's novels were seen as particularly appropriate for colonial settlement names -- which typically displaced existing inhabitants and their historical place names -- because the novels "imagine the experience of settlement in romantic but ultimately reassuring terms", and evoke a historical legitimacy for the colonialism of the British empire.

== See also ==
- Tales of my Landlord
- Tales of the Crusaders
- Chronicles of the Canongate
