= William Laidlaw (poet) =

William Laidlaw (1780–1845) was a Scottish poet. The son of a border farmer, he became steward and amanuensis to Walter Scott, and was the author of a well-known ballad, Lucy's Flittin.

== Life ==
He was born 19 November 1780, at Blackhouse, Selkirkshire, where his father was a sheep-farmer. After receiving an elementary education at Peebles he assisted his father for a time. James Hogg, whose mother was his distant cousin, was employed at Blackhouse for ten years, and formed a lasting friendship with Laidlaw.

In 1801, Hogg and Laidlaw helped Scott with materials for the Border Minstrelsy. After two unsuccessful attempts at farming, in Peeblesshire and Midlothian, Laidlaw in 1817 became steward to Sir Walter Scott at Abbotsford. In 1819, when Scott was recovering from an illness, Laidlaw and Ballantyne wrote to his dictation most of The Bride of Lammermoor, and subsequently A Legend of Montrose, and nearly all Ivanhoe. St. Ronan's Well may have been due to Laidlaw's suggestion that Scott should devote a novel to "Melrose in July 1823", according to John Gibson Lockhart.

Scott suffered financial ruin; but after an interval, Laidlaw again became his amanuensis, retaining the post till Scott's death in 1832. Subsequently he was factor to Sir Charles Lockhart-Ross, 8th Baronet, at Balnagowan, Ross. Retiring in poor health, he died in the house of his brother at Contin, near Dingwall, 18 May 1845.

== Works ==
Laidlaw is remembered only for his tender song, Lucy's Flittin, published in Hogg's Forest Minstrel, 1810. After 1817 he compiled, under Scott's management and direction, part of the Edinburgh Annual Register, and contributed articles to the Edinburgh Monthly Magazine. He is also said to have written on the geology of Selkirkshire. The University of Glasgow has posted the poem in its entirety.
