= Tales of My Landlord =

Series of novels by Sir Walter Scott

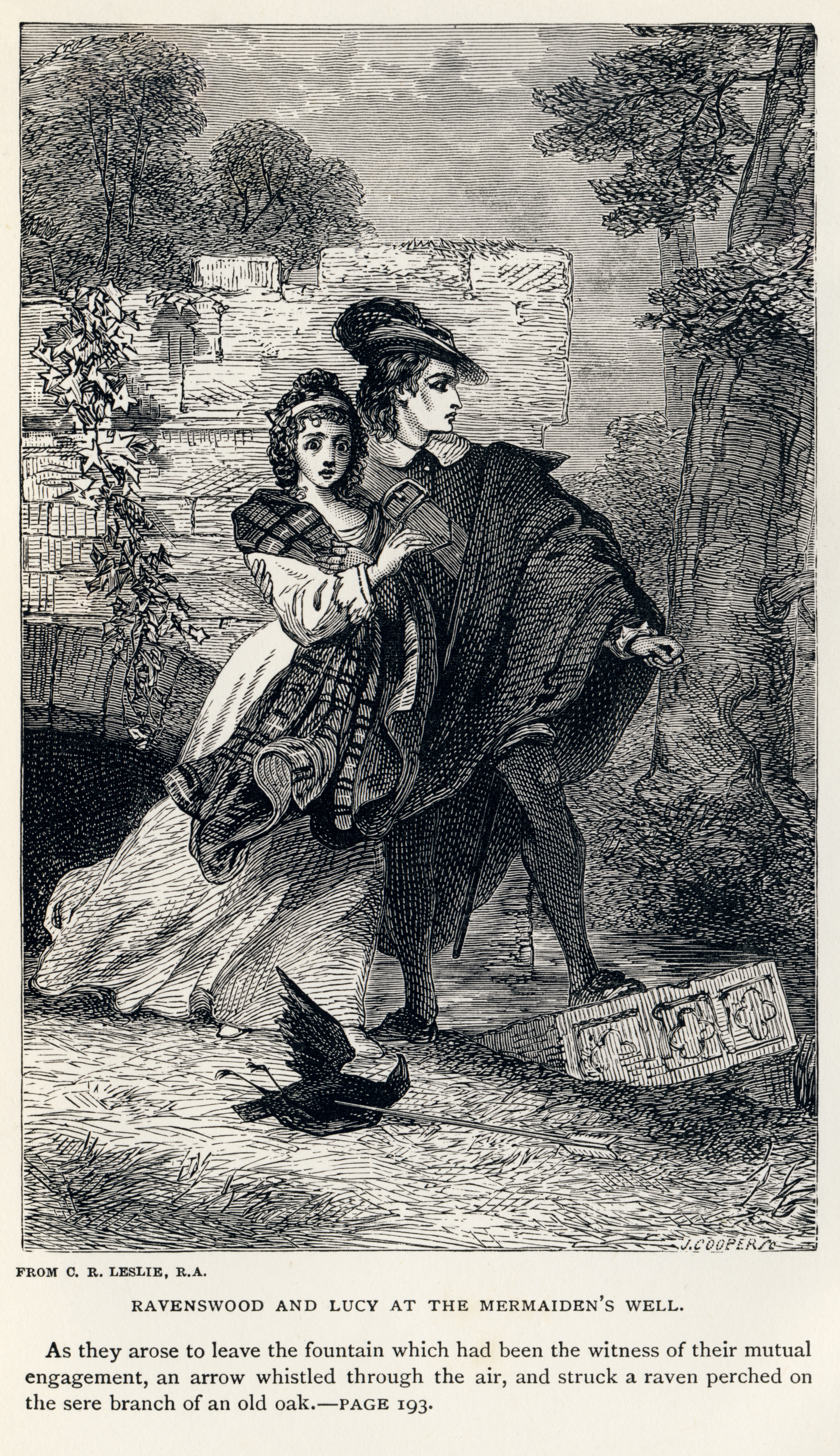
A scene from The Bride of Lammermoor

Tales of My Landlord is a series of novels by Sir Walter Scott (1771–1832) that form a subset of the Waverley Novels. They were so called because they were supposed to be tales collected from the (fictional) landlord of the Wallace Inn at Gandercleugh, compiled by a "Peter Pattieson", and edited and sent to the publisher by Jedediah Cleishbotham. This is gone into in great depth in the introduction to The Black Dwarf.

There are four series:

Title	Published	Main setting	Period
Tales of My Landlord, 1st series:
The Black Dwarf	1816	Scottish Borders	1707
The Tale of Old Mortality	1816	Southern Scotland	1679–1689
Tales of my Landlord, 2nd series:
The Heart of Midlothian	1818	Edinburgh, Richmond, London,	1736
Tales of my Landlord, 3rd series:
The Bride of Lammermoor	1819	East Lothian	1709–1711
A Legend of Montrose	1819	Scottish Highlands	1644–1645
Tales of my Landlord, 4th series:
Count Robert of Paris	1832	Constantinople, Scutari	1097
Castle Dangerous	1832	Lanarkshire	1307

Of these, The Heart of Midlothian and The Bride of Lammermoor have been the most successful, and Old Mortality is considered by modern critics to be among Scott's best work. The fourth series was the least successful.

The first series was planned to comprise four volumes, each containing a separate novel, but Scott – by his own admission – botched The Black Dwarf, and Old Mortality came to be three volumes in its own right. The other three series thus consisted of two volumes each, or just one, in the case of the second.

They were supposed to reflect aspects of Scottish regional life.

== See also ==
- Waverley Novels
