= Robert Cadell =

Scottish bookseller and publisher (1788-1849)

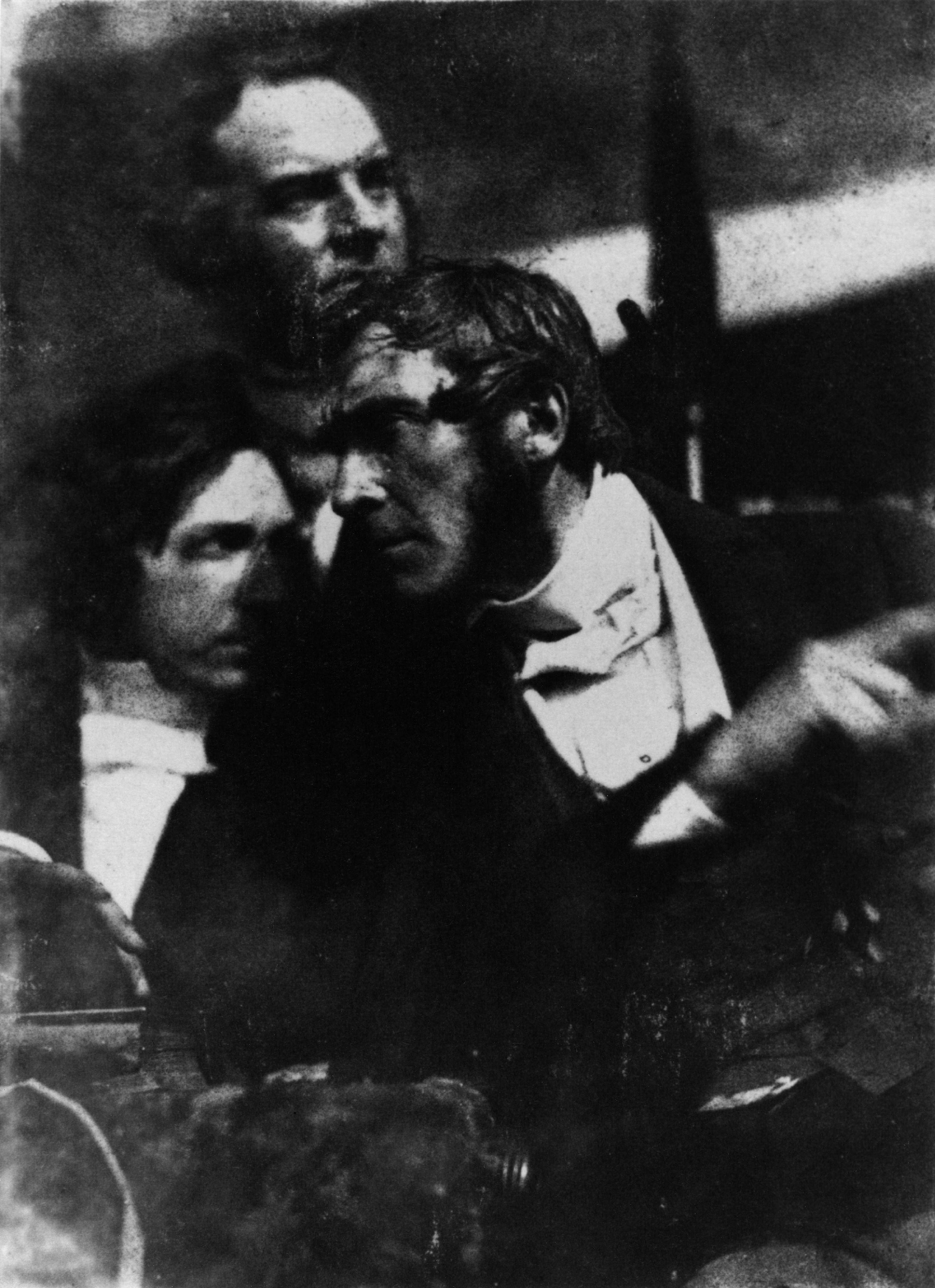
Graham Fyvie, Robert Cadell and Robert Cunningham Graham Spiers, by Hill & Adamson.

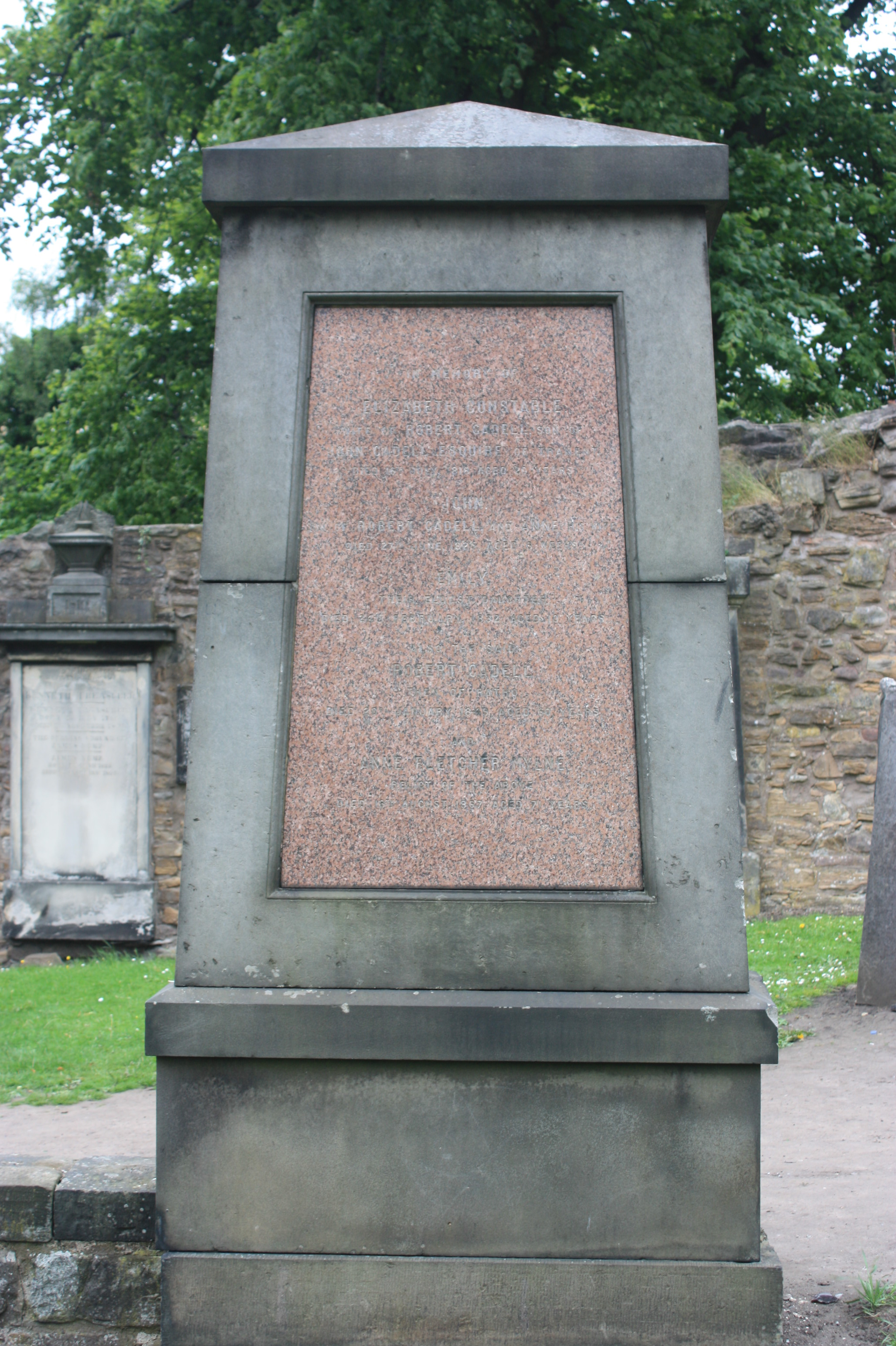
The grave of Robert Cadell, Greyfriars Kirkyard

Robert Cadell (16 December 1788 – 20 January 1849) was a Scottish bookseller and publisher closely associated with Sir Walter Scott.

== Life ==
He was born at Cockenzie, East Lothian, Scotland, the fifth son of John Cadell, a Laird of Cockenzie, and Marie Buchan, his wife.

Cadell's career began as a clerk at Archibald Constable & Co., Sir Walter Scott's publisher, where he acquired an interest in the firm from 1809, became a joint partner in 1811 after Mr Hunter of Blackness dropped out, and from 1812 was sole partner with Constable. The connection to Constable was also personal: Cadell married his daughter Elizabeth in October 1817. She died less than nine months later. Cadell married again (to Anne Fletcher Mylne) in 1821, adding to the friction which had developed between Constable and Cadell since the death of Elizabeth. The two men were very different characters: Cadell was cautious and lived plainly, while Constable's lifestyle was lavish and he took risks in business.

When Constable's London agents Hurst Robinson went bankrupt and Archibald Constable & Co. itself fell into receivership in January 1826 through the effects of Scott's own bankruptcy, the partnership between Cadell and Constable dissolved. Scott chose to remain with Cadell, respecting Cadell's prudence in business affairs.

Scott and Cadell purchased the copyright to Scott's novels and produced a new edition of the Waverley novels including new material penned by Scott. The work to create this ‘author's edition’ commenced in 1827 and was highly successful, in part perhaps because of the illustrations executed for it by J. M. W. Turner.

Cadell took care of Scott in the writer's last years, profiting handsomely from arrangements made with Scott's family after his death such that they were absolved from debt in return for Cadell's exclusive right to republish Scott's novels and biographical material. On Scott's death, Cadell paid £30,000 for Scott's share of the copyright on Scott's work, thereafter owning it outright. Cadell's wealth enabled him to acquire considerable land and personal property, including Ratho House, in Midlothian.

Cadell died at Ratho on 20 January 1849 and is buried in Greyfriars Kirkyard in central Edinburgh. The grave stands at the head of one of the western lines in the western extension.

== Family ==
He first married Elizabeth Constable, daughter of his employer Archibald Constable. She died in 1818.

He was then married to Anne Fletcher Mylne (1796–1867).

They had a son John in 1826 who only lived for 6 weeks. Their daughter Emily (1821–1832) also died young.

His daughter Frances married Rev Robert Horne Stevenson.
