= Walter Scott =

Scottish novelist (1771–1832)

Sir Walter Scott Bt FRSE FSA Scot
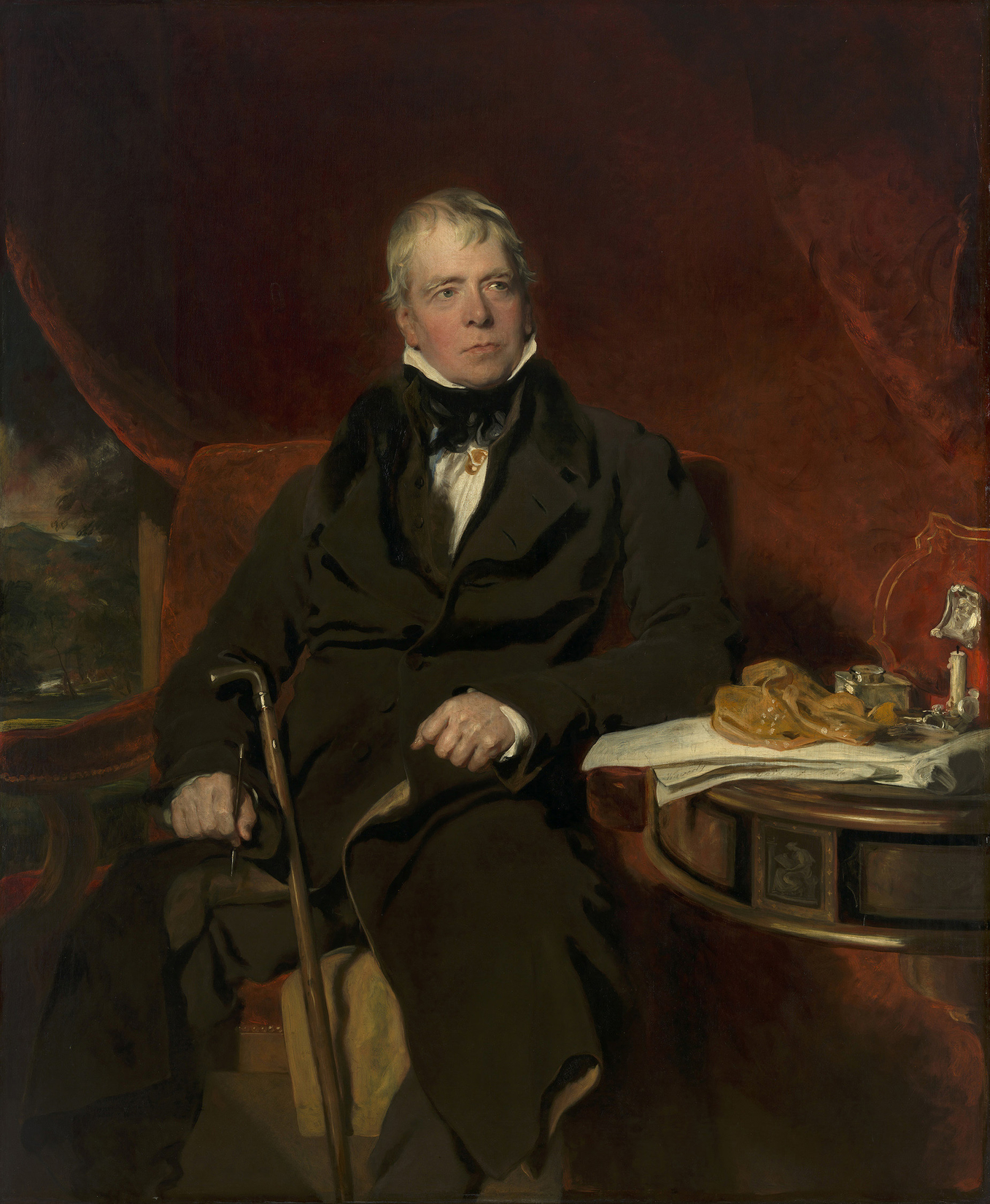
- Sir Walter Scott by Sir Thomas Lawrence, 1826
- Born: 15 August 1771; Edinburgh, Scotland
- Died: 21 September 1832 (aged 61); Abbotsford, Selkirkshire, Scotland
- Education: University of Edinburgh
- Military Service
- Allegiance: Great Britain
- Branch: British Militia
- Service years: 1797–1802
- Rank: Quartermaster
- Unit: Royal Edinburgh Volunteer Light Dragoons
- Conflicts: French Revolutionary Wars
- Occupations: Historical novelist; Poet; Advocate; Sheriff-Depute; Clerk of Session
- Spouse: Charlotte Carpenter (Charpentier) (m. 1797; died 1826)
- Children: 5: unnamed son (died shortly after birth), Sophia, Walter, Anna, Charles
- Writing career
- Genres: Novel, poetry
- Subject: History
- Movement: Romanticism

Sir Walter Scott, 1st Baronet (15 August 1771 – 21 September 1832), was a Scottish novelist, poet and historian. Many of his works remain classics of European and Scottish literature. He is known for his Waverley novels (1814–1831), which were, for nearly a century, among the most popular and widely read novels in Europe. He is also known for his narrative poems Marmion (1808) and The Lady of the Lake (1810). He greatly influenced European and American literature.

As an advocate and legal administrator by profession, he combined writing and editing with his daily work as Clerk of Session and Sheriff-Depute of Selkirkshire. He was prominent in Edinburgh's Tory establishment, active in the Highland Society, a long time president of the Royal Society of Edinburgh (1820–1832), and a vice president of the Society of Antiquaries of Scotland (1827–1829). His knowledge of history and literary facility equipped him to establish the historical novel genre as an exemplar of European Romanticism. He became a baronet of Abbotsford in the County of Roxburgh on 22 April 1820; the title became extinct upon his son's death in 1847.

== Early life ==
Walter Scott was born on 15 August 1771 in a third-floor apartment on College Wynd in the Old Town, Edinburgh, a narrow alleyway leading from the Cowgate to the gates of the old University of Edinburgh. He was the ninth child (of which six died in infancy) of Walter Scott Senior (1729 – 1799), who was a member of a cadet branch of the Clan Scott and a Writer to the Signet. His mother was Anne Rutherford, who was a sister of Daniel Rutherford, who was a descendant both of the Clan Swinton and of the Scottish Haliburton family (whose prominent English members were to shorten their surname to 'Burton'). His maternal ancestry granted Scott the hereditary right of burial in Dryburgh Abbey.

Scott was, through his mother's Haliburton ancestry, a cousin of the eminent London property-developer James Burton, who had shortened his surname to 'Burton', and of his son, the architect Decimus Burton. Scott became a member of the London Clarence Club, of which the Burtons were members.

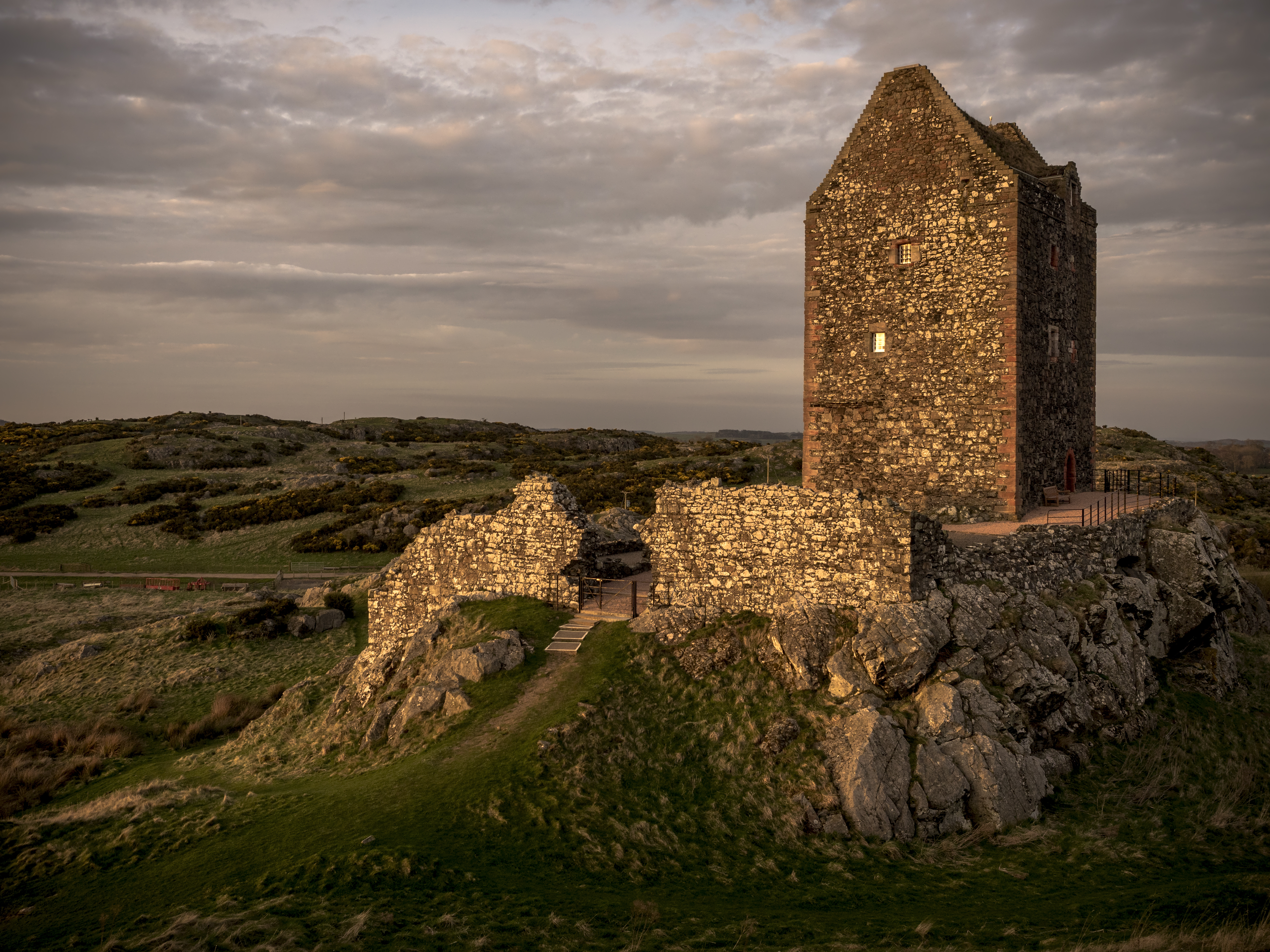
Scott's childhood at Sandyknowes, in the shadow of Smailholm Tower, introduced him to the tales and folklore of the Scottish Borders

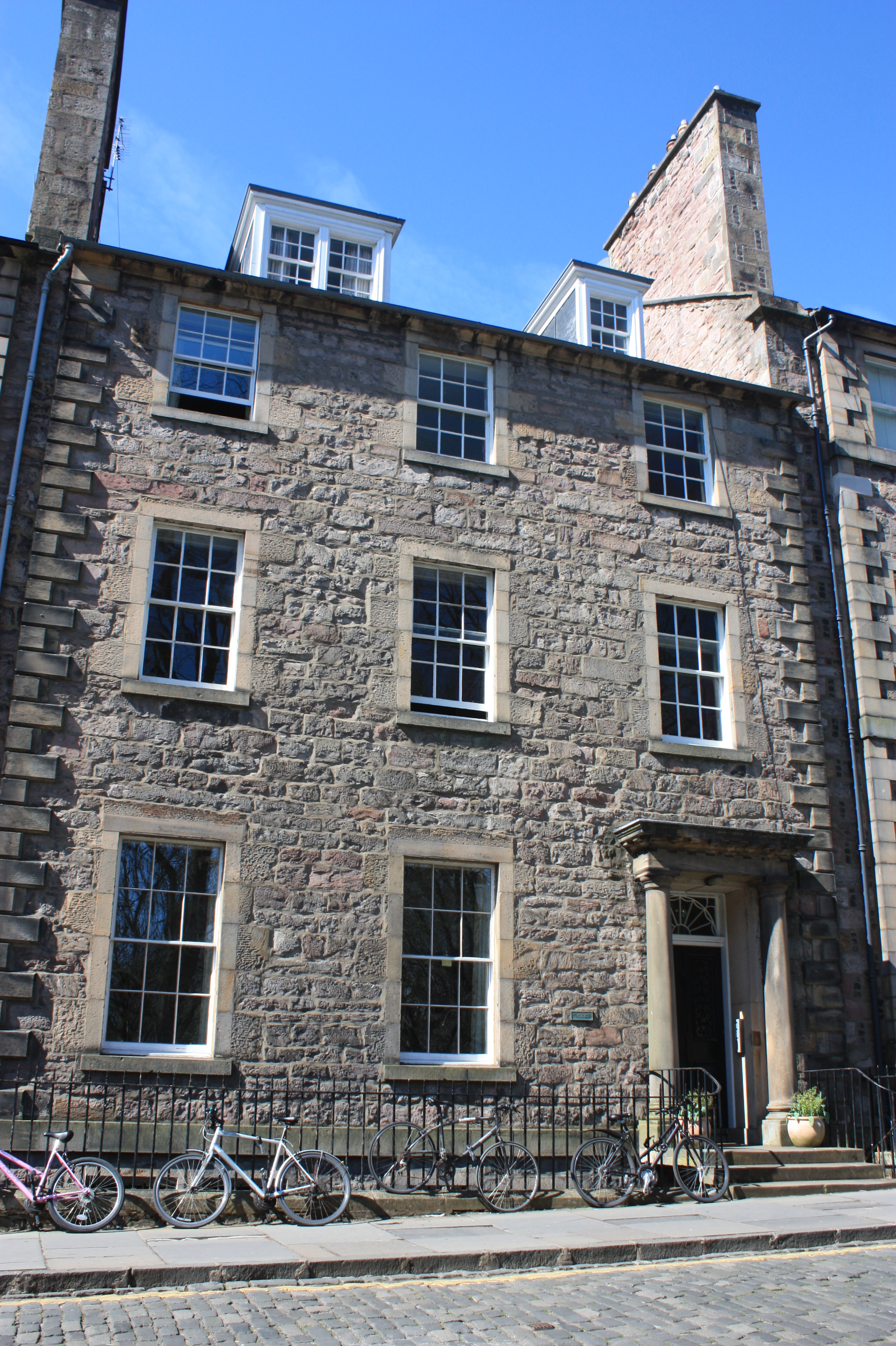
The Scott family's home in George Square, Edinburgh, from about 1778

A childhood bout of polio in 1773 left Scott lame, a condition that would greatly affect his life and writing.

To improve his lameness, he was sent in 1773 to live in the rural Scottish Borders, at his paternal grandparents' farm at Sandyknowe, by the ruin of Smailholm Tower, the earlier family home. There, he was taught to read by his aunt Jenny Scott, and learned from her the speech patterns and many of the tales and legends that later marked much of his work. In January 1775, he returned to Edinburgh, and that summer with his aunt Jenny took spa treatment at Bath in Somerset, southern England, where they lived at 6 South Parade. In the winter of 1776, he went back to Sandyknowe, with another attempt at a water cure at Prestonpans the following summer.

In 1778, Scott returned to Edinburgh for private education to prepare him for school. He joined his family in their new house, one of the first to be built in George Square. In October 1779, he began at the Royal High School in Edinburgh (in High School Yards). He was by then able to walk and explore the city and the surrounding countryside. His reading included chivalric romances, poems, history, and travel books. He was given private tuition by James Mitchell in arithmetic and writing, and learned from him the history of the Church of Scotland with emphasis on the Covenanters.

In 1783, his parents, believing he had outgrown his strength, sent him to stay for six months with his aunt Jenny at Kelso in the Scottish Borders. There, he attended Kelso Grammar School, where he met James Ballantyne and his brother John, who later became his business partners and printers.

=== Appearance ===
As a result of his early polio infection, Scott had a pronounced limp. He was described in 1820 as "tall, well formed (except for one ankle and foot which made him walk lamely), neither fat nor thin, with forehead very high, nose short, upper lip long and face rather fleshy, complexion fresh and clear, eyes very blue, shrewd and penetrating, with hair now silvery white". Although a determined walker, he experienced greater freedom of movement on horseback.

== Student ==
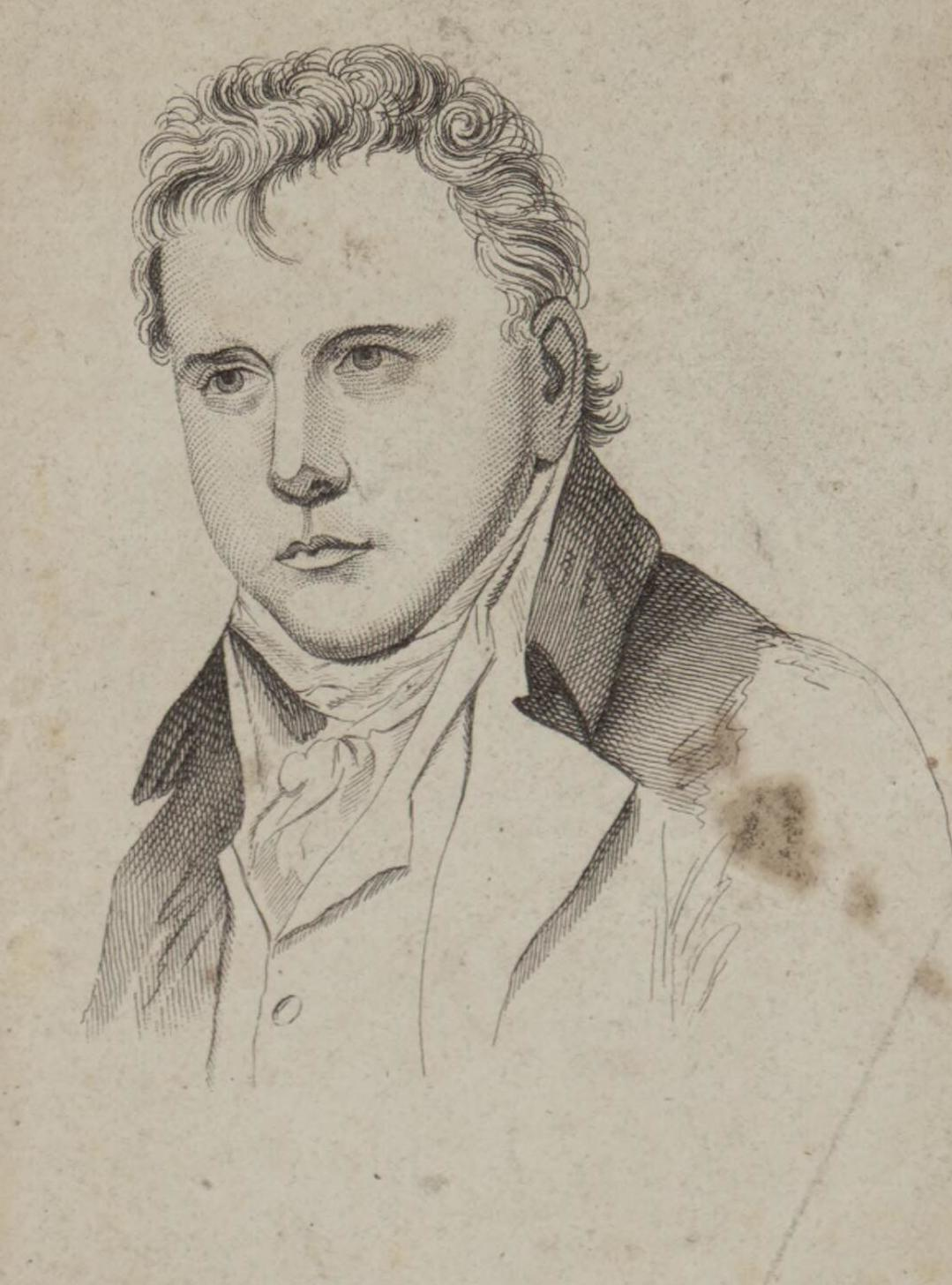
Sketch of Scott c.1800 by an unknown artist

Scott began studying classics at the University of Edinburgh in November 1783, at the age of 12, a year or so younger than most fellow students. In March 1786, aged 14, he began an apprenticeship in his father's office to become a Writer to the Signet. At school and university, Scott befriended Adam Ferguson, whose father, Professor Adam Ferguson, hosted literary salons. Scott met the blind poet Thomas Blacklock, who lent him books and introduced him to the Ossian cycle of poems by James Macpherson. During the winter of 1786–1787, the 15-year-old Scott met the Scots poet Robert Burns at one of these salons, their only meeting. When Burns noticed a print illustrating the poem "The Justice of the Peace" and asked who had written it, Scott alone named the author as John Langhorne and was thanked by Burns. Scott describes the event in his memoirs, where he whispers the answer to his friend Adam, who tells Burns. Another version of the event appears in Literary Beginnings.

When it was decided he would become a lawyer, he returned to the university to study law, first taking classes in moral philosophy under Dugald Stewart and universal history under Alexander Fraser Tytler in 1789–1790. During this second university spell, Scott became prominent in student intellectual activities: he co-founded the Literary Society in 1789 and was elected to the Speculative Society the following year, becoming librarian and secretary-treasurer a year after.

After completing his law studies, Scott took up law in Edinburgh. He made his first visit as a lawyer's clerk to the Scottish Highlands, directing an eviction. He was admitted to the Faculty of Advocates in 1792. He had an unsuccessful love suit with Williamina Belsches of Fettercairn, who married Scott's friend, Sir William Forbes, 7th Baronet. In February 1797, the threat of a French invasion persuaded Scott and many of his friends to join the Royal Edinburgh Volunteer Light Dragoons, where he served into the early 1800s, and was appointed quartermaster and secretary. The daily drill practices that year, starting at 5 am, indicate the determination with which the role was undertaken.

== Literary career, marriage and family ==
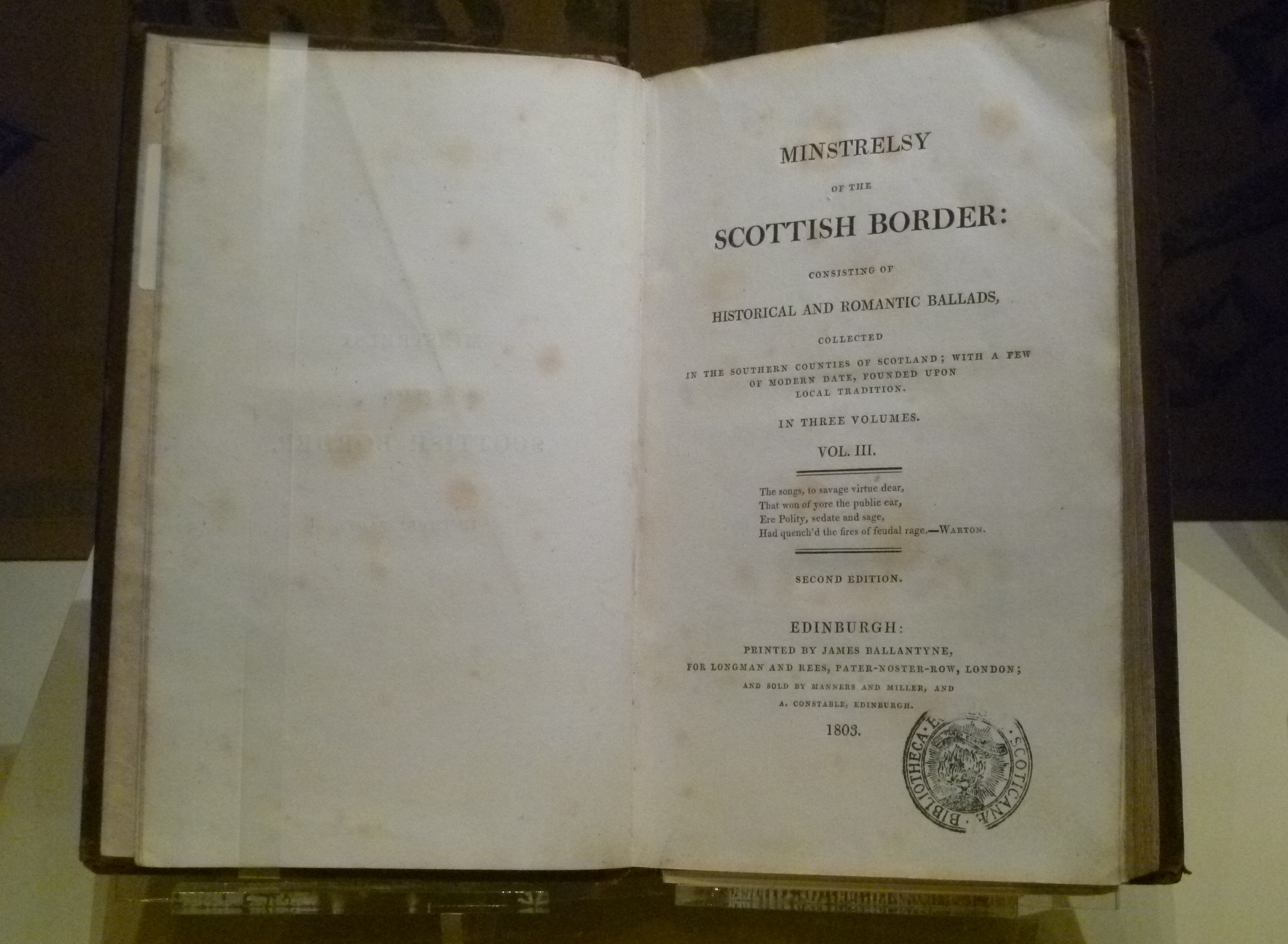
A copy of Scott's Minstrelsy, in the National Museum of Scotland

Scott was prompted to take up a literary career by enthusiasm in Edinburgh in the 1790s for modern German literature. Recalling the period in 1827, Scott said he "was German-mad." In 1796, he produced English versions of two poems by Gottfried August Bürger, Der wilde Jäger and Lenore, published as The Chase, and William and Helen. Scott responded to the German interest at the time in national identity, folk culture, and medieval literature, which linked with his own developing passion for traditional balladry. A favourite book since childhood was Thomas Percy's Reliques of Ancient English Poetry. During the 1790s, he would search in manuscript collections and on Border "raids" for ballads from oral performance. With help from John Leyden, he produced a two-volume Minstrelsy of the Scottish Border in 1802, containing 48 traditional ballads and two imitations apiece by Leyden and himself. Of the 48 traditionals, 26 were published for the first time. An enlarged edition appeared in three volumes the following year. With many of the ballads, Scott fused different versions into more coherent texts, a practice he later repudiated. The Minstrelsy was the first and most important of a series of editorial projects over the next two decades, including the medieval romance Sir Tristrem (which Scott attributed to Thomas the Rhymer) in 1804, the works of John Dryden (18 vols, 1808), and the works of Jonathan Swift (19 vols, 1814).

On a trip to the English Lake District with old college friends, he met Charlotte Charpentier (Anglicised to "Carpenter"), a daughter of Jean Charpentier of Lyon in France and a ward of Lord Downshire in Cumberland, an Anglican. After three weeks' courtship, Scott proposed and they were married on Christmas Eve 1797 in St Mary's Church, Carlisle (now the nave of Carlisle Cathedral). After renting a house in Edinburgh's George Street, they moved to nearby South Castle Street. Their eldest child, Sophia, was born in 1799, and later married John Gibson Lockhart. Four of their five children survived Scott himself. His eldest son, Sir Walter Scott, 2nd Baronet (1801–1847), inherited his father's estates and possessions: on 3 February 1825 he married Jane Jobson, only daughter of William Jobson of Lochore (died 1822) by his wife Rachel Stuart (died 1863), heiress of Lochore and a niece of Lady Margaret Ferguson. In 1799, Scott was appointed Sheriff of Selkirk, based at the courthouse in the Royal Burgh of Selkirk. In his early married days, Scott earned a decent living from his work as a lawyer, his salary as Sheriff-Depute, his wife's income, some revenue from his writing, and his share of his father's modest estate.

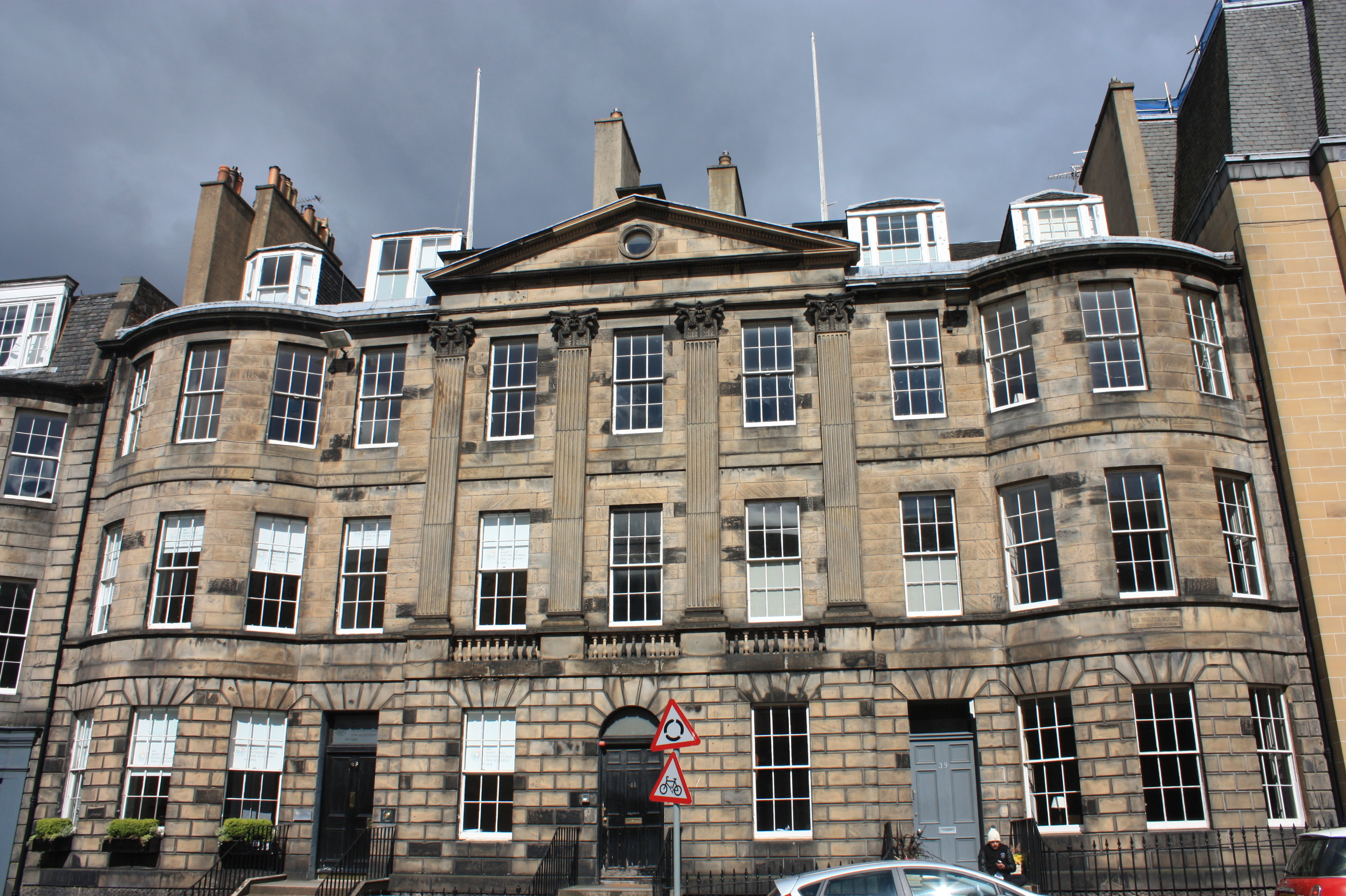
Right to left: numbers 39, 41 and 43 North Castle Street, Edinburgh. No 39 was the home of Sir Walter Scott from 1801

After the younger Walter was born in 1801, the Scotts moved to a spacious three-storey house at 39 North Castle Street, which remained his Edinburgh base until 1826, when it was sold by the trustees appointed after his financial ruin. From 1798, Scott had spent summers in a cottage at Lasswade, where he entertained guests, including literary figures. His career as an author began there. There were nominal residency requirements for his position of Sheriff-Depute, and at first he stayed at a local inn during the circuit. In 1804, he ended his use of the Lasswade cottage and leased the substantial house of Ashestiel, 6 miles (9.7 km) from Selkirk, on the south bank of the River Tweed and incorporating an ancient tower house.

At Scott's insistence, the first edition of Minstrelsy was printed by his friend James Ballantyne at Kelso. In 1798, Ballantyne had published Scott's version of Johann Wolfgang von Goethe's Erlkönig in his newspaper, The Kelso Mail, and in 1799 included it and the two Bürger translations in a privately printed anthology, Apology for Tales of Terror. In 1800, Scott suggested that Ballantyne set up business in Edinburgh and provided a loan for him to make the transition in 1802. In 1805, they became partners in the printing business, and from then until the financial crash of 1826, Scott's works were routinely printed by the firm.

Scott was known for his fondness of dogs, and owned several throughout his life. Upon his death, one newspaper noted "of all the great men who have loved dogs no one ever loved them better or understood them more thoroughly". The best known of Scott's dogs were Maida, a large stag hound reported to be his favourite dog, and Spice, a Dandie Dinmont terrier described as having asthma, to which Scott gave particular care. In a diary entry written at the height of his financial woes, Scott described dismay at the prospect of having to sell them: "The thoughts of parting from these dumb creatures have moved me more than any of the reflections I have put down".

== The poet ==
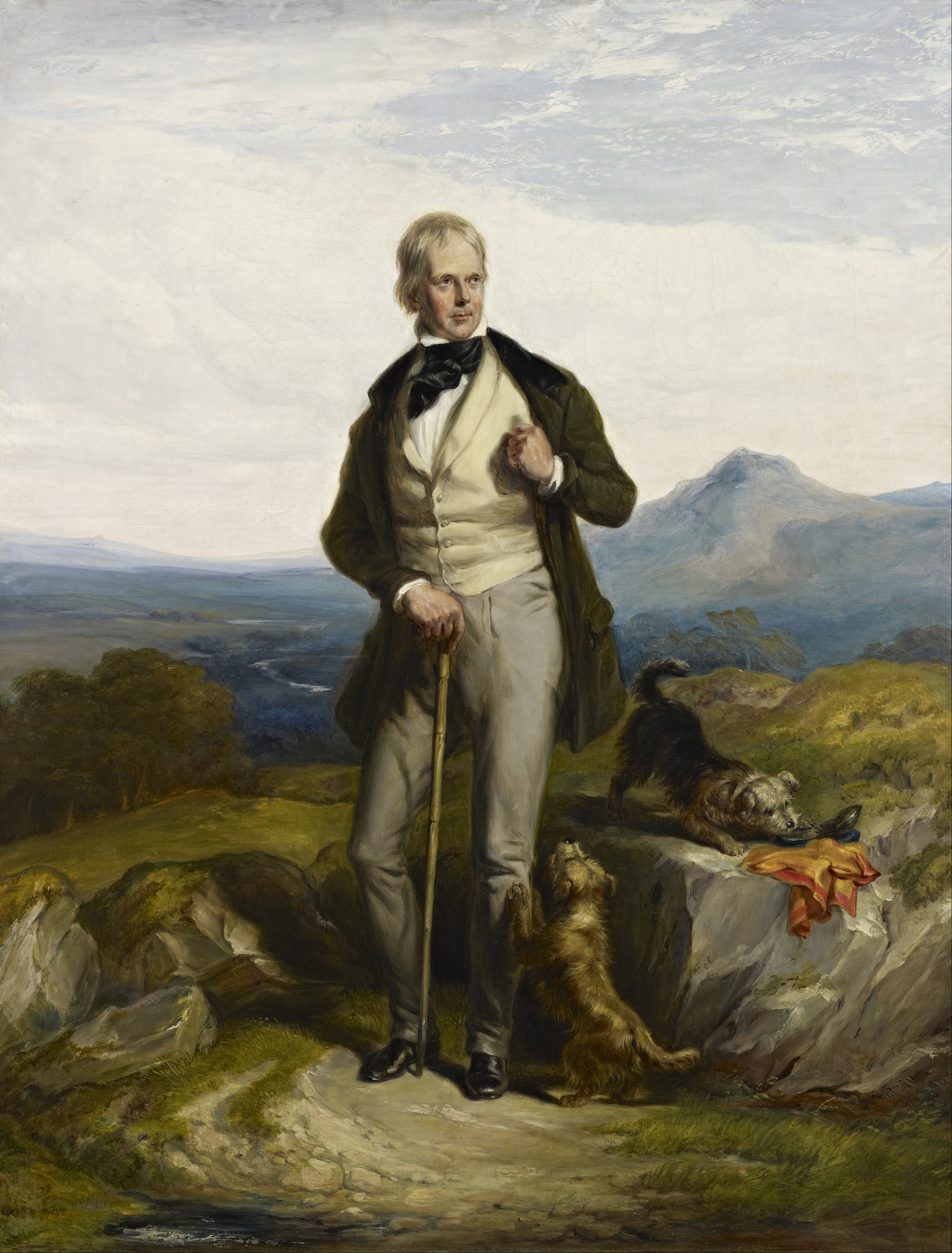
Sir Walter Scott, novelist and poet – painted by Sir William Allan

Between 1805 and 1817 Scott produced five long, six-canto narrative poems, four shorter independently published poems, and many small metrical pieces. Scott was by far the most popular poet of the time until Lord Byron published the first two cantos of Childe Harold's Pilgrimage in 1812 and followed them up with his exotic oriental verse narratives.

The Lay of the Last Minstrel (1805), in medieval romance form, grew out of Scott's plan to include a long original poem of his own in the second edition of the Minstrelsy: it was to be "a sort of Romance of Border Chivalry & inchantment". He owed the distinctive irregular accent in four-beat metre to Samuel Taylor Coleridge's Christabel, which he had heard recited by John Stoddart. (It was not to be published until 1816.) Scott was able to draw on his unrivalled familiarity with Border history and legend acquired from oral and written sources beginning in his childhood to present an energetic and highly coloured picture of 16th-century Scotland, which both captivated the general public and with its voluminous notes also addressed itself to the antiquarian student. The poem has a strong moral theme, as human pride is placed in the context of the last judgment with the introduction of a version of the "Dies irae" at the end. The work was an immediate success with almost all the reviewers and with readers in general, going through five editions in one year. The most celebrated lines are the ones that open the final stanza:

Breathes there the man, with soul so dead,
Who never to himself hath said,
This is my own, my native land!
Whose heart hath ne'er within him burned,
As home his footsteps he hath turned,
From wandering on a foreign strand!—
If such there breathe, go, mark him well;
For him no minstrel raptures swell.

Three years after The Lay Scott published Marmion (1808) telling a story of corrupt passions leading up as a disastrous climax to the Battle of Flodden in 1513. The main innovation involves prefacing each of the six cantos with an epistle from the author to a friend: William Stewart Rose, The Rev. John Marriot, William Erskine, James Skene, George Ellis, and Richard Heber: the epistles develop themes of moral positives and special delights imparted by art. In an unprecedented move, the publisher Archibald Constable purchased the copyright of the poem for a thousand guineas at the beginning of 1807, when only the first had been completed. Constable's faith was justified by the sales: the three editions published in 1808 sold 8,000 copies. The verse of Marmion is less striking than that of The Lay, with the epistles in iambic tetrameters and the narrative in tetrameters with frequent trimeters. The reception by the reviewers was less favourable than that accorded The Lay: style and plot were both found faulty, the epistles did not link up with the narrative, there was too much antiquarian pedantry, and Marmion's character was immoral. The most familiar lines in the poem sum up one of its main themes: "O what a tangled web we weave,/ When first we practice to deceive"

Scott's meteoric poetic career peaked with his third long narrative, The Lady of the Lake (1810), which sold 20,000 copies in the first year. The reviewers were fairly favourable, finding the defects noted in Marmion largely absent. In some ways it is more conventional than its predecessors: the narrative is entirely in iambic tetrameters and the story of the transparently disguised James V (King of Scots 1513‒42) predictable: Coleridge wrote to William Wordsworth: 'The movement of the Poem... is between a sleeping Canter and a Marketwoman's trot – but it is endless – I seem never to have made any way – I never remember a narrative poem in which I felt the sense of Progress so languid." But the metrical uniformity is relieved by frequent songs and the Perthshire Highland setting is presented as an enchanted landscape, which caused a phenomenal increase in the local tourist trade. Moreover, the poem touches on a theme that was to be central to the Waverley Novels: the clash between neighbouring societies in different stages of development.

The remaining two long narrative poems, Rokeby (1813), set in the Yorkshire estate of that name belonging to Scott's friend John Bacon Sawrey Morritt during the Civil War period, and The Lord of the Isles (1815), set in early 14th-century Scotland and culminating in the Battle of Bannockburn in 1314. Both works had generally favourable receptions and sold well, but without rivalling the huge success of The Lady of the Lake. Scott also produced four minor narrative or semi-narrative poems between 1811 and 1817: The Vision of Don Roderick (1811, celebrating Wellington's successes in the Peninsular Campaign, with profits donated to Portuguese war sufferers); The Bridal of Triermain (published anonymously in 1813); The Field of Waterloo (1815); and Harold the Dauntless (published anonymously in 1817).

Throughout his creative life Scott was an active reviewer. Although himself a Tory he reviewed for The Edinburgh Review between 1803 and 1806, but that journal's advocacy of peace with Napoleon led him to cancel his subscription in 1808. The following year, at the height of his poetic career, he was instrumental in establishing a Tory rival, The Quarterly Review to which he contributed reviews for the rest of his life.

In 1813 Scott was offered the position of Poet Laureate. He declined, feeling that "such an appointment would be a poisoned chalice," as the Laureateship had fallen into disrepute due to the decline in quality of work suffered by previous title holders, "as a succession of poetasters had churned out conventional and obsequious odes on royal occasions." He sought advice from the 4th Duke of Buccleuch, who counselled him to retain his literary independence. The position went to Scott's friend Robert Southey.

== The novelist ==
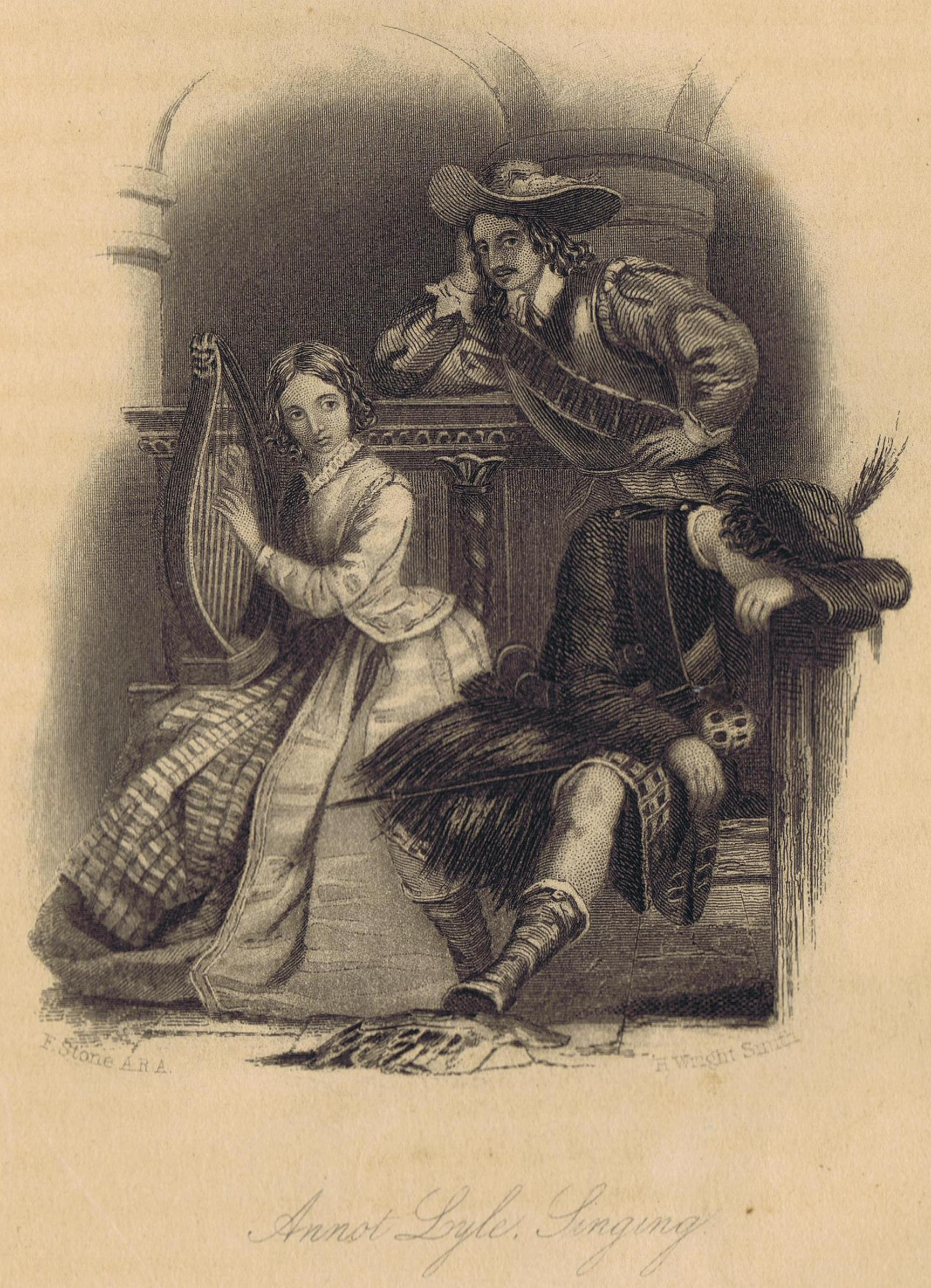
A Legend of Montrose, illustration from the 1872 edition

=== Gothic novel ===
Scott was influenced by Gothic romance, and had collaborated in 1801 with 'Monk' Lewis on Tales of Wonder.

=== Historic romances ===
Scott's career as a novelist was attended with uncertainty. The first few chapters of Waverley were complete by roughly 1805, but the project was abandoned as a result of unfavourable criticism from a friend. Soon after, Scott was asked by the publisher John Murray to posthumously edit and complete the last chapter of an unfinished romance by Joseph Strutt. Published in 1808 and set in 15th-century England, Queenhoo Hall was not a success due to its archaic language and excessive display of antiquarian information. The success of Scott's Highland narrative poem The Lady of the Lake in 1810 seems to have put it into his head to resume the narrative and have his hero Edward Waverley journey to Scotland. Although Waverley was announced for publication at that stage, it was again laid by and not resumed until late 1813, then published in 1814. Only a thousand copies were printed, but the work was an immediate success and 3,000 more were added in two further editions the same year. Waverley turned out to be the first of 27 novels (eight published in pairs), and by the time the sixth of them, Rob Roy, was published, the print run for the first edition had been increased to 10,000 copies, which became the norm.

Given Scott's established status as a poet and the tentative nature of Waverley's emergence, it is not surprising that he followed a common practice in the period and published it anonymously. He continued this until his financial ruin in 1826, the novels mostly appearing as "By the Author of Waverley" (or variants thereof) or as Tales of My Landlord. It is not clear why he chose to do this (no fewer than eleven reasons have been suggested), especially as it was a fairly open secret, but as he himself said, with Shylock, "such was my humour."

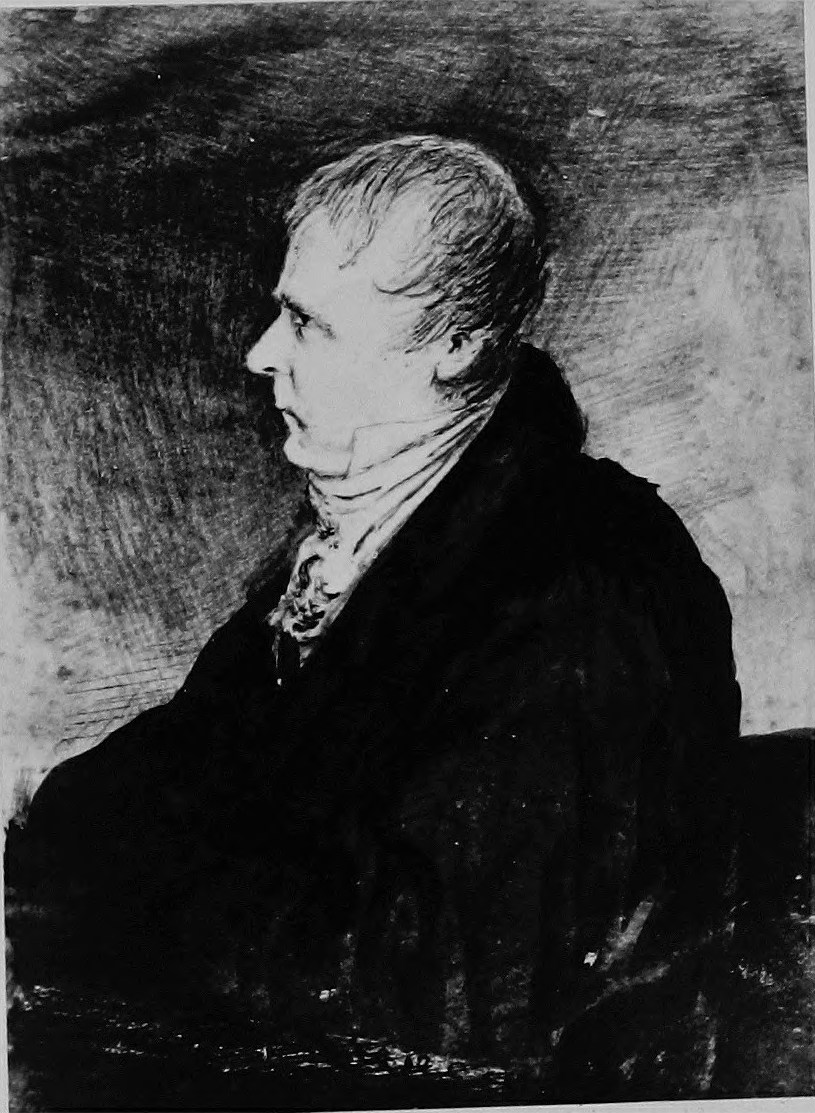
Sir Walter Scott by Robert Scott Moncrieff

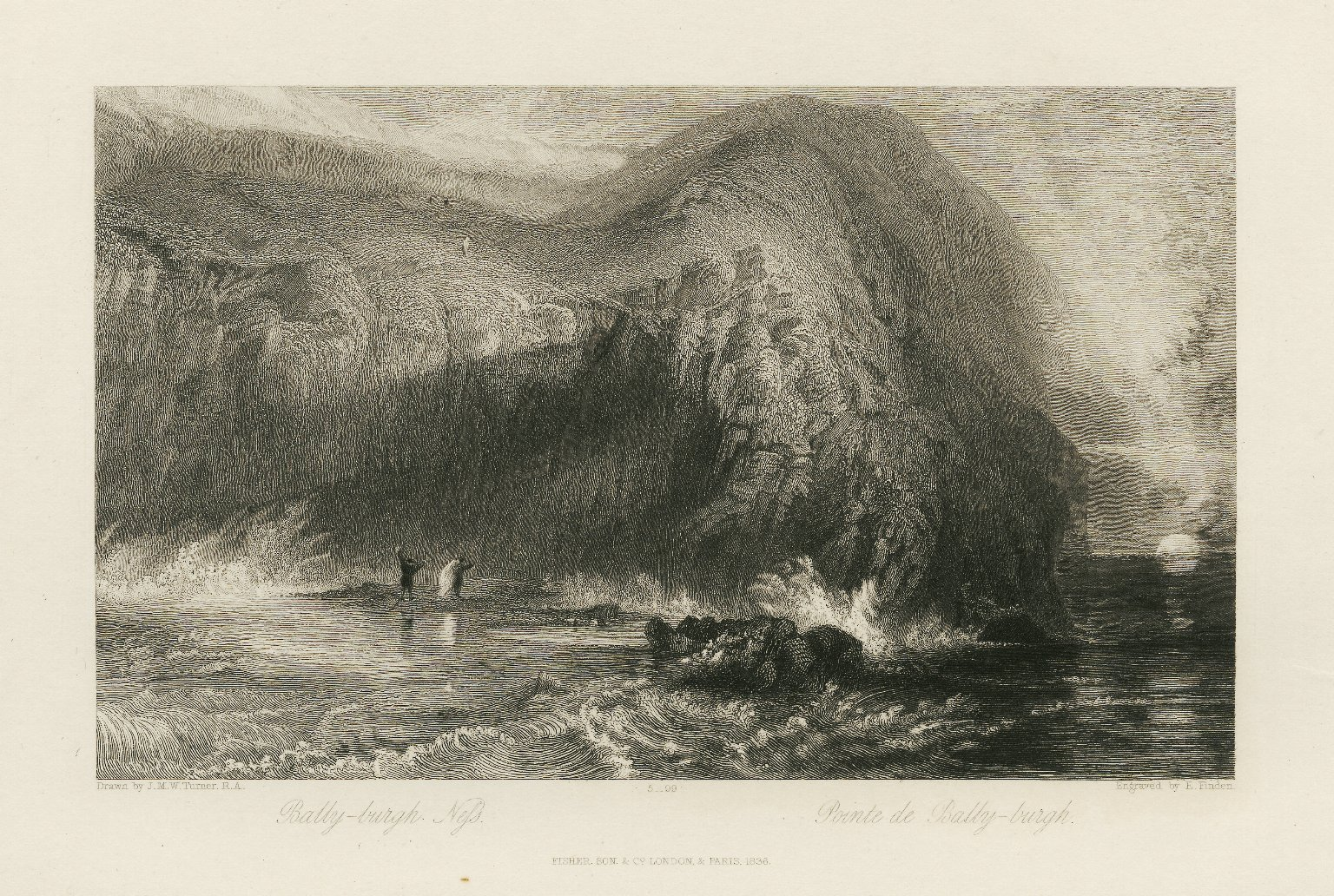
Depicts Edie Ochiletree guiding Sir Arthur and Isabella Wardour through the storm from Chapter 7 of The Antiquary

Scott was an almost exclusively historical novelist. Only one of his 27 novels – Saint Ronan's Well – has a wholly modern setting. The settings of the others range from 1794 in The Antiquary back to 1096 or 1097, the time of the First Crusade, in Count Robert of Paris. Sixteen take place in Scotland. The first nine, from Waverley (1814) to A Legend of Montrose (1819), all have Scottish locations and 17th- or 18th-century settings. Scott was better versed in his material than anyone: he could draw on oral tradition and a wide range of written sources in his ever-expanding library (many of the books rare and some unique copies). In general it is these pre-1820 novels that have drawn the attention of modern critics – especially: Waverley, with its presentation of the 1745 Jacobites drawn from the Highland clans as obsolete and fanatical idealists; Old Mortality (1816) with its treatment of the 1679 Covenanters as fanatical and often ridiculous (prompting John Galt to produce a contrasting picture in his novel Ringan Gilhaize in 1823); The Heart of Mid-Lothian (1818) with its low-born heroine Jeanie Deans making a perilous journey to Richmond in 1737 to secure a promised royal pardon for her sister, falsely accused of infanticide; and the tragic The Bride of Lammermoor (1819), with its stern account of a declined aristocratic family, with Edgar Ravenswood and his fiancée as victims of the wife of an upstart lawyer in a time of political power-struggle before the Act of Union in 1707.

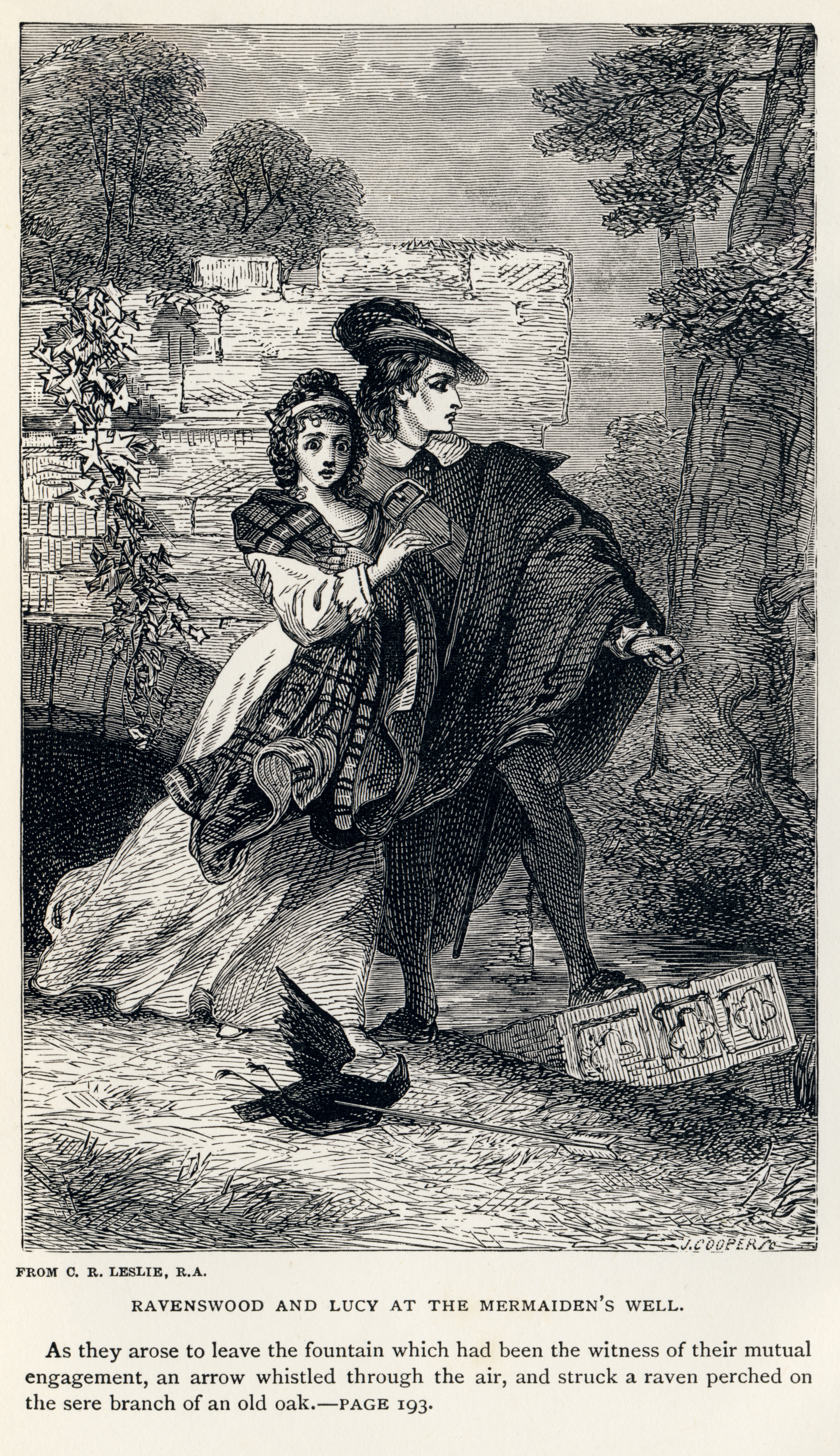
"Edgar and Lucie at Mermaiden's well" by Charles Robert Leslie (1886), after Sir Walter Scott's Bride of Lammermoor. Lucie is wearing a full plaid.

In 1820, in a bold move, Scott shifted period and location for Ivanhoe (1820) to 12th-century England. This meant he was dependent on a limited range of sources, all of them printed: he had to bring together material from different centuries and invent an artificial form of speech based on Elizabethan and Jacobean drama. The result is as much myth as history, but the novel remains his best-known work, the most likely to be found by the general reader. Eight of the subsequent 17 novels also have medieval settings, though most are set towards the end of the era, for which Scott had a better supply of contemporaneous sources. His familiarity with Elizabethan and 17th-century English literature, partly resulting from editorial work on pamphlets and other minor publications, meant that four of his works set in the England of that period – Kenilworth (1821), The Fortunes of Nigel and Peveril of the Peak (1821), and Woodstock (1826) – present rich pictures of their societies. The most generally esteemed of Scott's later fictions, though, are three short stories: a supernatural narrative in Scots, "Wandering Willie's Tale" in Redgauntlet (1824), and "The Highland Widow" and "The Two Drovers" in Chronicles of the Canongate (1827).

Crucial to Scott's historical thinking is the concept that very different societies can move through the same stages as they develop, and that humanity is basically unchanging, or as he puts it in the first chapter of Waverley that there are "passions common to men in all stages of society, and which have alike agitated the human heart, whether it throbbed under the steel corslet of the fifteenth century, the brocaded coat of the eighteenth, or the blue frock and white dimity waistcoat of the present day." It was one of Scott's main achievements to give lively, detailed pictures of different stages of Scottish, British, and European society while making it clear that for all the differences in form, they took the same human passions as those of his own age. His readers could therefore appreciate the depiction of an unfamiliar society, while having no difficulty in relating to the characters.

Scott is fascinated by striking moments of transition between stages in societies. Samuel Taylor Coleridge, in a discussion of Scott's early novels, found that they derive their "long-sustained interest" from "the contest between the two great moving Principles of social Humanity – religious adherence to the Past and the Ancient, the Desire & the admiration of Permanence, on the one hand; and the Passion for increase of Knowledge, for Truth as the offspring of Reason, in short, the mighty Instincts of Progression and Free-agency, on the other." This is clear, for example, in Waverley, as the hero is captivated by the romantic allure of the Jacobite cause embodied in Bonnie Prince Charlie and his followers before accepting that the time for such enthusiasms has passed and accepting the more rational, humdrum reality of Hanoverian Britain. Another example appears in 15th-century Europe in the yielding of the old chivalric world view of Charles, Duke of Burgundy, to the Machiavellian pragmatism of Louis XI. Scott is intrigued by the way different stages of societal development can exist side by side in one country. When Waverley has his first experience of Highland ways after a raid on his Lowland host's cattle, it "seemed like a dream ... that these deeds of violence should be familiar to men's minds, and currently talked of, as falling with the common order of things, and happening daily in the immediate neighbourhood, without his having crossed the seas, and while he was yet in the otherwise well-ordered island of Great Britain." A more complex version of this comes in Scott's second novel, Guy Mannering (1815), which "set in 1781‒2, offers no simple opposition: the Scotland represented in the novel is at once backward and advanced, traditional and modern – it is a country in varied stages of progression in which there are many social subsets, each with its own laws and customs."

Scott's process of composition can be traced through the manuscripts (mostly preserved), the more fragmentary sets of proofs, his correspondence, and publisher's records. He did not create detailed plans for his stories, and the remarks by the figure of "the Author" in the Introductory Epistle to The Fortunes of Nigel probably reflect his own experience: "I think there is a dæmon who seats himself on the feather of my pen when I begin to write, and leads it astray from the purpose. Characters expand under my hand; incidents are multiplied; the story lingers, while the materials increase – my regular mansion turns out a Gothic anomaly, and the work is complete long before I have attained the point I proposed." Yet the manuscripts rarely show major deletions or changes of direction, and Scott could clearly keep control of his narrative. That was important, for as soon as he had made fair progress with a novel he would start sending batches of manuscript to be copied (to preserve his anonymity), and the copies were sent to be set up in type. (As usual at the time, the compositors would supply the punctuation.) He received proofs, also in batches, and made many changes at that stage, but these were almost always local corrections and enhancements.

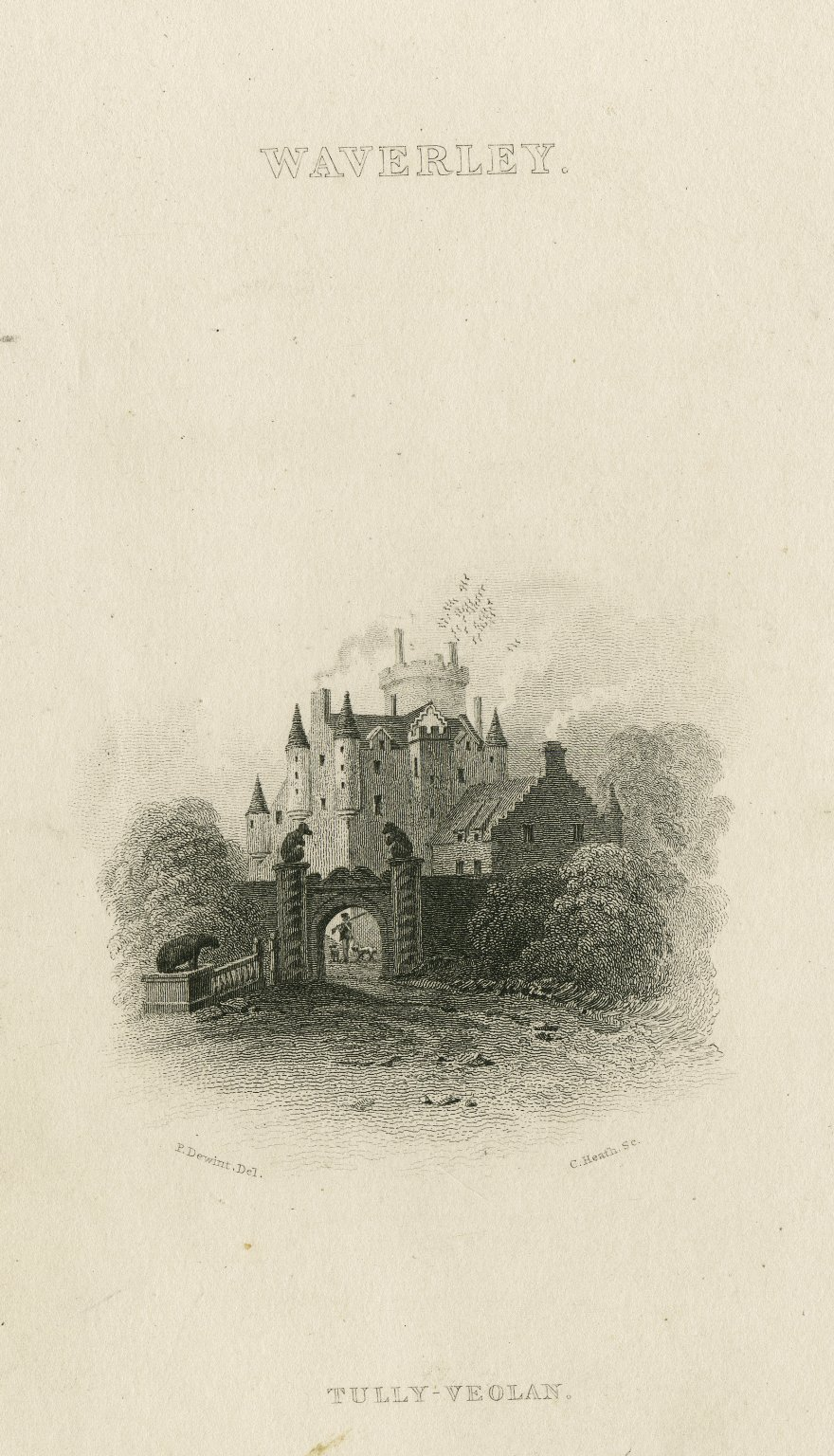
Steel engraving by C. Heath after a drawing by P. De Wint of a scene relating to Scott's novel Waverley, 1832. The University of Edinburgh Collections.

As the number of novels grew, they were republished in small collections: Novels and Tales (1819: Waverley to A Tale of Montrose); Historical Romances (1822: Ivanhoe to Kenilworth); Novels and Romances (1824 [1823]: The Pirate to Quentin Durward); and two series of Tales and Romances (1827: St Ronan's Well to Woodstock; 1833: Chronicles of the Canongate to Castle Dangerous). In his last years Scott marked up interleaved copies of these collected editions to produce a final version of what were now officially the Waverley Novels, often called his 'Magnum Opus' or 'Magnum Edition'. Scott provided each novel with an introduction and notes and made mostly piecemeal adjustments to the text. Issued in 48 smart monthly volumes between June 1829 and May 1833 at a modest price of five shillings (60p) these were an innovative and profitable venture aimed at a wide readership: the print run was an astonishing 30,000.

In a "General Preface" to the "Magnum Edition", Scott wrote that one factor prompting him to resume work on the Waverley manuscript in 1813 had been a desire to do for Scotland what had been done in the fiction of Maria Edgeworth, "whose Irish characters have gone so far to make the English familiar with the character of their gay and kind-hearted neighbours of Ireland, that she may be truly said to have done more towards completing the Union, than perhaps all the legislative enactments by which it has been followed up [the Act of Union of 1801]." Most of Scott's readers were English: with Quentin Durward (1823) and Woodstock (1826), for example, some 8000 of the 10,000 copies of the first edition went to London. In the Scottish novels the lower-class characters normally speak Scots, but Scott is careful not to make the Scots too dense, so that those unfamiliar with it can follow the gist without understanding every word. Some have also argued that although Scott was formally a supporter of the Union with England (and Ireland) his novels have a strong nationalist subtext for readers attuned to that wavelength.

Scott's new career as a novelist in 1814 did not mean he abandoned poetry. The Waverley Novels contain much original verse, including familiar songs such as "Proud Maisie" from The Heart of Mid-Lothian (Ch. 41) and "Look not thou on Beauty's charming" from The Bride of Lammermoor (Ch. 3). In most of the novels Scott preceded each chapter with an epigram or "motto"; most of these are in verse, and many are of his own composition, often imitating other writers such as Beaumont and Fletcher.

== Recovery of the Crown Jewels, baronetcy, and ceremonial pageantry ==
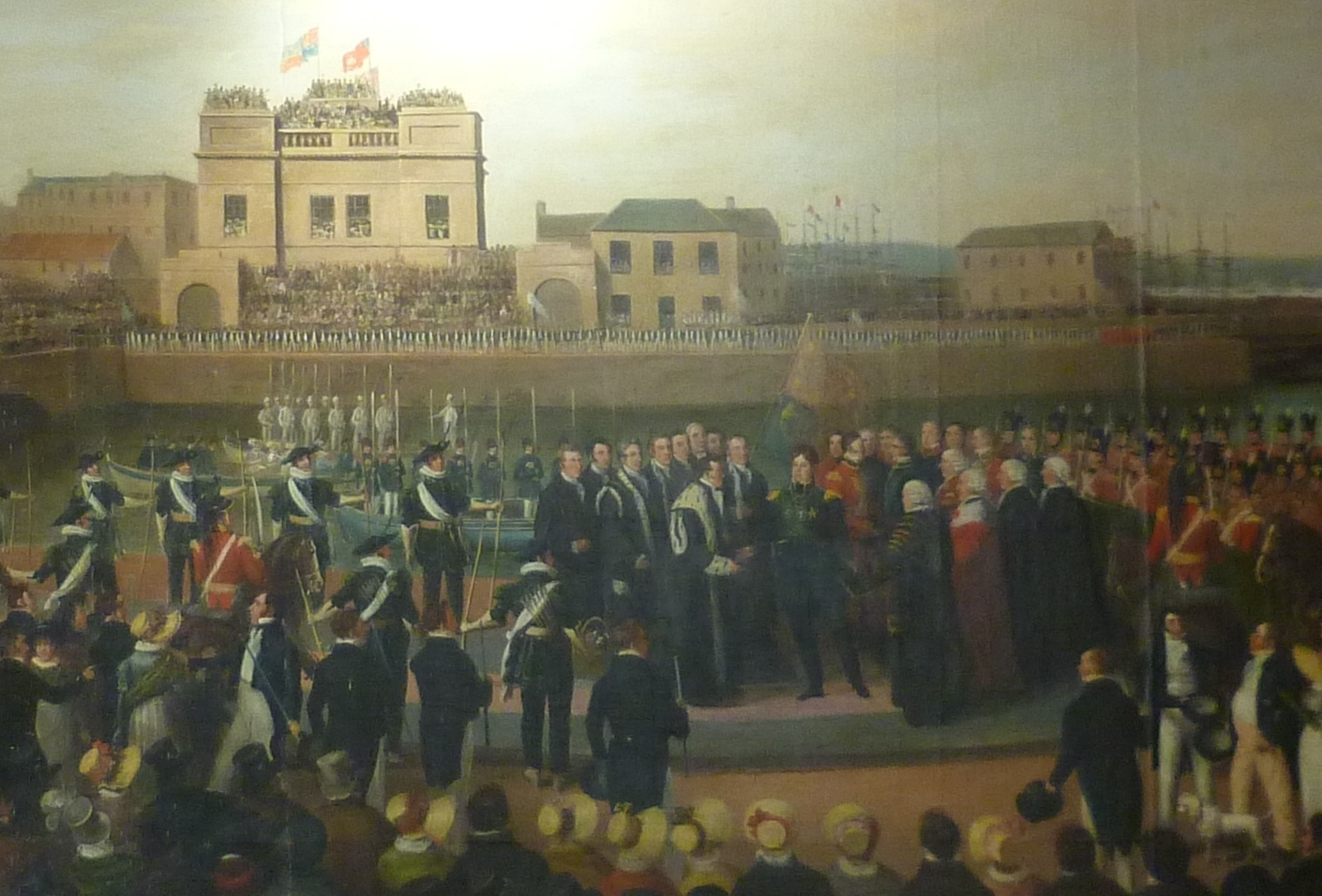
George IV landing at Leith in 1822

Prompted by Scott, the Prince Regent (the future George IV) gave Scott and other officials permission in a Royal Warrant dated 28 October 1817 to conduct a search for the Crown Jewels ("Honours of Scotland"). During the Protectorate under Oliver Cromwell these had been hidden away, but had subsequently been used to crown Charles II. They were not used to crown subsequent monarchs, but were regularly taken to sittings of Parliament, to represent the absent monarch, until the Act of Union 1707. So the honours were stored in Edinburgh Castle, but their large locked box was not opened for more than 100 years, and stories circulated that they had been "lost" or removed. On 4 February 1818, Scott and a small military team opened the box and "unearthed" the honours from the Crown Room of Edinburgh Castle. On 19 August 1818 through Scott's effort, his friend Adam Ferguson was appointed Deputy Keeper of the "Scottish Regalia". The Scottish patronage system swung into action and after elaborate negotiations the Prince Regent granted Scott the title of baronet: in April 1820 he received the baronetcy in London, becoming Sir Walter Scott, 1st Baronet.

After George's accession, the city council of Edinburgh invited Scott, at the sovereign's behest, to stage-manage the 1822 visit of George IV to Scotland. In spite of having only three weeks to work with, Scott created a comprehensive pageant, designed not only to impress the King, but in some way to heal the rifts that had destabilised Scots society. Probably fortified by his vivid depiction of the pageant staged for the reception of Queen Elizabeth in Kenilworth he and his "production team" mounted what in modern days would be a public-relations event, with the King dressed in tartan and greeted by his people, many of them also in similar tartan ceremonial dress. This form of dress, proscribed after the Jacobite rising of 1745, became one of the seminal, potent and ubiquitous symbols of Scottish identity.

Coat of arms of Sir Walter Scott
Crest A nymph, in her dexter hand a sun in splendour, in her sinister a crescent (moon) Escutcheon Quarterly; 1st & 4th or two mullets in chief and a crescent in base azure within an orle azure (Scott); 2nd & 3rd or on a bend azure three mascles or, in sinister chief point a buckle azure (Haliburton); escutcheon of the Hand of Ulster Supporters Dexter a mermaid holding in the exterior hand a mirror proper; Sinister a "Moor proper banded and cinctured argent holding in his left hand, a flaming torch lowered proper" Motto (above) Reparabit cornua phoebe – the moon shall fill her horns again (below) Watch weel

== Financial problems and death ==
In 1825 a British banking crisis resulted in the collapse of the Ballantyne printing business, of which Scott was the only partner with a financial interest. Its debts of £130,000 (equivalent to £10,500,000 in 2025) caused his very public ruin. Rather than declare himself bankrupt or accept any financial support from his many supporters and admirers (including the King himself), he placed his house and income in a trust belonging to his creditors and set out to write his way out of debt. To add to his burdens, his wife Charlotte died in 1826.

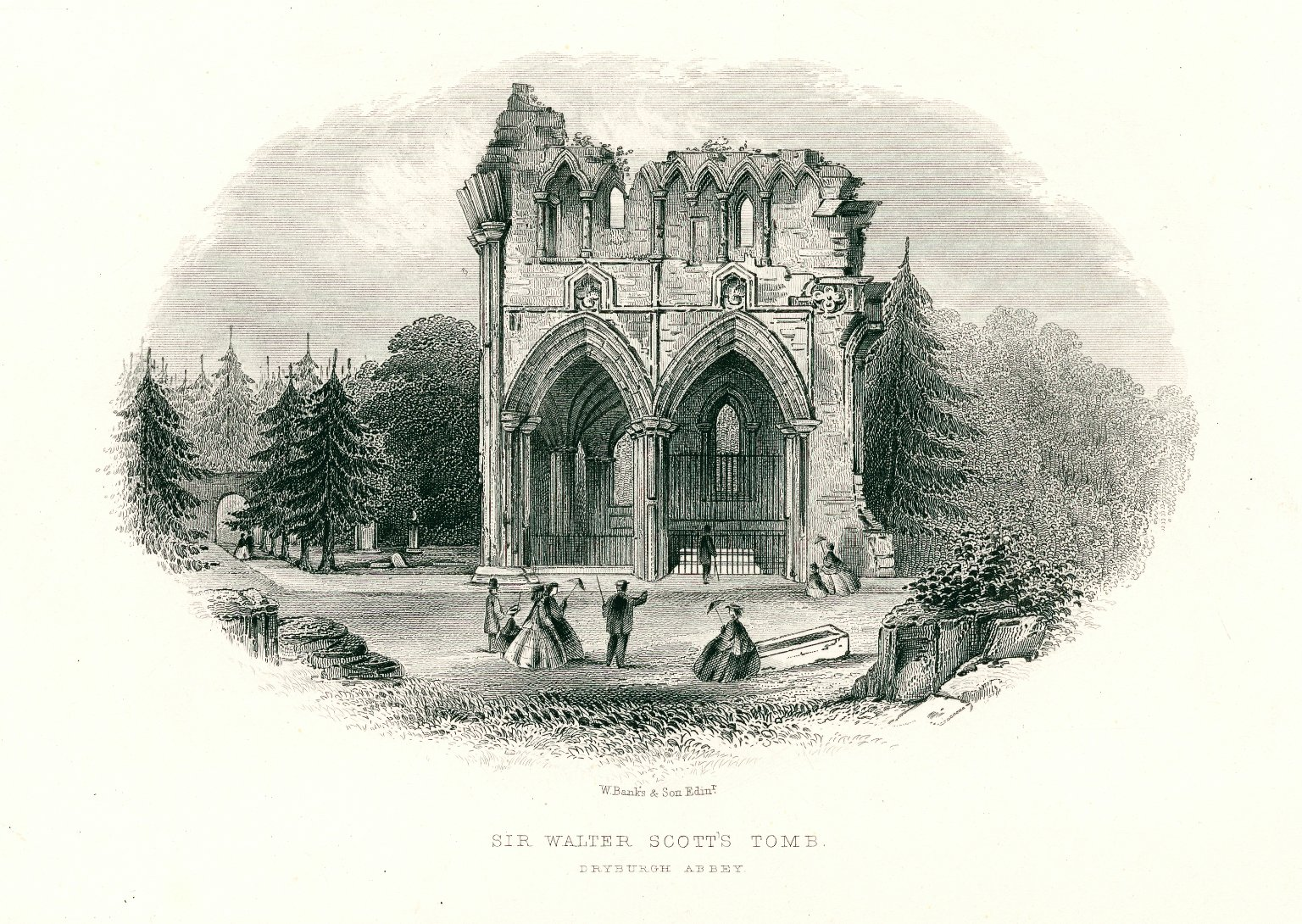
Walter Scott's Tomb at Dryburgh Abbey

Despite these events or because of them, Scott kept up his prodigious output. Between 1826 and 1832 he produced six novels, two short stories and two plays, eleven works or volumes of non-fiction, and a journal, along with several unfinished works. The non-fiction included The Life of Napoleon Buonaparte in 1827, two volumes of the History of Scotland in 1829 and 1830, and four instalments of the series entitled Tales of a Grandfather – Being Stories Taken From Scottish History, written one per year over the period 1828–1831, among several others. Finally, Scott had recently been inspired by the diaries of Samuel Pepys and Lord Byron, and he began keeping a journal over the period, which was published in 1890 as The Journal of Sir Walter Scott.

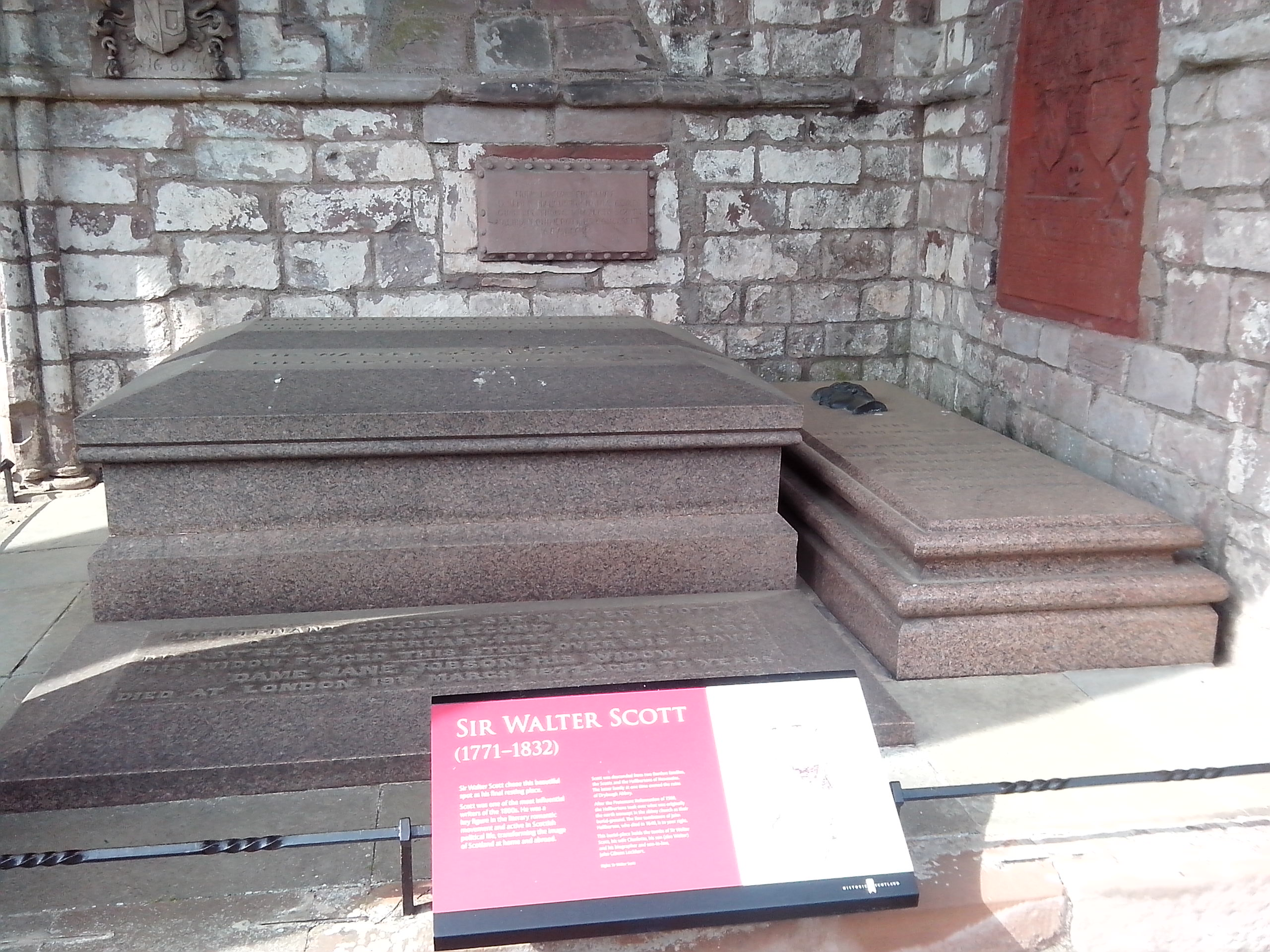
Sir Walter Scott's grave at Dryburgh Abbey – the largest tomb is that of Sir Walter and Lady Scott. The engraved slab covers the grave of their son, Lt Col Sir Walter Scott. On the right is their son-in-law and biographer, John Gibson Lockhart.

By then Scott's health was failing, and on 29 October 1831, in a vain search for improvement, he set off on a voyage to Malta and Naples aboard HMS Barham, a frigate put at his disposal by the Admiralty. He was welcomed and celebrated wherever he went. On his journey home he boarded the steamboat Prins Frederik going from Cologne to Rotterdam. While on board he had a final stroke near Emmerich. After local treatment, a steamboat took him to the steamship Batavier, which left for England on 12 June. By coincidence, the writer Mary Martha Sherwood was also on board. She would later write about this encounter. After he was landed in England, Scott was transported back to die at Abbotsford on 21 September 1832. He was 61.

Scott was buried in Dryburgh Abbey, where his wife had earlier been interred. Lady Scott had been buried as an Episcopalian; at Scott's own funeral, three ministers of the Church of Scotland officiated at Abbotsford and the service at Dryburgh was conducted by an Episcopal clergyman.

Although Scott died owing money, his novels continued to sell, and the debts encumbering his estate were discharged shortly after his death.

== Religion ==
Scott was raised as a Presbyterian in the Church of Scotland. He was ordained as an elder in Duddingston Kirk in 1806, and sat in the General Assembly for a time as representative elder of the burgh of Selkirk. In adult life he also adhered to the Scottish Episcopal Church: he seldom attended church but read the Book of Common Prayer services in family worship.

Scott was one of the last individuals cursed by the Muggletonian movement on account of his reviling Muggletonianism.

== Freemasonry ==
Scott's father was a Freemason, being a member of Lodge St David, No. 36 (Edinburgh), and Scott also became a Freemason in his father's Lodge in 1801, albeit only after the death of his father.

== Abbotsford House ==
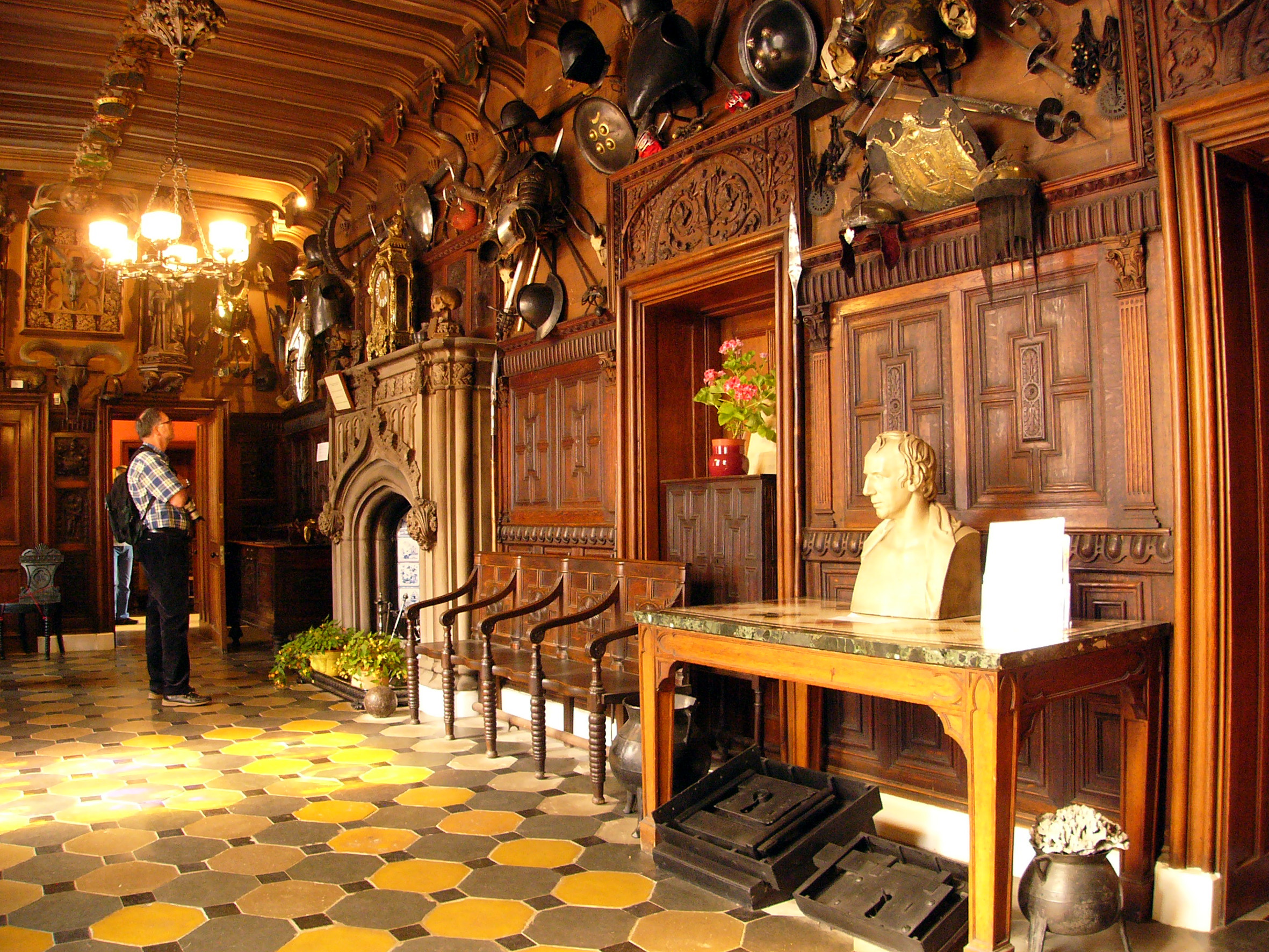
Abbotsford House

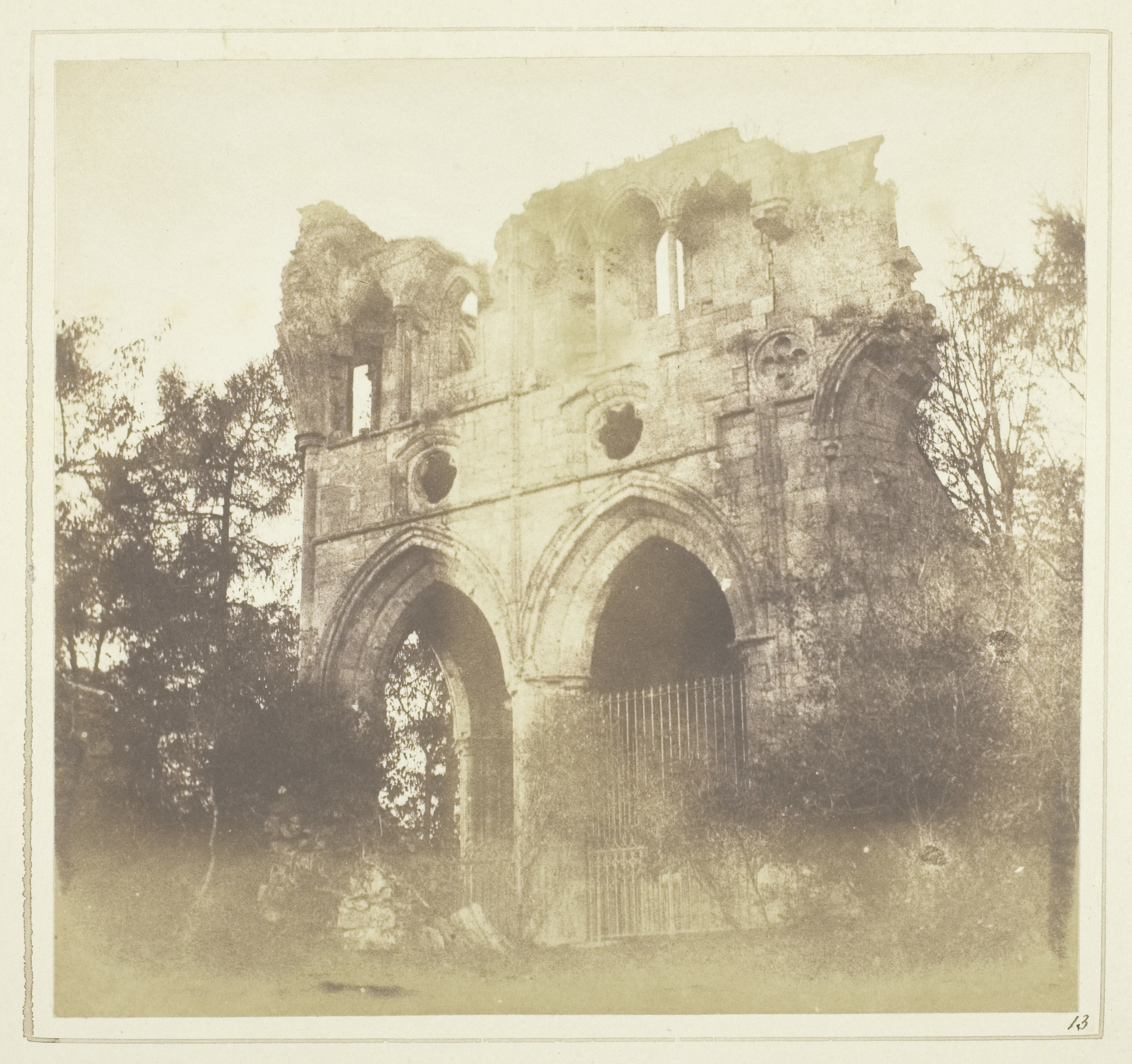
Tomb of Walter Scott, in Dryburgh Abbey, photo by Henry Fox Talbot, 1844

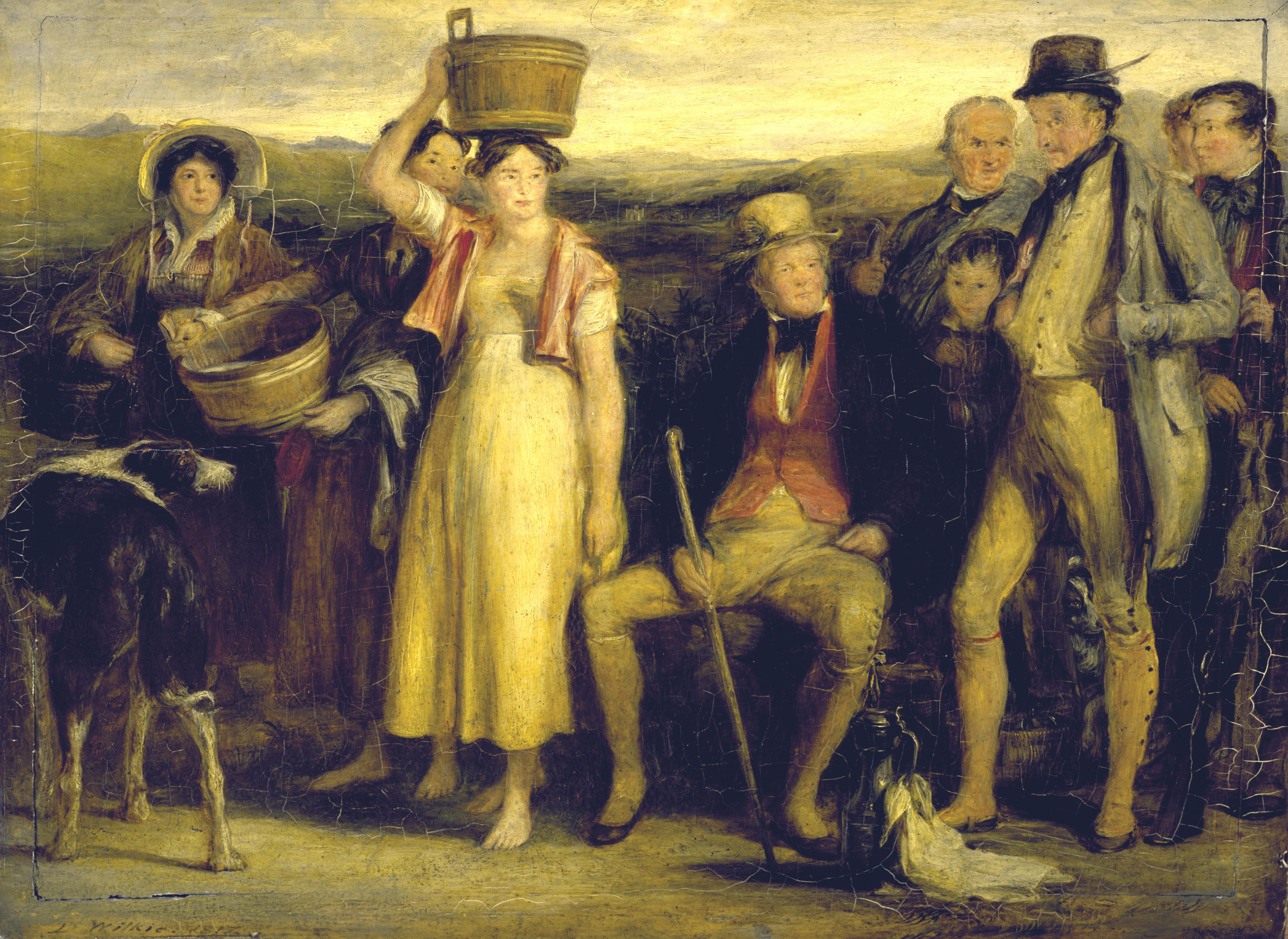
The Abbotsford Family by Sir David Wilkie, 1817, depicting Scott and his family dressed as country folk, with his wife and two daughters dressed as milkmaids

When Scott was a boy, he sometimes travelled with his father from Selkirk to Melrose, where some of his novels are set. At a certain spot, the old gentleman would stop the carriage and take his son to a stone on the site of the Battle of Melrose (1526).

During the summers from 1804, Scott made his home at the large house of Ashestiel, on the south bank of the River Tweed, 6 miles (9.7 km) north of Selkirk. When his lease on this property expired in 1811, he bought Cartley Hole Farm, downstream on the Tweed nearer Melrose. The farm had the nickname of "Clarty Hole", and Scott renamed it "Abbotsford" after a neighbouring ford used by the monks of Melrose Abbey. Following a modest enlargement of the original farmhouse in 1811–12, massive expansions took place in 1816–19 and 1822–24. Scott described the resulting building as 'a sort of romance in Architecture' and 'a kind of Conundrum Castle to be sure'. With his architects William Atkinson and Edward Blore Scott was a pioneer of the Scottish Baronial style of architecture, and Abbotsford is festooned with turrets and stepped gabling. Through windows enriched with the insignia of heraldry the sun shone on suits of armour, trophies of the chase, a library of more than 9,000 volumes, fine furniture, and still finer pictures. Panelling of oak and cedar and carved ceilings relieved by coats of arms in their correct colours added to the beauty of the house.

It is estimated that the building cost Scott more than £25,000 (equivalent to £2,000,000 in 2025). More land was purchased until Scott owned nearly 1,000 acres (4.0 km^{2}). In 1817 as part of the land purchases Scott bought the nearby mansion-house of Toftfield for his friend Adam Ferguson to live in along with his brothers and sisters and on which, at the ladies' request, he bestowed the name of Huntlyburn. Ferguson commissioned Sir David Wilkie to paint the Scott family resulting in the painting The Abbotsford Family in which Scott is seated with his family represented as a group of country folk. Ferguson is standing to the right with the feather in his cap and Thomas Scott, Scott's Uncle, is behind. The painting was exhibited at the Royal Academy in 1818.

Abbotsford later gave its name to the Abbotsford Club, founded in 1834 in memory of Sir Walter Scott.

== Reputation ==
=== Later assessment ===
Although he continued to be extremely popular and widely read, both at home and abroad, Scott's critical reputation declined in the last half of the 19th century as serious writers turned from romanticism to realism, and Scott began to be regarded as an author suitable for children. This trend accelerated in the 20th century. For example, in his classic study Aspects of the Novel (1927), E. M. Forster harshly criticized Scott's clumsy and slapdash writing style, "flat" characters, and thin plots. In contrast, the novels of Scott's contemporary Jane Austen, once appreciated only by a discerning few (including, as it happened, Scott himself) rose steadily in critical esteem, though Austen, as a female writer, was still faulted for her narrow ("feminine") choice of subject matter, which, unlike Scott, avoided the grand historical themes traditionally viewed as masculine.

Nevertheless, Scott's importance as an innovator continued to be recognised. He was acclaimed as the inventor of the genre of the modern historical novel (which others trace to Jane Porter, whose work in the genre predates Scott's) and the inspiration for enormous numbers of imitators and genre writers both in Britain and on the European continent. In the cultural sphere, Scott's Waverley novels played a significant part in the movement (begun with James Macpherson's Ossian cycle) in rehabilitating the public perception of the Scottish Highlands and its culture, which had formerly been viewed by the southern mind as a barbaric breeding ground of hill bandits, religious fanaticism, and Jacobite risings.

Scott served as chairman of the Royal Society of Edinburgh and was also a member of the Royal Celtic Society. His own contribution to the reinvention of Scottish culture was enormous, even though his re-creations of the customs of the Highlands were fanciful at times. Through the medium of Scott's novels, the violent religious and political conflicts of the country's recent past could be seen as belonging to history—which Scott defined, as the subtitle of Waverley ("'Tis Sixty Years Since") indicates, as something that happened at least 60 years earlier. His advocacy of objectivity and moderation and his strong repudiation of political violence on either side also had a strong, though unspoken, contemporary resonance in an era when many conservative English speakers lived in mortal fear of a revolution in the French style on British soil. Scott's orchestration of King George IV's visit to Scotland, in 1822, was a pivotal event intended to inspire a view of his home country that accentuated the positive aspects of the past while allowing the age of quasi-medieval blood-letting to be put to rest, while envisioning a more useful, peaceful future.

After Scott's work had been essentially unstudied for many decades, a revival of critical interest began in the middle of the 20th century. While F. R. Leavis had disdained Scott, seeing him as a thoroughly bad novelist and a thoroughly bad influence (The Great Tradition [1948]), György Lukács (The Historical Novel [1937, trans. 1962]) and David Daiches (Scott's Achievement as a Novelist [1951]) offered a Marxian political reading of Scott's fiction that generated a great deal of interest in his work. These were followed in 1966 by a major thematic analysis covering most of the novels by Francis R. Hart (Scott's Novels: The Plotting of Historic Survival). Scott has proved particularly responsive to Postmodern approaches, most notably to the concept of the interplay of multiple voices highlighted by Mikhail Bakhtin, as suggested by the title of the volume with selected papers from the Fourth International Scott Conference held in Edinburgh in 1991, Scott in Carnival. Scott is now increasingly recognised not only as the principal inventor of the historical novel and a key figure in the development of Scottish and world literature, but also as a writer of a depth and subtlety who challenges his readers as well as entertaining them.

=== Memorials and commemoration ===
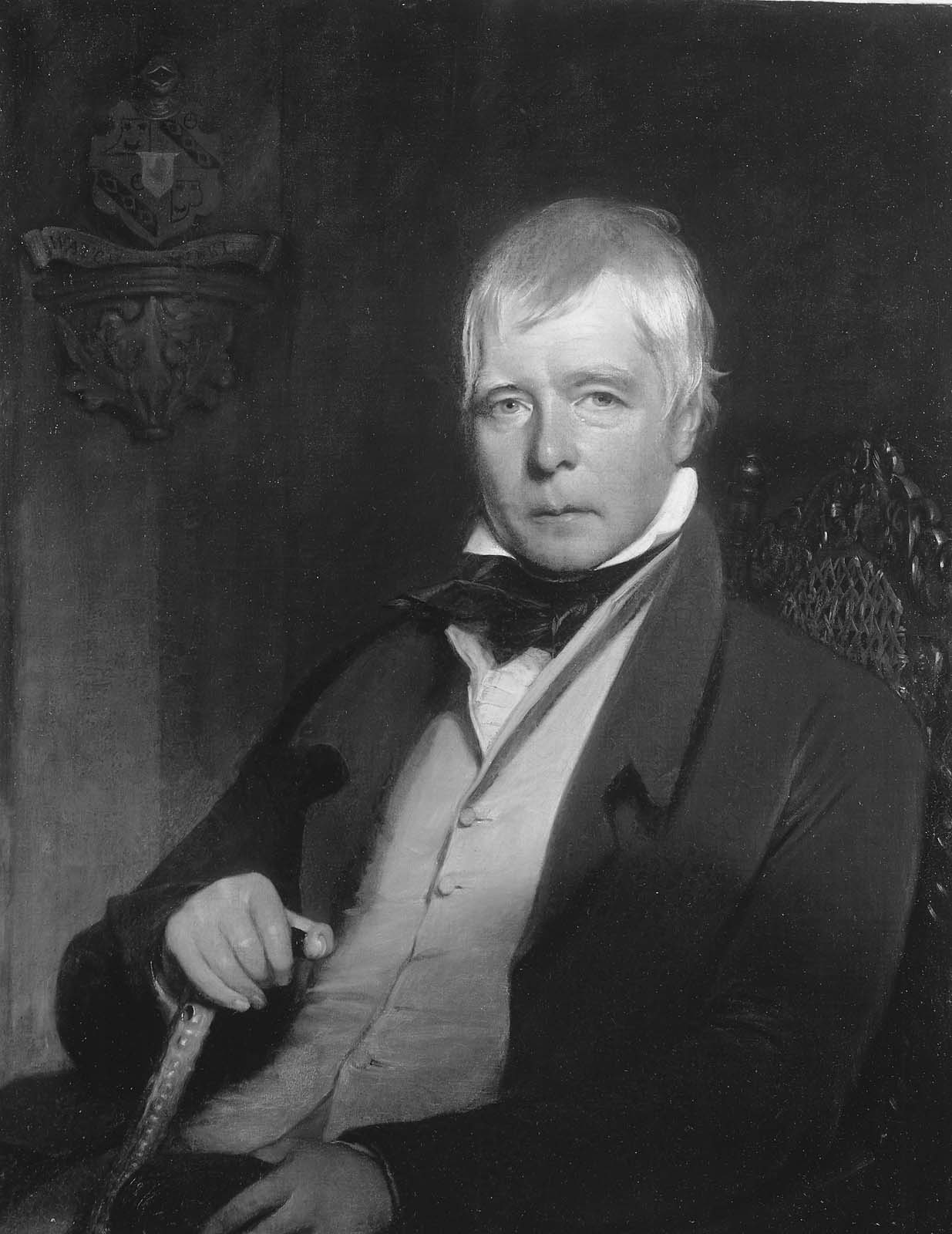
Painted by Charles Robert Leslie 1824. Engraved by M I Danforth in 1829

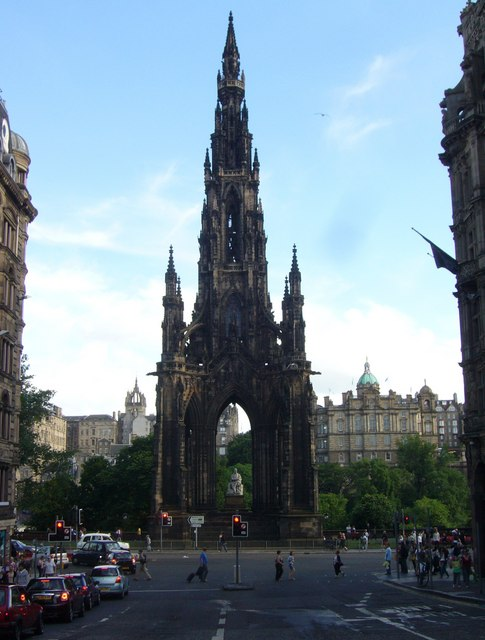
The Scott Monument on Edinburgh's Princes Street

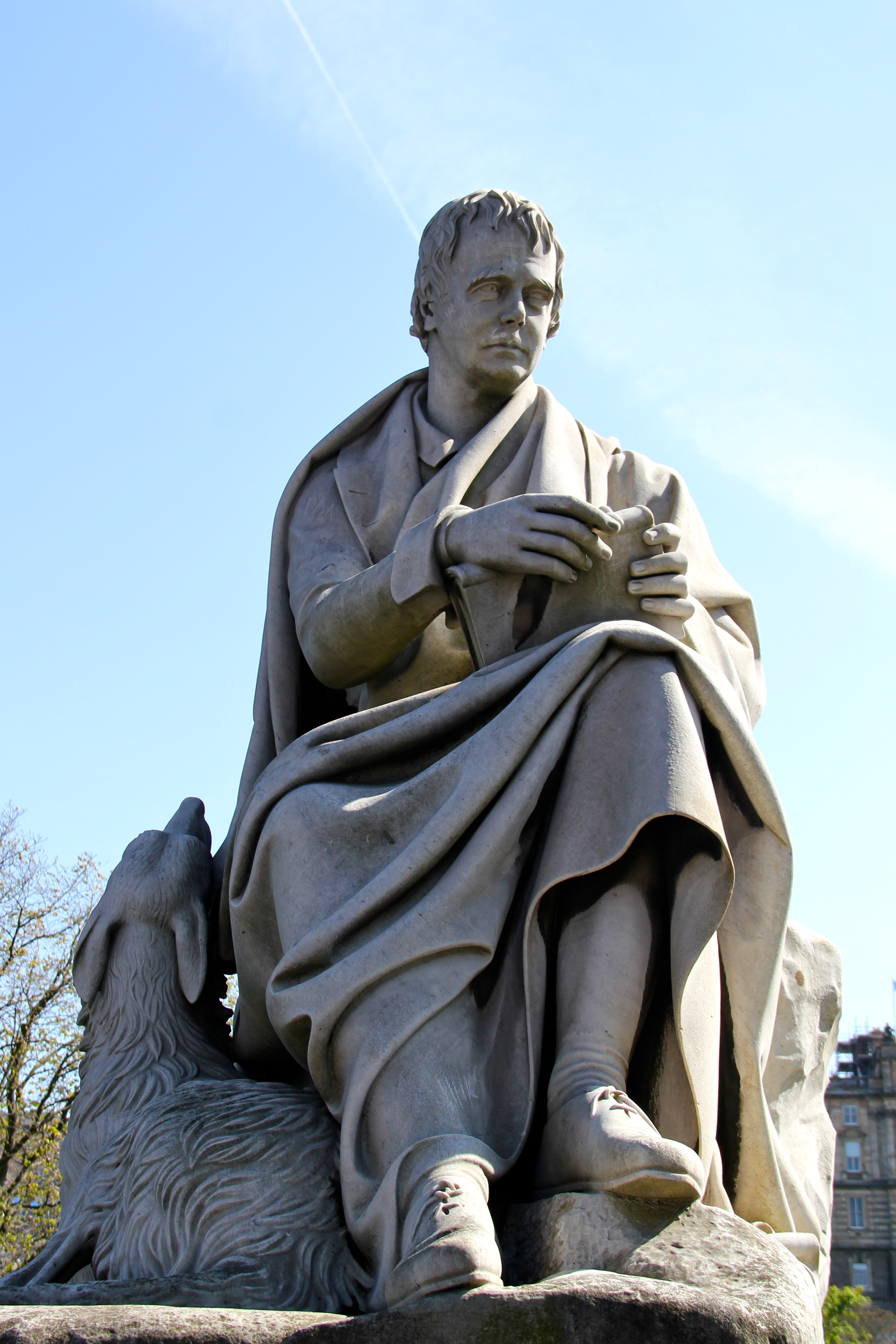
Statue by Sir John Steell on the Scott Monument in Edinburgh

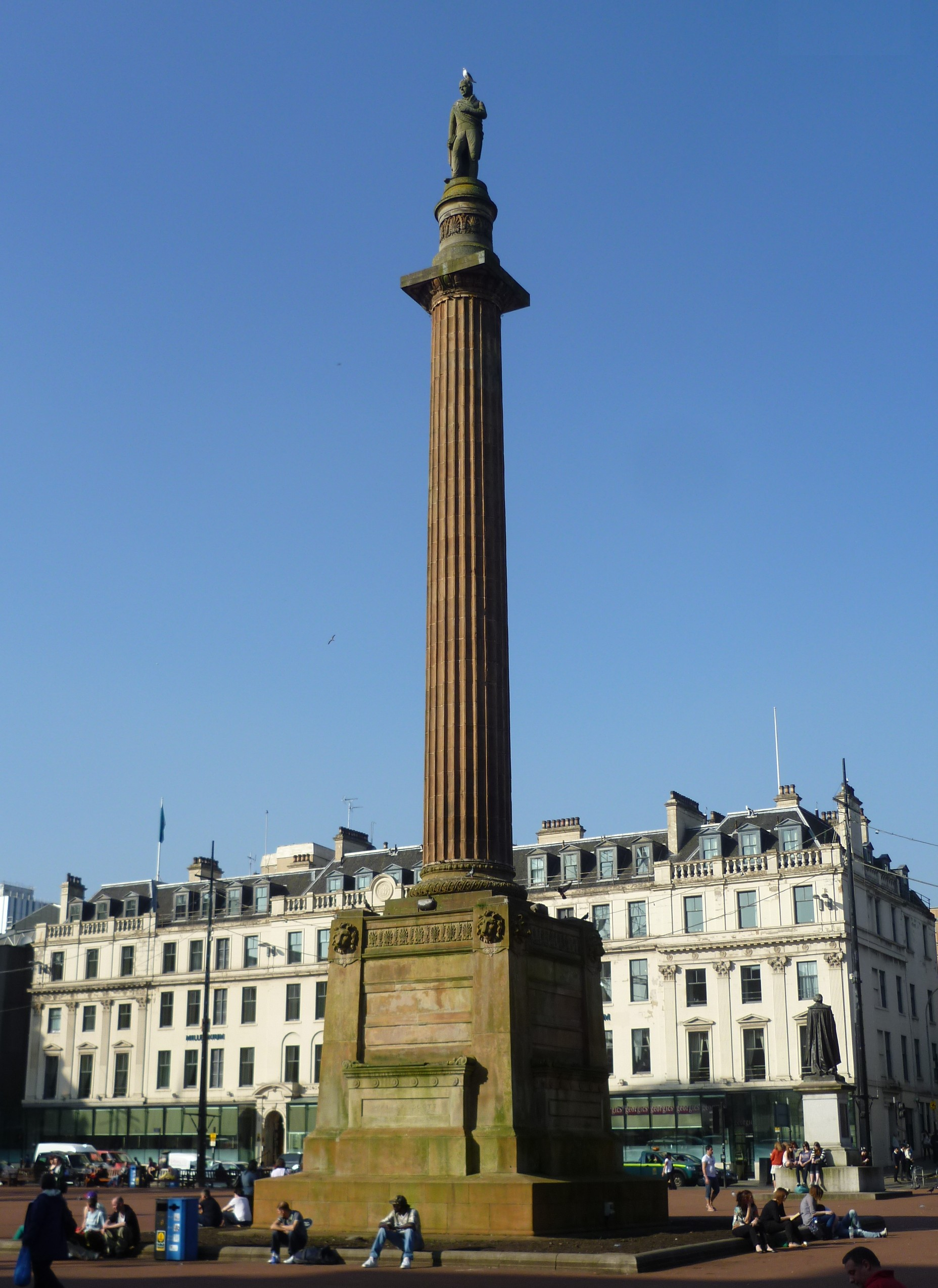
Scott Monument in Glasgow's George Square

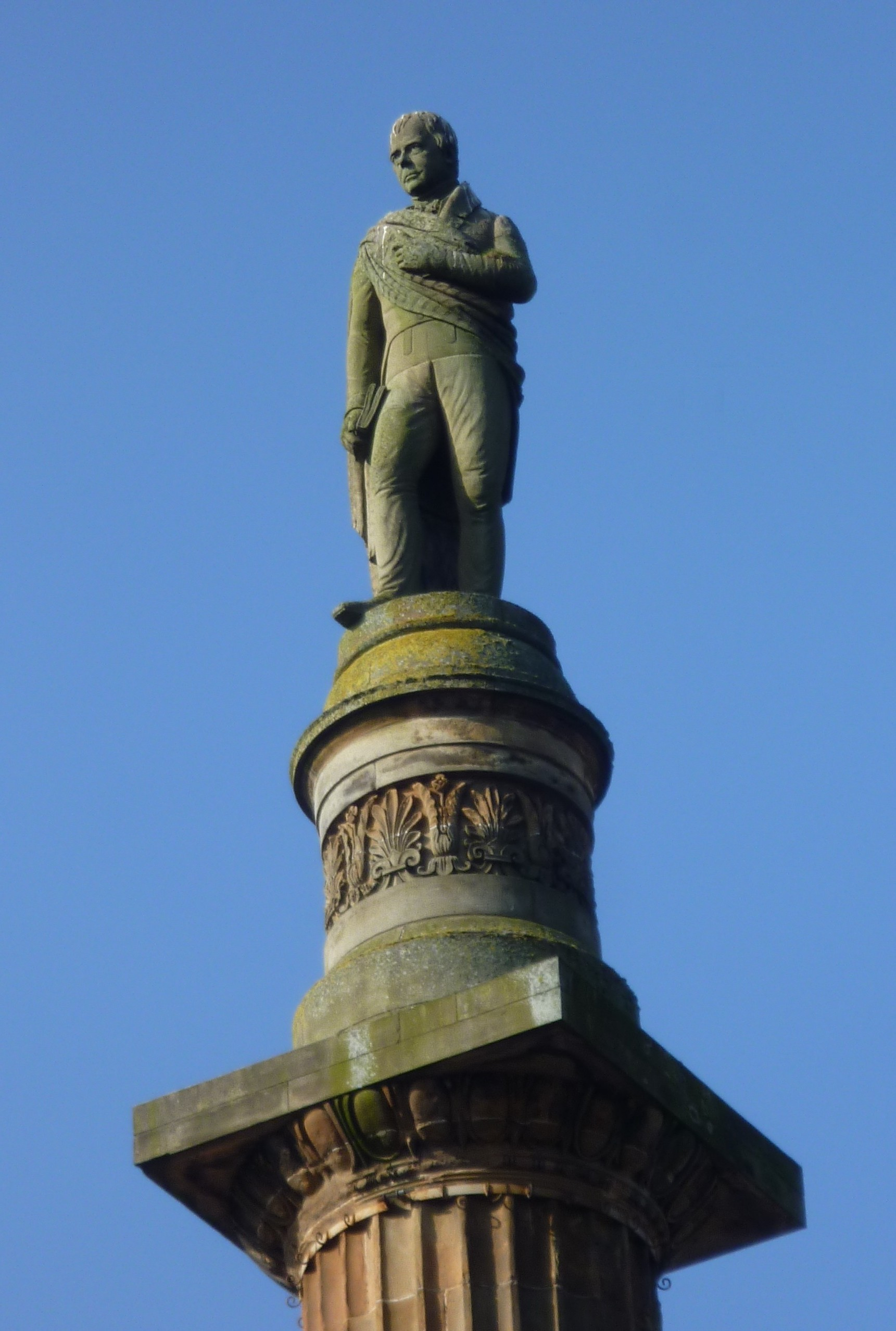
Statue on the Glasgow monument

During his lifetime, Scott's portrait was painted by Sir Edwin Landseer and his fellow-Scots Sir Henry Raeburn and James Eckford Lauder, and in 1824 by the American painter Charles Robert Leslie, later engraved by M I Danforth in 1829. After Watts Souvenir of 1829 was published Close friends and family said "That it was the best engraving that had yet appeared of the likeness of the author of Waverley".

Post Scott's life, 1833, W J Thompson painted a miniature for a gold memorial locket shown in William John Thompson. In Edinburgh, the 61.1-metre-tall Victorian Gothic spire of the Scott Monument was designed by George Meikle Kemp. It was completed in 1844, 12 years after Scott's death, and dominates the south side of Princes Street. Scott is also commemorated on a stone slab in Makars' Court, outside The Writers' Museum, Lawnmarket, Edinburgh, along with other prominent Scottish writers; quotes from his work are also visible on the Canongate Wall of the Scottish Parliament building in Holyrood. There is a tower dedicated to his memory on Corstorphine Hill in the west of the city and Edinburgh's Waverley railway station, opened in 1854, takes its name from his first novel.

In Glasgow, Walter Scott's Monument dominates the centre of George Square, the main public square in the city. Designed by David Rhind in 1838, the monument features a large column topped by a statue of Scott. There is a statue of Scott in Central Park in New York City.

In 1837 his son-in-law John Gibson Lockhart published his nine-volume Memoirs of the Life of Sir Walter Scott, one of the two most influential literary biographies of the decade along with Thomas Moore's Life of Lord Byron.

Numerous Masonic Lodges have been named after Scott and his novels. For example: Lodge Sir Walter Scott, No. 859 (Perth, Australia) and Lodge Waverley, No. 597, (Edinburgh, Scotland).

The annual Walter Scott Prize for Historical Fiction was created in 2010 by the Duke and Duchess of Buccleuch, whose ancestors were closely linked to Sir Walter Scott. At £25,000, it is one of the largest prizes in British literature. The award has been presented at Scott's historic home, Abbotsford House.

Scott has been credited with rescuing the Scottish banknote. In 1826, there was outrage in Scotland at the attempt of Parliament to prevent the production of banknotes of less than five pounds. Scott wrote a series of letters to the Edinburgh Weekly Journal under the pseudonym "Malachi Malagrowther" for retaining the right of Scottish banks to issue their own banknotes. This provoked such a response that the Government was forced to relent and allow the Scottish banks to continue printing pound notes. This campaign is commemorated by his continued appearance on the front of all notes issued by the Bank of Scotland. The image on the 2007 series of banknotes is based on the portrait by Henry Raeburn.

In the United States, during and immediately after the First World War, there was a movement spearheaded by President Woodrow Wilson and other eminent people to inculcate patriotism in American schoolchildren, especially immigrants, and to stress the American connection with the literature and institutions of the "mother country" of Great Britain, using selected readings in middle school textbooks. Scott's Ivanhoe continued to be required reading for many American high-school students until the end of the 1950s.

A bust of Scott is in the Hall of Heroes of the National Wallace Monument in Stirling. Twelve streets in Vancouver, British Columbia are named after Scott's books or characters.

In the Inch district of Edinburgh, some 30 streets developed in the early 1950s are named for Scott (Sir Walter Scott Avenue) and for characters and places from his poems and novels. Examples include Saddletree Loan (after Bartoline Saddletree, a character in The Heart of Midlothian), Hazelwood Grove (after Charles Hazelwood, a character in Guy Mannering) and Redgauntlet Terrace (after the 1824 novel of that name).

== Influence ==
Walter Scott had an immense impact throughout Europe. "His historical fiction ... created for the first time a sense of the past as a place where people thought, felt and dressed differently". His historical romances "influenced Balzac, Dostoevsky, Flaubert, Tolstoy, Dumas, Pushkin, and many others; and his interpretation of history was seized on by Romantic nationalists, particularly in Eastern Europe". Also highly influential were the early translations into French by Auguste Defauconpret.

Letitia Elizabeth Landon was a great admirer of Scott and, on his death, she wrote two tributes to him: On Walter Scott in the Literary Gazette, and Sir Walter Scott in Fisher's Drawing Room Scrap Book, 1833. Towards the end of her life she began a series called The Female Picture Gallery with a series of character analyses based on the women in Scott's works.

Victor Hugo, in his 1823 essay, Sir Walter Scott: Apropos of Quentin Durward, writes:

Surely there is something strange and marvelous in the talent of this man who disposes of his reader as the wind disposes of a leaf; who leads him at his will into all places and into all times; unveils for him with ease the most secret recesses of the heart, as well as the most mysterious phenomena of nature, as well as the obscurest pages of history; whose imagination caresses and dominates all other imaginations, clothes with the same astonishing truth the beggar with his rags and the king with his robes, assumes all manners, adopts all garbs, speaks all languages; leaves to the physiognomy of the ages all that is immutable and eternal in their lineaments, traced there by the wisdom of God, and all that is variable and fleeting, planted there by the follies of men; does not force, like certain ignorant romancers, the personages of the past to colour themselves with our brushes and smear themselves with our varnish; but compels, by his magic power, the contemporary reader to imbue himself, at least for some hours, with the spirit of the old times, today so much scorned, like a wise and adroit adviser inviting ungrateful children to return to their father.

Alessandro Manzoni's The Betrothed (1827) has similarities with Scott's historic novel Ivanhoe, although evidently distinct.

In Charles Baudelaire's La Fanfarlo (1847), poet Samuel Cramer says of Scott:

Oh that tedious author, a dusty exhumer of chronicles! A fastidious mass of descriptions of bric-a-brac ... and castoff things of every sort, armor, tableware, furniture, gothic inns, and melodramatic castles where lifeless mannequins stalk about, dressed in leotards.

In the novella, however, Cramer proves as deluded a romantic as any hero in one of Scott's novels.

Jane Austen, in a letter to her nephew James Edward Austen on 16 December 1816, writes:

Uncle Henry writes very superior Sermons.– You & I must try to get hold of one or two, & put them into our Novels;– it would be a fine help to a volume; & we could make our Heroine read it aloud of a Sunday Evening, just as well as Isabella Wardour in the Antiquary, is made to read the History of the Hartz Demon in the ruins of St Ruth– tho' I believe, upon recollection, Lovell is the Reader.

In Austen's Persuasion (1817) Anne Elliot and Captain James Benwick discuss the "richness of the present age" of poetry, and whether Marmion or The Lady of the Lake is the more preferred work.

Mary Shelley, while researching for her historical novel The Fortunes of Perkin Warbeck (1830), wrote to Scott on 25 May 1829, asking him for information on any works or manuscripts he knew about Perkin Warbeck. She concludes the letter:

I hope you will forgive my troubling you. It is almost impertinent to say how foolish it appears to me that I should intrude on your ground, or to compliment one all the world so highly appreciates. But as every traveller when they visit the Alps endeavours, however imperfectly, to express their admiration in the Inn's album, so it is impossible to address the Author of Waverley without thanking him for the delight and instruction derived from the inexhaustible source of his genius, and trying to express a part of the enthusiastic admiration his works inspire.

In Charlotte Brontë's Jane Eyre (1847) St. John Rivers gives a copy of Marmion to Jane to provide her "evening solace" during her stay in her small lodging.

Emily Brontë's Wuthering Heights was influenced by the novels of Scott. In particular, according to Juliet Barker, Rob Roy (1817) had a significant influence on Brontë's novel, which, though "regarded as the archetypal Yorkshire novel ... owed as much, if not more, to Walter Scott's Border country". Rob Roy is set "in the wilds of Northumberland, among the uncouth and quarrelsome squirearchical Osbaldistones", while Cathy Earnshaw "has strong similarities with Diana Vernon, who is equally out of place among her boorish relations" (Barker p. 501).

In Anne Brontë's The Tenant of Wildfell Hall (1848) the narrator, Gilbert Markham, brings an elegantly bound copy of Marmion as a present to the independent "tenant of Wildfell Hall" (Helen Graham) whom he is courting, and is mortified when she insists on paying for it.

In George Eliot's Middlemarch (1871), Mr. Trumbull remarks to Mary Garth:

"You have an interesting work there, I see, Miss Garth," he observed, when Mary re-entered. "It is by the author of Waverley: that is Sir Walter Scott. I have bought one of his works myself—a very nice thing, a very superior publication, entitled Ivanhoe. You will not get any writer to beat him in a hurry, I think—he will not, in my opinion, be speedily surpassed. I have just been reading a portion at the commencement of Anne of Jeersteen [sic]. It commences well."

Thomas Hardy, in his 1888 essay, The Profitable Reading of Fiction, writes:

Tested by such considerations as these there are obviously many volumes of fiction remarkable, and even great, in their character-drawing, their feeling, their philosophy, which are quite second-rate in their structural quality as narratives. Their fewness is remarkable, and bears out the opinion expressed earlier in this essay, that the art of novel-writing is as yet in its tentative stage only.... The Bride of Lammermoor is an almost perfect specimen of form, which is the more remarkable in that Scott, as a rule, depends more upon episode, dialogue, and description, for exciting interest, than upon the well-knit interdependence of parts.

The many other British novelists whom Scott influenced included Edward Bulwer-Lytton, Charles Kingsley, and Robert Louis Stevenson. He also shaped children's writers like Charlotte Yonge and G. A. Henty.

Nathaniel Hawthorne, in a letter to his sister Elizabeth on 31 October 1820, writes:

I have bought the Lord of the Isles and intend either to send or bring it to you. I like it as well as any of Scott's other poems... I shall read The Abbot, by the author of Waverley, as soon as I can hire it. I have read all of Scott's novels except that, I wish I had not, that I might have the pleasure of reading them again.

Edgar Allan Poe, an admirer of Scott, was particularly captivated with The Bride of Lammermoor, calling it "that purest, and most enthralling of fictions", and "the master novel of Scott."

In a speech delivered at Salem, Massachusetts, on 6 January 1860, to raise money for the families of the executed abolitionist John Brown and his followers, Ralph Waldo Emerson calls Brown an example of true chivalry, which consists not in noble birth but in helping the weak and defenseless and declares that "Walter Scott would have delighted to draw his picture and trace his adventurous career."

Henry James, in his 1864 essay, Fiction and Sir Walter Scott, writes:

Scott was a born story-teller: we can give him no higher praise. Surveying his works, his character, his method, as a whole, we can liken him to nothing better than to a strong and kindly elder brother, who gathers his juvenile public about him at eventide, and pours out a stream of wondrous improvisation. Who cannot remember an experience like this? On no occasion are the delights of fiction so intense. Fiction? These are the triumphs of fact. In the richness of his invention and memory, in the infinitude of his knowledge, in his improvidence for the future, in the skill with which he answers, or rather parries, sudden questions, in his low-voiced pathos and his resounding merriment, he is identical with the ideal fireside chronicler. And thoroughly to enjoy him, we must again become as credulous as children at twilight.

In his 1870 memoir, Army Life in a Black Regiment, New England abolitionist Thomas Wentworth Higginson (later editor of Emily Dickinson), described how he wrote down and preserved Negro spirituals or "shouts" while serving as a colonel in the 1st South Carolina Colored Infantry Regiment, the first authorized Union Army regiment recruited from freedmen during the Civil War. He wrote that he was "a faithful student of the Scottish ballads, and had always envied Sir Walter the delight of tracing them out amid their own heather, and of writing them down piecemeal from the lips of aged crones."

According to Karl Marx's daughter Eleanor, Scott was "an author to whom Karl Marx again and again returned, whom he admired and knew as well as he did Balzac and Fielding."

Mark Twain, in his 1883 Life on the Mississippi, satirised the impact of Scott's writings, declaring with humorous hyperbole that Scott "had so large a hand in making Southern character, as it existed before the [American Civil] war" that he is "in great measure responsible for the war." He goes on to coin the term "Sir Walter Scott disease", describing a respect for aristocracy, a social acceptance of duels and vendettas, and a taste for fantasy and romanticism, which he blames for the Southern US's lack of advancement. Twain also targeted Scott in Adventures of Huckleberry Finn, where he names a sinking boat the "Walter Scott" (1884); and, in A Connecticut Yankee in King Arthur's Court (1889), the main character repeatedly utters "Great Scott!" as an oath; by the end of the book, however, he has become absorbed in the world of knights in armour, reflecting Twain's ambivalence on the topic.

In Anne of Green Gables (1908) by Lucy Maude Montgomery, as Anne is bringing in the cows from pasture:

The cows swung placidly down the lane, and Anne followed them dreamily, repeating aloud the battle canto from Marmion—which had also been part of their English course the preceding winter and which Miss Stacy had made them learn off by heart—and exulting in its rushing lines and the clash of spears in its imagery. When she came to the lines

The stubborn spearsmen still made good
Their dark impenetrable wood,

she stopped in ecstasy to shut her eyes that she might the better fancy herself one of that heroic ring.

The idyllic Cape Cod retreat of suffragists Verena Tarrant and Olive Chancellor in Henry James's The Bostonians (1886) is called Marmion, evoking what James considered the Quixotic idealism of such social reformers.

In To the Lighthouse by Virginia Woolf, Mrs. Ramsey glances at her husband:

He was reading something that moved him very much ... He was tossing the pages over. He was acting it – perhaps he was thinking himself the person in the book. She wondered what book it was. Oh, it was one of old Sir Walter's she saw, adjusting the shade of her lamp so that the light fell on her knitting. For Charles Tansley had been saying (she looked up as if she expected to hear the crash of books on the floor above) – had been saying that people don't read Scott any more. Then her husband thought, "That's what they'll say of me;" so he went and got one of those books? ... It fortified him. He clean forgot all the little rubs and digs of the evening... and his being so irritable with his wife and so touchy and minding when they passed his books over as if they didn't exist at all ...[Scott's] feeling for straight forward simple things, these fishermen, the poor old crazed creature in Mucklebackit's cottage [in The Antiquary] made him feel so vigorous, so relieved of something that he felt roused and triumphant and could not choke back his tears. Raising the book a little to hide his face he let them fall and shook his head from side to side and forgot himself completely (but not one or two reflections about morality and French novels and English novels and Scott's hands being tied but his view perhaps being as true as the other view), forgot his own bothers and failures completely in poor Steenie's drowning and Mucklebackit's sorrow (that was Scott at his best) and the astonishing delight and feeling of vigor that it gave him. Well, let them improve upon that, he thought as he finished the chapter ... The whole of life did not consist in going to bed with a woman, he thought, returning to Scott and Balzac, to the English novel and the French novel.

Woolf, in a letter to Hugh Walpole on 12 September 1932, writes:

I don't know him [Scott] accurately and minutely as you do, but only in a warm, scattered, amorous way. Now you have put an edge on my love, and if it weren't that I must read MSS—how they flock! I should plunge—you urge me almost beyond endurance to plunge once more—yes, I say to myself, I shall read The Monastery again and then I shall go back to [The Heart of] Midlothian. I cant read the Bride [of Lammermoor], because I know it almost by heart: also the Antiquary (I think those two, as a whole, are my favourites). Well—to inspire a harassed hack to this wish to kick up her heels—what greater proof could there be of your powers of persuasion and illumination? My only complaint is that you pay too much attention to the arid gulls who can't open their beaks wide enough to swallow Sir Walter. One of the things I want to write about one day is the Shakespearean talk in Scott: the dialogues: surely that is the last appearance in England of the blank verse of Falstaff and so on! We have lost the art of the poetic speech.

John Cowper Powys described Walter Scott's romances as "by far the most powerful literary influence of my life". This can be seen particularly in his two historical novels, Porius: A Romance of the Dark Ages, set during the end of Roman rule in Britain, and Owen Glendower.

In 1951 the science-fiction author Isaac Asimov wrote "Breeds There a Man...?", a short story with a title alluding vividly to Scott's The Lay of the Last Minstrel (1805). In Harper Lee's To Kill a Mockingbird (1960), the protagonist's brother is made to read Scott's book Ivanhoe to the ailing Mrs. Henry Lafayette Dubose. In Mother Night (1961) by Kurt Vonnegut Jr, the memoirist and playwright Howard W. Campbell Jr. prefaces his text with the six lines beginning "Breathes there the man..." In Knights of the Sea (2010) by the Canadian author Paul Marlowe, there are several references to Marmion, as well as an inn named after Ivanhoe, and a fictitious Scott novel entitled The Beastmen of Glen Glammoch.

Scott also features as a character in two of Sara Sheridan's novels The Fair Botanists (2021) and The Jewel Keepers (2026)

=== The other arts ===
Although Scott's own appreciation of music was basic, to say the least, he had a considerable influence on composers. Some 90 operas based to some extent on his poems and novels have been traced, the most celebrated being Rossini's La donna del lago (1819, based on The Lady of the Lake) and Donizetti's Lucia di Lammermoor (1835, based on The Bride of Lammermoor). Others include Donizetti's 1829 opera Il castello di Kenilworth based on Kenilworth, Georges Bizet's La jolie fille de Perth (1867, based on The Fair Maid of Perth), and Arthur Sullivan's Ivanhoe (1891).

Many of Scott's songs were set to music by composers throughout the 19th century. Seven from The Lady of the Lake were set in German translations by Franz Schubert, one of them being 'Ellens dritter Gesang' popularly known as 'Schubert's Ave Maria'. Three lyrics, also in translation, appear from Ludwig van Beethoven in his Twenty-Five Scottish Songs, Op. 108. Other notable musical responses include three overtures: Waverley (1828) and Rob Roy (1831) by Hector Berlioz, and The Land of the Mountain and the Flood (1887, alluding to The Lay of the Last Minstrel) by Hamish MacCunn. "Hail to the Chief" from "The Lady of the Lake" was set to music around 1812 by the songwriter James Sanderson (c. 1769 – c. 1841). See the Wikipedia article "Hail to the Chief."

The Waverley Novels are full of eminently paintable scenes and many 19th-century artists responded to them. Among the outstanding paintings of Scott subjects are: Richard Parkes Bonington's Amy Robsart and the Earl of Leicester (c. 1827) from Kenilworth in the Ashmolean Museum, Oxford; Eugène Delacroix's L'Enlèvement de Rebecca (1846) from Ivanhoe in the Metropolitan Museum of Art, New York; and John Everett Millais's The Bride of Lammermoor (1878) in Bristol Museum and Art Gallery.

Walter Scott features as a character in Sara Sheridan's novel The Fair Botanists (2021).

== Works ==
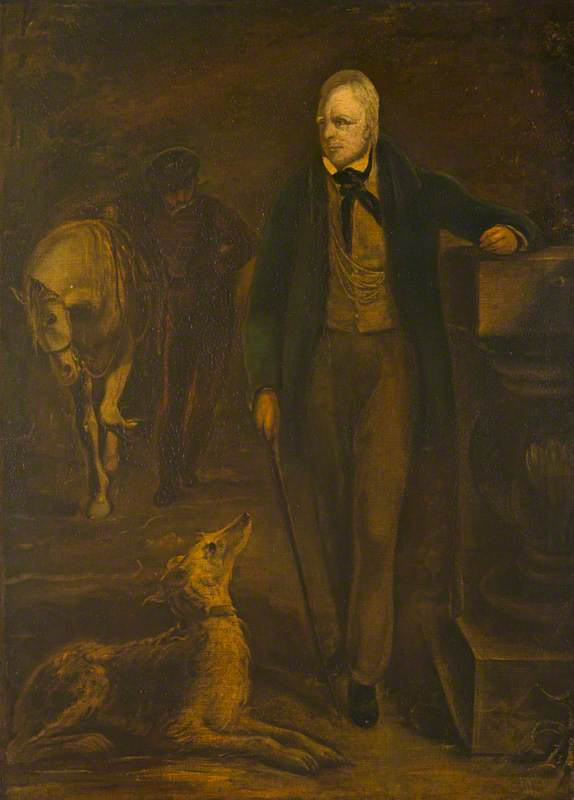
Portrait by James Howe

=== Novels ===
The Waverley novels is the title given to the long series of Scott novels released from 1814 to 1832, which takes its name from the first novel, Waverley. The following is a chronological list of the entire series:

- 1814: Waverley
- 1815: Guy Mannering
- 1816: Paul's Letters to his Kinsfolk
- 1816: The Antiquary
- 1816: The Black Dwarf and Old Mortality or The Tale of Old Mortality – the 1st instalment from the subset series, Tales of My Landlord
- 1817: Rob Roy
- 1818: The Heart of Mid-Lothian – the 2nd instalment from the subset series, Tales of My Landlord
- 1819: The Bride of Lammermoor and A Legend of Montrose or A Legend of the Wars of Montrose – the 3rd instalment from the subset series, Tales of My Landlord
- 1819 (dated 1820): Ivanhoe
- 1820: The Monastery
- 1820: The Abbot
- 1821: Kenilworth
- 1822: The Pirate
- 1822: The Fortunes of Nigel
- 1822: Peveril of the Peak
- 1823: Quentin Durward
- 1824: St. Ronan's Well or Saint Ronan's Well
- 1824: Redgauntlet
- 1825: The Betrothed and The Talisman – a subset series, Tales of the Crusaders
- 1826: Woodstock
- 1827: Chronicles of the Canongate — containing two short stories ("The Highland Widow" and "The Two Drovers") and a novel (The Surgeon's Daughter)
- 1828: The Fair Maid of Perth – the 2nd instalment from the subset series, Chronicles of the Canongate
- 1829: Anne of Geierstein
- 1832: Count Robert of Paris and Castle Dangerous – the 4th instalment from the subset series, Tales of My Landlord

Other novels:

- 1831–1832: The Siege of Malta – a finished novel published posthumously in 2008
- 1832: Bizarro – an unfinished novel (or novella) published posthumously in 2008

=== Short stories ===
- 1811: "The Inferno of Altisidora"
- 1817: "Christopher Corduroy"
- 1818: "Alarming Increase of Depravity Among Animals"
- 1818: "Phantasmagoria"
- 1827: "The Highland Widow" and "The Two Drovers" (see Chronicles of the Canongate above)
- 1828: "My Aunt Margaret's Mirror", "The Tapestried Chamber", and "Death of the Laird's Jock" – from the series The Keepsake Stories
- 1832: "A Highland Anecdote"

=== Poetry ===
Many of the short poems or songs released by Scott (or later anthologised) were originally not separate pieces but parts of longer poems interspersed throughout his novels, tales, and dramas.

- 1796: The Chase, and William and Helen: Two Ballads, translated from the German of Gottfried Augustus Bürger
- 1800: Glenfinlas
- 1802–1803: Minstrelsy of the Scottish Border
- 1805: The Lay of the Last Minstrel
- 1806: Ballads and Lyrical Pieces
- 1808: Marmion: A Tale of Flodden Field
- 1810: The Lady of the Lake
- 1811: The Vision of Don Roderick
- 1813: The Bridal of Triermain
- 1813: Rokeby
- 1815: The Field of Waterloo
- 1815: The Lord of the Isles
- 1817: Harold the Dauntless
- 1825: Bonnie Dundee

=== Plays ===
- 1799: Goetz of Berlichingen, with the Iron Hand: A Tragedy – an English-language translation of the 1773 German-language play by Johann Wolfgang von Goethe entitled Götz von Berlichingen
- 1822: Halidon Hill
- 1823: MacDuff's Cross
- 1830: The Doom of Devorgoil
- 1830: Auchindrane

=== Non-fiction ===
- 1814–1817: The Border Antiquities of England and Scotland – a work co-authored by Luke Clennell and John Greig with Scott's contribution consisting of the substantial introductory essay, originally published in 2 volumes from 1814 to 1817
- 1815–1824: Essays on Chivalry, Romance, and Drama – a supplement to the 1815–1824 editions of the Encyclopædia Britannica
- 1819–1826: Provincial Antiquities of Scotland
- 1821–1824: Lives of the Novelists
- 1825–1832: The Journal of Sir Walter Scott — first published in 1890
- 1826: The Letters of Malachi Malagrowther
- 1827: The Life of Napoleon Buonaparte, Emperor of the French. With a Preliminary View of the French Revolution. Published in 9 volumes.
- 1828: Religious Discourses. By a Layman
- 1828: Tales of a Grandfather; Being Stories Taken from Scottish History – the 1st instalment from the series, Tales of a Grandfather
- 1829: The History of Scotland: Volume I
- 1829: Tales of a Grandfather; Being Stories Taken from Scottish History – the 2nd instalment from the series, Tales of a Grandfather
- 1830: The History of Scotland: Volume II
- 1830: Tales of a Grandfather; Being Stories Taken from Scottish History – the 3rd instalment from the series, Tales of a Grandfather
- 1830: Letters on Demonology and Witchcraft
- 1831: Tales of a Grandfather; Being Stories Taken from the History of France – the 4th instalment from the series, Tales of a Grandfather
- 1831: Tales of a Grandfather: The History of France (Second Series) — unfinished; published 1996

== Collections ==
In 1925 Scott's manuscripts, letters and papers were donated to the National Library of Scotland by the Advocates Library of the Faculty of Advocates.

University College London holds about 300 books relating to Scott. The collection originated with a donation from Arthur MacNalty.

== See also ==
- Jedediah Cleishbotham (fictional editor of Tales of My Landlord, and Scott's alter ego)
- G. A. Henty
- Karl May
- Baroness Orczy
- Rafael Sabatini
- Emilio Salgari
- People on Scottish banknotes
- Samuel Shellabarger
- Lawrence Schoonover
- Jules Verne
- Frank Yerby
- GWR Waverley Class steam locomotives
- "Famous Scots Series"
- Principal Clerk of Session and Justiciary
- Scott Monument
- Writers' Museum
- Moral Emblems

== Cited sources ==
- Johnson, Edgar (1970). Sir Walter Scott: The Great Unknown. Vol. 1. London.
- Lockhart, John Gibson (1852). Memoirs of the Life of Sir Walter Scott, Bart. A. and C. Black.
- Sherwood, Mary Martha (1857), The life of Mrs Sherwood, Darton & Co., London

Baronetage of the United Kingdom
New creation	Baronet (of Abbotsford); 1820–1832	Next: Walter Scott
