= The Field of Waterloo =

1815 poem by Walter Scott

The Field of Waterloo is a poem by Walter Scott, written and published in 1815. It is in iambic tetrameters and trimeters with a few Spenserian stanzas at the end. The work moves from a depiction of the site of the battle, with farm life renewing in the autumn, to an account of the conflict, highlighting Napoleon and Wellington, and a roll-call of prominent British casualties.

== Background ==
While already interested, he became even more infatuated with the war after he received a letter from Charles Bell, according to his son-in-law and biographer John Gibson Lockhart. After the allied victory at the Battle of Waterloo on 18 June 1815; Scott visited the battlefield on 9 August, being one of the first British civilians to view it, before moving on to Paris. He hoped to recover his expenses by producing an account of his travels (in the form of imaginary letters), published as Paul's Letters to His Kinsfolk (1816), and The Field of Waterloo was also written during the trip. The profits from the poem were intended to go to a fund for widows and orphans of soldiers. Scott mixed personal observation with information received from his escorts, General Adam's aide-de-camp Campbell and Major Pryse Gordon and other officers, including the Duke of Wellington himself, whom he met in Paris. By then he had written an offshoot, Dance of Death, which he recited to John Scott, 13th of Gala in Paris; the work was featured in the 1813 Edinburgh Annual Register and published in Edinburgh on 11 January 1816. By his trip's conclusion, he wrote to his wife Charlotte, James Ballantyne, the 5th Duke of Buccleuch, and his friend Joanna Bailie.

The finished poem was sent to Ballantyne on 30 August. On his return to Abbotsford Scott was correcting proofs during the first week of October, responding to detailed criticisms by Ballantyne. Upon reaching London, he met with Lord Byron, who had yet to visit the battlefield and would later write Childe Harold's Pilgrimage, on 14 September. He also covers the battle in Paul's Letters to his Kinsfolk (1816), History of Europe, 1815 (1817), and Life of Napoleon Bonaparte (1827).

== Editions ==
The Field of Waterloo was published on 23 October 1815 in Edinburgh by Archibald Constable and Co. and on 2 November in London by Longman, Hurst, Rees, Orme, and Brown, and John Murray. It cost 5s (25p) and the print run was 6000. Two more editions followed in November of 1000 and 3000 copies respectively.

A critical edition is due to be included in Volume 5 of The Edinburgh Edition of Walter Scott's Poetry, published by Edinburgh University Press.

== Reception ==
Only 6 of the 17 reviews of Waterloo were favourable, as against 8 unfavourable and 3 neutral. There was anger at Scott's foisting on the public 'a crude, ill-organized abortion'. The British Critic was unusual in detecting moments of dignified beauty but recognised that it was difficult to combine poetry and patriotism in modern poetry, given Britain's tendency to generous reserve. The Critical Review judged it as 'absolutely the poorest, dullest, least interesting composition that has hitherto issued from the author of Rokeby. Even the gazette of the battle contains more information, and the style of the poem is very little, if at all, superior to that of Marshal Wellington's modest dispatches.' A 28 November 1817 poem published in the Chester Courant similarly described the work.

The poor reception of the poem led to widespread joking about Sir Walter Scott like Napoleon meeting his greatest defeat at Waterloo, as in the widely circulated squib attributed to Lord Erskine: 'On Waterloo's ensanguined plain / Lie tens of thousands of the slain; / But none, by sabre or by shot, / Fell half so flat as Walter Scott.' Critical commentary persisted for the next century.
