= Harold the Dauntless =

Narrative poem by Walter Scott

Harold the Dauntless is a narrative poem in six short cantos by Walter Scott, published in 1817. It employs a variety of metres.

Set in the Durham area, the poem tells of Harold's rejection of his father Witikind's acceptance of Christianity in return for church lands; of his disinheritance by the Church on his father's death and the loss of his intended bride; of his rescue by his father's spirit from pagan powers in an enchanted castle; and of his conversion and marriage to a Danish maiden who had long followed him disguised as a page.

== Background ==
According to J. G. Lockhart Scott began Harold the Dauntless soon after completing The Bridal of Triermain, that is early in 1813, keeping it before him 'as a congenial plaything, to be taken up whenever the coach brought no proof-sheets to jog him as to serious matters'. Its progress was remarkably erratic. In October 1815 Scott sent Canto 2 to James Ballantyne; on the 21st he is 'while the humour hits going on with Harold the Dauntless'; on 2 November the first canto at least has been, or is in the course of being, printed; and on 22 December Scott says it is nearly finished. But by 16 May 1816 it is still 'in the state of the Bear and Fiddle' (i. e. in the middle) and he is planning to resume it shortly. It is not till 14 November 1816 that another claim that it is nearly complete corresponded with reality: on the 22nd Scott informs Morritt that he is finishing it. Sending a copy hot from the press on 31 January 1817 he explains to Lady Louisa Stuart: 'I once thought I should have made it something clever, but it turned vapid upon my imagination; and I finished it at last with hurry and impatience'.

== Editions ==
Harold the Dauntless was published as 'by the author of The Bridal of Triermain ' on 30 January 1817 in Edinburgh by Archibald Constable, and in London by Longman, Hurst, Rees, Orme, and Brown. The price was 7s 6d (37.5p). It was not reprinted.

A critical edition is due to appear in Volume 5 of The Edinburgh Edition of Walter Scott's Poetry published by Edinburgh University Press.

== Canto summary ==
Introduction: The poet finds a remedy for ennui in romantic and legendary narrative.

Canto 1: When the pagan Count Witikind converts to Christianity in return for Durham church lands his son Harold leaves home in disgust, followed by a page, Gunnar. After some years Witikind dies and the Church resumes the lands, disinheriting Harold.

Canto 2: Harold demands the hand of Metelill, daughter of outlaw Wulfstane and witch Jutta who have in mind as son-in-law a rich local lord, William. In a remote dell Jutta invokes the god Zernebock who advises her to foment strife between Harold and the Church.

Canto 3: Gunnar expresses in song his unease about Metelill's parents, but Harold rejects his fears, planning to assert his right to his inheritance to render him a fit bridegroom.

Canto 4: In Durham Cathedral Harold shows the clergy gory proof that he has killed the two barons to whom the Church distributed his inheritance. The clergy demand that he give proof of his valour by sleeping in the enchanted Castle of the Seven Shields to win a treasure hoard.

Canto 5: On the way to the castle Harold hears the voice of a mysterious palmer figure warning him to copy his father's repentance when he is next tempted to violence. He attacks Metelill's bridal procession, slaying Wulfstane, but at Gunnar's behest he refrains from killing William.

Canto 6: Harold and Gunnar sleep at the castle. In the morning Harold tells the page that he has been rescued from three horsemen owing allegiance to Zernebock by the palmer figure, who is Witikind doomed to wander on the earth until his son turns to grace. Gunnar, revealed to be a Danish maiden Eivir in disguise, is claimed by Odin. Harold defeats the god and rescues Eivir. He is christened on the morning of their marriage.

== Reception ==
Four of the nine reviews of Harold were favourable, three neutral, and two disapproving. Comparisons with The Bridal of Triermain and with Scott's acknowledged poems reached a variety of conclusions, with Blackwood's Edinburgh Magazine occupying the middle ground: 'The poetry is more equal, and has more of nature and human character; yet when duly perused and reflected on, it scarcely leaves on the mind, perhaps, so distinct and powerful an impression'.
