= Chronicles of the Canongate =

Collection of stories by Sir Walter Scott

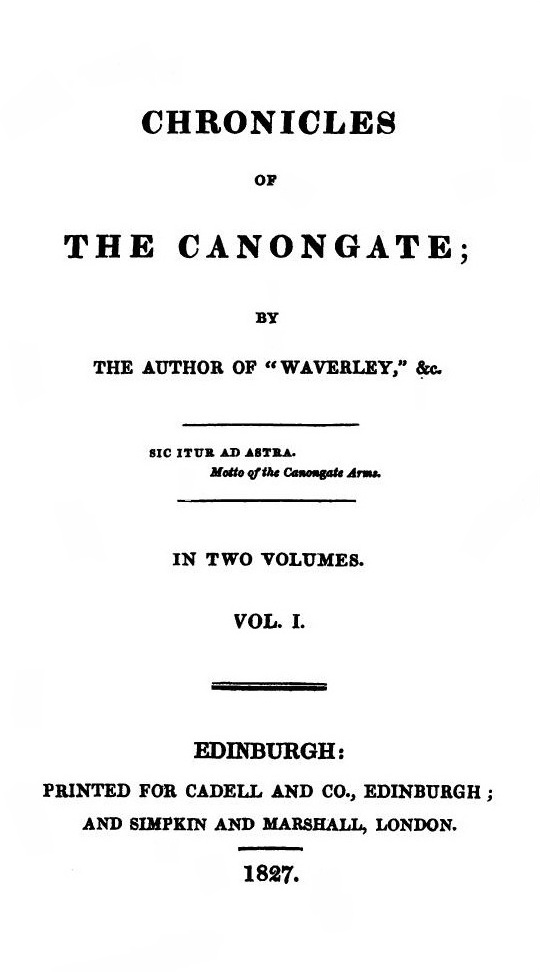
- First edition tile page
- Author: Sir Walter Scott
- Language: English
- Series: Chronicles of the Canongate; Waverley Novels
- Genre: Historical novel
- Publisher: Cadell and Co. (Edinburgh); Simpkin and Marshall (London)
- Publication date: 1827
- Publication place: Scotland
- Media type: print
- Pages: 288 (Edinburgh Edition, 2000)
- Preceded by: Woodstock
- Followed by: The Fair Maid of Perth

Chronicles of the Canongate is a collection of stories by Sir Walter Scott, published in 1827 and 1828. It is the 23rd book in the Waverley novels series and is named after the Canongate, in Edinburgh.

- 1st series (1827):
  - 'Chrystal Croftangry's Narrative'
  - 'The Highland Widow'
  - 'The Two Drovers'
  - The Surgeon's Daughter
- 2nd series (1828):
  - St Valentine's Day, or, The Fair Maid of Perth

== Composition ==
After his financial ruin at the beginning of 1826, Scott committed himself to writing works that would produce funds for the Trustees of James Ballantyne & Co., including the massive Life of Napoleon. However, he retained the right to produce less substantial works for his own benefit, and the first result was the collection of shorter fiction known as Chronicles of the Canongate. This was in two volumes, rather than the three occupied by most of the Waverley Novels, and its disparate nature meant that it would not interfere with his official writing project. The first mention of the two-volume publication actually envisages it being totally occupied by the tale which was to be entitled The Surgeon's Daughter: in his diary for 12 May 1826 Robert Cadell records a proposal from Scott to write 'a small Eastern Tale', which he agreed to publish as part of his strategy to set up as an independent publisher after the crash which had ruined Archibald Constable, Ballantyne, Scott, and himself. In the event The Surgeon's Daughter was to share the two volumes of the first series of Chronicles of the Canongate with 'Chrystal Croftangry's Narrative' and two short stories, 'The Highland Widow' and 'The Two Drovers'. The 'Narrative' and more than half of 'The Highland Widow' were composed between May and July 1826, but for almost a year Scott then devoted his full energies to the Life of Napoleon which he finished on 7 June 1827. He apparently resumed 'The Highland Widow' on the 20th and finished it before the end of the month, as well as writing an Introduction in his own name (he had officially acknowledged his authorship of the Waverley novels on 23 February). 'The Two Drovers' was probably composed in the first half of July, completing the first volume, but while he was waiting at the end of June to find out how long that story needed to be, he had already begun The Surgeon's Daughter, the sole occupant of the second volume, resuming it on 27 July and completing it on 16 September.

== Editions ==
The first series of Chronicles of the Canongate was published in Edinburgh by Cadell and Co. on 30 October 1827 and in London by Simpkin and Marshall on 5 November. The print run was 8750 and the price one guinea (£1 1s or £1.05). Scott revisited the collection in August and early September 1831, providing it with brief introductory material and notes and introducing a few textual changes. The 'Narrative' and the two short stories appeared posthumously in October 1832 in Volume 41, supplemented with three additional stories which had appeared in 1828 in the 1829 number of the annual The Keepsake. The Surgeon's Daughter was deferred to the final Volume 48 in April 1833 where it appeared along with the conclusion of Castle Dangerous.

The standard modern edition of the first series of Chronicles of the Canongate, by Claire Lamont, was published as Volume 20 of the Edinburgh Edition of the Waverley Novels in 2000: this is based on the first edition with emendations mainly from the manuscript; the 'Magnum' material appeared in Volume 25b (2012).

== Chrystal Croftangry's Narrative ==
=== Chapter summary ===
Ch.1: Forced to live in the debtors' sanctuary in the Canongate, Croftangry is restored to freedom with the help of a legal friend. Returning from abroad some years later he finds his friend senile and turns to family research.

Ch. 2: A manuscript history of the family leads Croftangry to pine for his lost country estate, and his lawyer Fairscribe discovers that it is for sale.

Ch. 3: Croftangry finds the Glentanner estate ruined by modern development and resolves to stay at the Treddles Arms, run by Christie Steele, his later mother's servant.

Ch. 4: Croftangry doesn't identify himself to Christie, and hears no good of himself. Returning to Edinburgh, he buys the lease of the inn for her and abandons the idea of a country life.

Ch. 5: Croftangry returns to the Canongate and turns to fiction, with the help of Mrs Bethune Baliol and his old landlady, Janet MacEvoy, now his housekeeper.

Ch. 6: Croftangry describes Mrs Baliol and gives an account of her agreement to provide him with material.

== The Highland Widow ==
=== Sources ===
Scott heard the story told by Anne Murray Keith (1736–1818), a friend of his maternal aunt, but he was also influenced by a similar tale in Caledonian Sketches (1809) by Sir John Carr (1772–1832). For details of military discipline he drew on Sketches of the Character, Manners, and Present State of the Highlanders of Scotland with details of the Military Service of the Highland Regiments (1822) by David Stewart of Garth.

=== Plot summary ===
The MacTavish family lived near Oban in 1775. Hamish MacTavish Mohr ("Senior"), a daring freebooter, had met his death in an encounter with the Saxon red-coats, by whom the Highlands were garrisoned after the battle of Culloden. His wife, who had shared all his dangers, strove to inspire their only son with his father's love of adventure and hatred of servile toil; but as he grew up the lad evinced no inclination for lawless pursuits, and, unable to endure his mother's taunts at his want of spirit, enlisted in one of the regiments formed in Scotland to oppose the French in the American War of Independence. Before sailing he sent her some money by Phadraick, and returned to spend a few days with her, when she fiercely reproached him for daring to act in opposition to her will, and, failing to alter his purpose, drugged his parting-cup, thus causing him to exceed his furlough, and render himself liable to the lash as a deserter. She then urged him to flee to her kinsmen, while she baffled his pursuers; but he resolved to await the arrival of the sergeant and men of his regiment who, he felt sure, would be sent to arrest him. They came and summoned him to surrender, but because they could not assure him against the lash, and provoked by his mother, he shot the sergeant dead. The other soldiers secured him, and he was marched as a prisoner to Dumbarton castle, where he was tried by court-martial and condemned to be shot. His captain and a Presbyterian minister interceded for him; but the English general in command was determined to make an example, and the next morning his sentence was carried out in the presence of his comrades.

His mother, who had attempted to follow him, was met by the minister wandering in a wild glen, and on hearing her son's fate, she uttered terrible imprecations, and renounced all further intercourse with the world. She lived, however, for many years in her lonely cottage, regarded with awe and pity by her neighbours as the victim of destiny, rather than the voluntary cause of her son's death and her own wretchedness. At length, while two women, who had been set to watch her last moments, were sleeping, she disappeared from her bed, and was never heard of again.

=== Characters ===
- Hamish MacTavish Mohr, an outlaw
- Elspat, his wife
- Hamish Bean ("Junior"), their son
- Miles Phadraick, a farmer
- Rev Michael Tyrie, a Presbyterian minister
- Green Colin, captain of Hamish Bean's regiment
- Allan Break Cameron, his sergeant

== The Two Drovers ==
=== Sources ===
Scott heard the story from George Constable (1719–1803), an Edinburgh lawyer and a friend of his father.

=== Plot summary ===
In 1795, Robin Oig was just starting from Doune with a drove of cattle for England, when his father's sister, who was supposed to be gifted with second sight, drew his dirk from the folds of his plaid, and, exclaiming that there was Saxon blood on it, induced him to entrust the weapon to Morrison, who undertook to return it when asked for. At Falkirk the Highlander met his bosom friend, Wakefield, and they travelled southwards together. Having reached Cumberland, they separated to hire pasturage for their beasts, and it happened that while the Englishman bargained with the bailiff, the Highlander came to terms with the squire, and they thus both secured the same enclosure. On discovering this, Wakefield reproached his comrade with having played him false, and, angrily refusing his offer that they should share the field, had to be content with a barren moor belonging to the landlord of the alehouse, where they had agreed to pass the night.

The squire had invited Oig to sup with him, and mentioned having passed Morrison a few miles off. On reaching the inn the Highlander met with a cold reception from the assembled company, who sided with Wakefield, and egged him on to challenge Oig to a Cumberland tussle. But the Highlander would have shaken hands, and, refusing to fight except with swords, he attempted to leave the room. Wakefield, however, opposed his doing so, and struck him senseless to the ground. Frantic with rage when he revived, and prevented by the hostess from attacking his comrade, Oig sullenly went out, warning him to beware. Striding over the moonlit moor to meet Morrison, he obtained his dirk on the pretence that he had enlisted, and, returning to the alehouse, he stabbed Wakefield through the heart.

At his trial the judge made every allowance for the provocation Oig had received, but pointed out to the jury that, as he went to recover possession of his weapon, there was ample time for his passion to have subsided, and for him to have reflected on the guilt of his meditated revenge. He was, accordingly, convicted of murder, and having been sentenced to be hanged, he met his fate with the observation, "I give a life for the life I took, and what can I do more?"

=== Characters ===
- Robin Oig MacCombich, a Highland drover
- Janet of Tomahourich, his aunt
- Hugh Morrison of Glanae, a Lowland drover
- Harry Wakefield, an English drover
- Mr Ireby, a Cumberland squire
- John Fleecebumpkin, his bailiff
- Ralph Heskett, host of an alehouse
- Dame Heskett, his wife
- Hortence Bennet, his lover

== The Surgeon's Daughter ==
=== Sources ===
The main story of The Surgeon's Daughter was transmitted to Scott by a regular informant, a Galloway excise officer Joseph Train. For details of life in India, Scott owned three useful publications: A History of the Military Transactions of the British Nation in Indostan (1775‒78) by Robert Orme; Narrative Sketches of the Conquest of Mysore (the second edition, published in 1800); and Captivity, Sufferings, and Escape of James Scurry, who was detained a prisoner during ten years, in the dominions of Hyder Ali and Tippoo Saib (1824). While he was composing the novel, Scott realised that he needed more information about India than these books provided, so he enlisted the help of James Ferguson (1778‒1859), who had served with the East India Company, and who furnished him with a set of sketches of Indian life and manners that proved very helpful: they are sometimes quoted almost verbatim.

=== Plot summary ===
Gideon Grey was a surgeon who lived in Fife in the late 18th century. The surgeon's services were unexpectedly sought by a pregnant woman and her husband, who arrived in the village, as strangers, just before she gave birth. The following day the father left, and within a month the mother was carried off by her father, who persuaded Mr Grey to undertake the care and education of the boy, and deposited a thousand pounds in trust for him. Four years afterwards Mrs Grey died in giving birth to a daughter, and the two children were brought up together. At the age of fourteen Richard, who had been led by his nurse to believe himself born to wealth and honour, was informed by his guardian of his real position, and, after consulting with Mr Lawford and his companion Tom Hillary, he decided to remain an inmate of Mr Grey's family as his apprentice, with Hartley as a fellow pupil. As they grew up both the young men fell in love with Menie, and when the doctor proposed that Hartley should become his partner, and endeavour to secure her affections, it transpired that she and Richard were already secretly engaged. Hartley determined to make a voyage to India, and learnt with astonishment that his rival, at the instigation of Hillary, who was now a captain in the Company's service, intended to spend two years there before marrying, in the hope of realising a fortune.

Having obtained the money left by his grandfather in Mr Grey's hands, and enlisted as a recruit, he sailed from Edinburgh with his friend for the depot at Ryde; but, on recovering from a drinking bout before landing, he found himself in the military hospital, deserted by Tom Hillary, and robbed of all his belongings. Hartley, however, was acting as one of the medical officers, and, having earned the gratitude of the commandant, General Witherington, by successfully treating two of his children who were suffering from smallpox, was able to obtain a commission for his fellow-student. The general and his wife had discovered that Richard was their first-born, and when he was introduced to them the shock of hearing him describe himself as an orphan, deserted by his parents, caused the death of his mother, upon which the father was seized with a fit of frenzy, and on recovering could not face his son again. Hartley had, however, been previously entrusted with his history, as well as a gift of money for him, and they sailed together for Madras. Having killed his colonel in a duel, Richard fled to the court of a native prince, while Hartley obtained great reputation as a medical practitioner. One of his patients was Barak el Hadji, who promised him his influence with Sultan Hyder Ali, should he at any time need it.

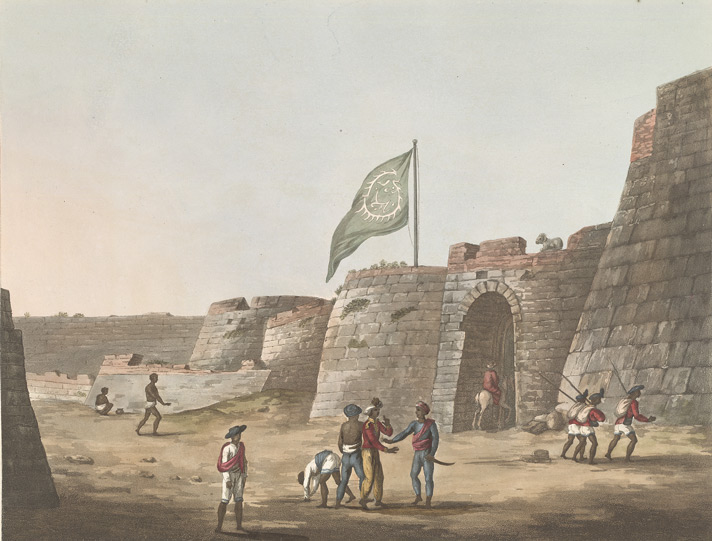
The flag of the Sultanate of Mysore at the entrance into the fort of Bangalore.

Some months afterwards he was startled by the presence of Menie Grey at a public breakfast, chaperoned by the Begum, who, he learnt, was the wealthy widow of a Rajah. At a private interview with his old master's daughter, Hartley elicited from her that she had come out at Richard's invitation to be married, and was on her way to meet him in Mysore. Mistrusting her lover, he offered his protection should she need it, and the next day he received a note from her telling him she was sold to Hyder Ali's son Tippoo Saib (Tipu Sultan). Unable to obtain an audience of the governor, Hartley resolved to solicit the intervention of Hyder Ali, and, having reached Seringapatam (Karnataka), he sought the aid of El Hadji, who introduced him to another Fakir of higher rank. Following his directions, he accompanied a troop of native cavalry to Tippoo's encampment near Bangalore, and witnessed his return thither, escorted by a magnificent bodyguard, including artillery and elephants. The Begum, who had previously arrived with her retinue, and Menie under her protection, was at once invited to an interview with the prince in his garden the following day. Accordingly, at noon the discharge of cannon announced that he had left his palace; and on the arrival of his visitor, attended by Richard as her principal officer, she was conducted to a cushion on his right hand. An attendant then proclaimed the appointment of Richard as governor of the city, and the Begum in return presented Tippoo with the litter containing Menie.

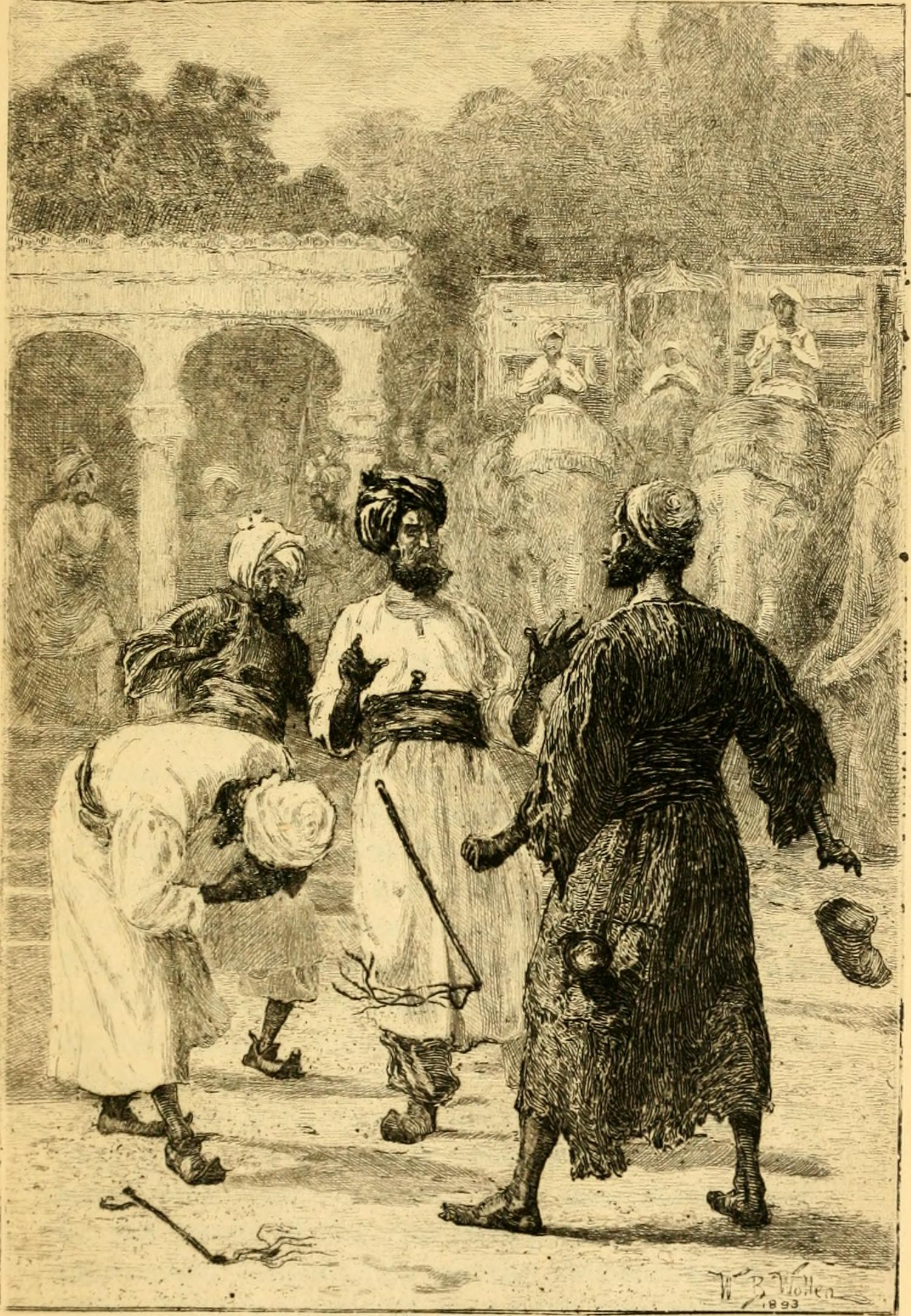
Hyder Ali as 'The Pretended Fakir'

The old Fakir, however, came forward, and, throwing off his disguise, ascended the throne as Hyder Ali. Having reproved his son, he commanded him to restore the gift to the care of Hartley, but allowed the ceremony of investiture to proceed. As Richard, however, who had plotted with Paupiah to betray his trust, was about to mount the elephant in waiting for him, the Rajah made a sign, upon which the animal seized him by the neck with its trunk, and crushed him to death with its foot. The Begum was then ordered to bear her share in compensating her intended victim for the indignity she had suffered, and afterwards deprived of her power and riches. Menie returned to her native village, and the gallant Hartley died from a distemper caught in the courageous pursuit of his profession.

=== Characters ===
Principal characters in bold

- Gideon Grey, of Middlemas, a village surgeon
- Jean Grey, his wife
- **Menie Grey**, their daughter
- **Richard Tresham**, afterwards General Witherington
- **Zilia de Monçada**, afterwards his wife
- **Richard Middlemas**, their son
- Mathias de Monçada, Zilia's father
- Mr Lawford, Town Clerk of Middlemas
- **Tom Hillary**, his apprentice
- **Adam Hartley**, Mr Grey's apprentice
- The Laird of Loupenheight
- Captain Seelencooper, Governor of Military Hospital at Ryde
- **Adela de Montreville**, a Begum
- Paupiah, steward to the British resident
- Hyder Ali, Rajah of Mysore
- Barak el Hadji his agent
- Tippoo Saib, his son

=== Chapter summary ===
The chapter numbering follows the Edinburgh Edition. In other editions the first and last chapters are treated as unnumbered preface and conclusion. The alternative chapter numbers are given in square brackets.

Ch. 1: Chrystal Croftangry, the fictitious author of Chronicles of the Canongate, sends the newly printed first volume (containing his narrative, 'The Highland Widow', and 'The Two Drovers') to his friend Mr Fairscribe, who reacts unfavourably and offers as a better subject the Indian story of Menie Grey, which his daughter Katie duly relates.

Ch. 2 [1]: Taken short at the village of Middlemas on the way to Edinburgh with her lover Richard Tresham, Zilia de Monçada gives birth to a son at the house of Gideon Grey, the local surgeon. Her father arrives with a legal messenger and removes her, Grey agreeing to bring up the boy [as Richard Middlemas].

Ch. 3 [2]: Four years later, Mrs Grey dies giving birth to Menie. When Richard enters his teens Grey tells him the circumstances of his birth. Initially upset, the lad chooses to be apprenticed to the surgeon.

Ch. 4 [3]: At the same period Grey takes Adam Hartley on as a second apprentice. Three or four years pass, and the two young men react differently to the attention paid to Menie at the Hunters' Ball by the Laird of Loupenheight.

Ch. 5 [4]: The next morning, Richard and Adam quarrel over Menie. Time passes, and Adam tells Richard that Grey has offered him a two-year probationary period leading to a partnership and Menie's hand. However, Menie has revealed her secret engagement to Richard, and Adam proposes to enter the Indian service to leave the way clear for the couple. But Richard is also attracted by the more profitable and interesting prospects offered by the service.

Ch. 6 [5]: Tom Hillary, formerly the town clerk's apprentice and now a captain in the Indian service, persuades Richard to enlist and accompany him on his return to the subcontinent.

Ch. 7 [6]: On the Isle of Wight, Richard is overpowered by drink (possibly drugged), and recovers consciousness in a military hospital, deprived of his possessions.

Ch. 8 [7]: Richard is tended by Adam, who arranges with General Witherington for his release and promotion. (Adam had helped two of the three children of General and Mrs Witherington [who are Richard's parents] recover from smallpox.)

Ch. 9 [8]: Richard meets his parents, and his mother expires of emotion before Witherington discloses their relationship.

Ch. 10 [9]: Adam tells the full story of Richard's parents, deriving from a conversation he had with Mrs Witherington, and gives him a letter from his late mother asking him to trust Hartley, whom she has provided with funds for his benefit. She has accepted his illegitimate status (rejected by Richard) in a document which Adam refuses to surrender notwithstanding the offer of a substantial bribe. On their arrival in India Adam and Richard maintain a cool relationship. Richard kills his commanding officer in a duel and flees from the British settlements.

Ch. 11 [10]: Three years pass. In his medical capacity Adam attends Barak el Hadgi, an agent of Hyder Ali, who promises to help him in time of need if he comes to Mysore. Several months later, Adam spots Menie in attendance on Adela de Montreville, a Begum [lady of high rank] favoured by Hyder, who numbers Richard (Adela's lover) among his officers.

Ch. 12 [11]: Menie tells Adam she is planning to join Richard.

Ch. 13 [12]: Adela and Richard (disguised as her slave) discuss his plan to introduce Menie to Tippoo Saib, and then to betray him to the British. She is determined that she herself will not be betrayed. Richard makes arrangements with the British Governor's steward Paupiah for his deception of Tippoo.

Ch. 14 [13]: Adam receives a despairing note from Menie. Refused access to the Governor, he travels to Seringapatam to appeal directly to Hyder, but finds he is out of town.

Ch. 15 [14]: Adam is conducted to Barak and a senior fakir who agrees to present his concerns to Hyder. Adam travels on to Bangalore where Tippoo makes arrangements for a formal meeting with the Begum at which he invests Richard with the command of the city in return for Menie. The senior fakir objects and, revealing himself as Hyder in disguise, directs Menie to be removed to safety and has Richard stamped to death by an elephant. Two years later, Adam is killed by an infection incurred in his professional duties, and Menie returns to Middlemas to spend the rest of her life, unmarried, in active benevolence.

Ch. 16: Croftangry tells how he read the manuscript of the story to a party at the Fairscribes.

== Reception ==
With rare dissentient voices, the reviewers rated the two volumes of Chronicles of the Canongate highly overall. The Croftangry chapters were judged delightful and moving, though perhaps a little extended. 'The Highland Widow' was the overall favourite of the three tales, showing a very affecting use of simple materials. There was a tendency to place 'The Two Drovers' on a lower level, with some objections to the vulgarity of the subject, but it too was often highly acclaimed. The Surgeon's Daughter was highly praised by half the reviewers as a powerful narrative, while the others gave it a lukewarm reception at best: the most common complaint was that the events, particularly in the second part set in India, were improbable, and that Scott was out of his element on the subcontinent.
