= The Talisman (Scott novel) =

1825 novel by Walter Scott

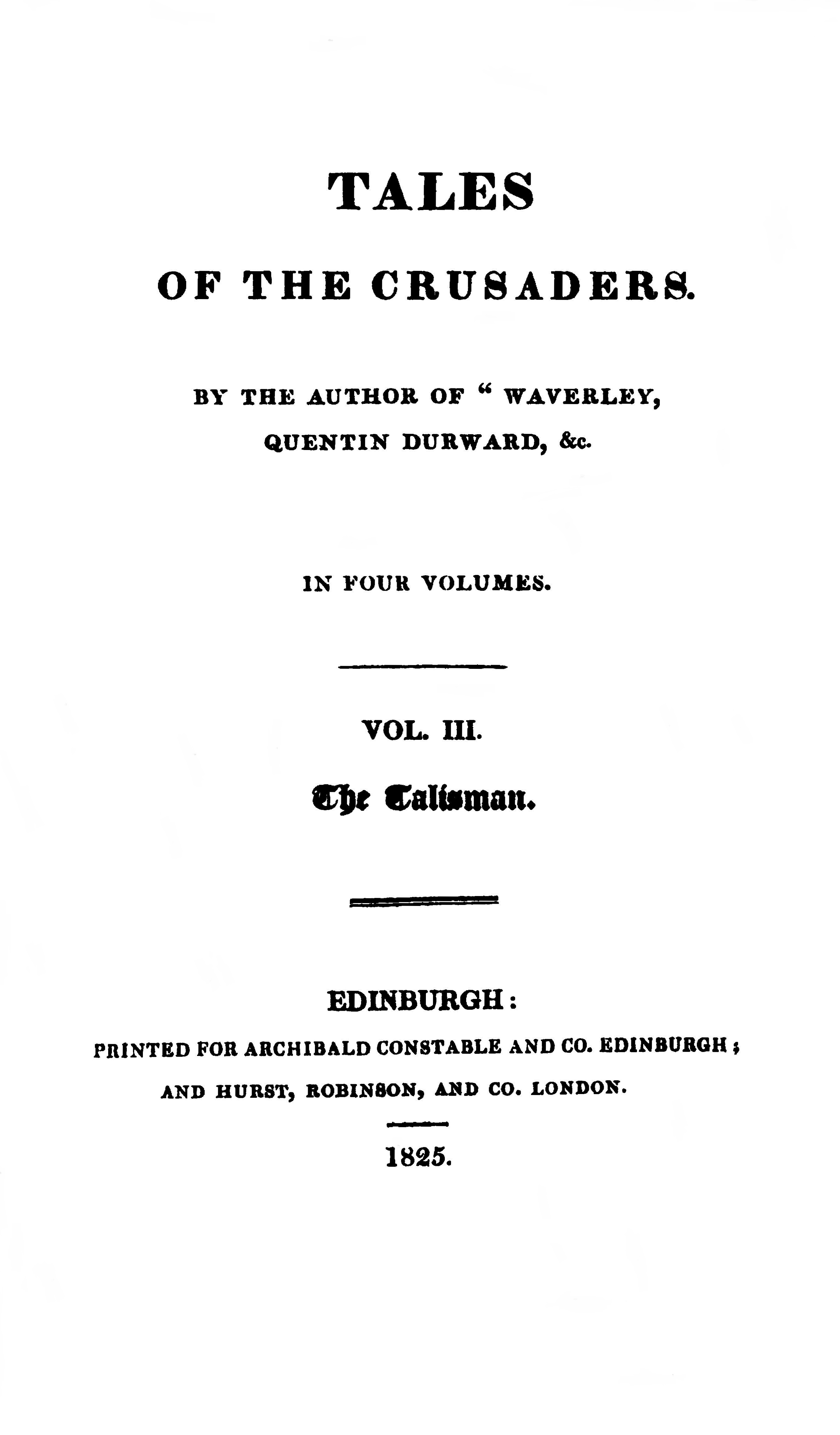
- First edition title page.
- Author: Sir Walter Scott
- Language: English
- Series: Tales of the Crusaders; Waverley Novels
- Genre: Historical novel
- Publisher: Archibald Constable and Co. (Edinburgh); Hurst, Robinson and Co. (London)
- Publication date: 1825
- Publication place: Scotland
- Media type: Print
- Pages: 278 (Edinburgh Edition, 2009)
- Preceded by: The Betrothed
- Followed by: Woodstock

The Talisman is one of the Waverley novels by Sir Walter Scott. Published in 1825 as the second of his Tales of the Crusaders, it is set during the Third Crusade and centres on the relationship between Richard I of England and Saladin.

== Composition and sources ==
At the beginning of April 1824, two months before he completed Redgauntlet, Scott envisaged that it would be followed by a four-volume publication containing two tales, at least one of which would be based on the Crusades. He began composition of the first story, The Betrothed, in June, but it made slow progress and came to a halt in the second volume at some point in the autumn after criticisms by James Ballantyne. Scott then changed course and began work on the companion novel The Talisman, and the first two chapters and part of the third were set in type by the end of the year. January 1825 was full of distractions, but a decision to resume The Betrothed was made in mid-February 1825 and it was essentially complete by mid-March. The way was then clear for the main composition of The Talisman which proceeded briskly. Its first volume was completed in April and its second at the very end of May or beginning of June.

Five clearly identifiable sources have been located for leading elements in The Talisman. The disguised Saladin's account of the origin of the Kurds is taken from the Bibliotheque orientale by Barthélemy d'Herbelot (1777‒79). The character of Leopold of Austria and his tearing down of Richard's standard was prompted by the Middle English romance Richard Coer de Lyon. The attempted assassination of Richard is recounted in The History of the Crusades by Charles Mills (1820). Saladin's beheading of Amaury comes from The History of the Knights of Malta by the Abbé de Vertot (1728). And the talisman itself is the Lee Penny used to cure people and animals up to Scott's time and preserved at the Lee near Lanark in the Scottish Borders. Scott's sceptical attitude to the Crusades, and his presentation of Richard and Saladin, follow three historians: David Hume, Edward Gibbon, and Mills.

Edward Said suggested that Scott's information on "Oriental" subjects for this novel "probably came from Byron and Beckford".

== Editions ==
The first edition of The Talisman was published as part of Tales of the Crusaders in Edinburgh by Archibald Constable and Co. on 22 June 1825. It was advertised for publication by Hurst, Robinson, and Co. in London on the same date, but apparently not issued until 11 July. The price was two guineas (£2 2s or £2.10). As with all of the Waverley novels until 1827 publication was anonymous. There is no conclusive evidence that Scott returned to the novel until the spring of 1831 when he revised the text and provided an introduction and notes for the 'Magnum' edition, in which it appeared as Volume 38 in July 1832.

The standard modern edition, by J. B. Ellis with J. H. Alexander, P. D. Garside, and David Hewitt, was published as Volume 18b of the Edinburgh Edition of the Waverley Novels in 2009: this is based on the first edition with emendations mainly from the manuscript; the 'Magnum' material appears in Volume 25b (2012).

== Plot summary ==
During a truce in the Third Crusade, Sir Kenneth and a Saracen Emir ride together towards the cave of the hermit Theodoric of Engaddi, where Theodoric gives Sir Kenneth some secret information. The Emir falls asleep and the other two men go to a chapel, where Sir Kenneth meets his old lover, Lady Edith.

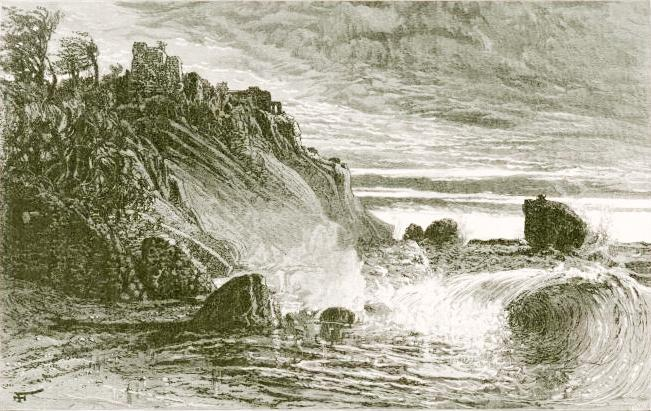
Ruins of Ascalon, 1880s

Sir Kenneth returns with a Muslim doctor to Ascalon, where Richard Coeur de Lion lies ill in his tent. Sir Kenneth and the King discuss Sir Kenneth's visit to the chapel. The Muslim doctor cures the King using medicine crafted from the doctor’s talisman, or magical stone. While King Richard sleeps, Conrade of Montserrat, who wishes to become King of Jerusalem, incites Archduke Leopold of Austria to plant his flag in the centre of the camp. The King wakes up and when he discovers what Leopold has done, he tears down the flag. Philip of France persuades him to refer the matter to the council, and Sir Kenneth is asked to watch the English flag until daybreak. Soon after midnight, Sir Kenneth is lured away under false pretences to visit Lady Edith. The flag is stolen and Sir Kenneth's dog is deliberately injured.

The camp doctor tells Sir Kenneth that Sultan Saladin wishes to marry Lady Edith. Sir Kenneth tries to warn the King, but the King does not believe him and banishes Sir Kenneth for failure to protect England’s banner. Kenneth is given as a slave to the Muslim doctor. In the desert, the Muslim doctor reveals himself to be the Emir. The Emir then arranges to give Kenneth as a gift to Richard, to help Kenneth obtain the matrimony of Edith. They disguise Kenneth as a Nubia slave. Sir Kenneth, still in disguise, saves the king from an assassination attempt. He promises King Richard he can discover who stole the flag.

At a procession of the Christian armies and their leaders, Sir Kenneth's dog attacks the Marquis Conrade, recognizing the Marquis as the man who injured him. The Marquis betrays his guilt by exclaiming, "I never touched the banner" and challenges the King to a duel. Since the King is not allowed to participate in a duel, he instructs the Nubian slave to ask Saladin for neutral ground and a person to be champion. Saladin hosts the court in the desert for the jousting tournament and reveals himself as both the Emir and the doctor. Kenneth sheds his disguise as the nubia slave and offers himself as the King’s champion.

Sir Kenneth wins the duel and it is then revealed that rather than being a lowly knight, he is actually the Earl of Huntingdon and Prince Royal of Scotland. Saladin slays the Grand Master Templar who assisted the Marquis in treason. Now that his higher rank is acknowledged, he becomes eligible to marry Lady Edith. King Richard acknowledges the futility of continuing the Crusade, given the lack of support from the other Christian armies, and the superiority of Saladin's forces, and so the Crusade is abandoned.

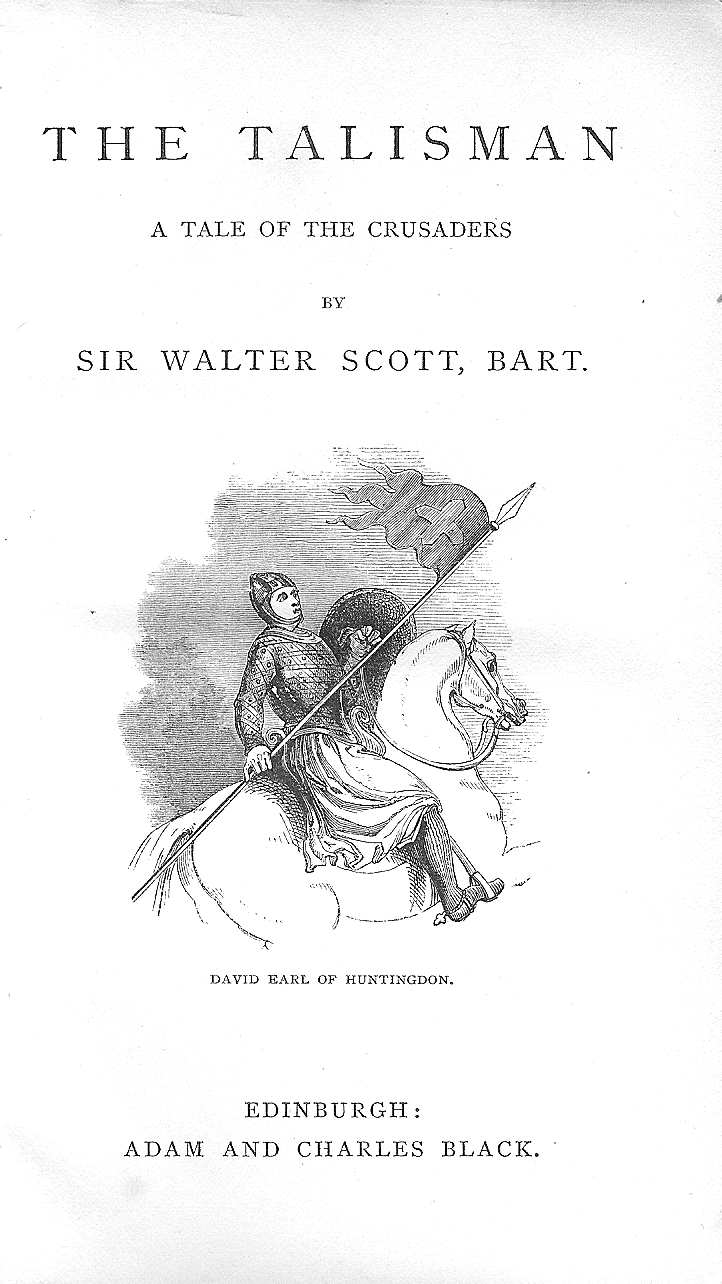
David Earl of Huntingdon, frontispiece to 1863 edition by A & C Black

== Characters ==
Principal characters in bold

- **Sir Kenneth**, afterwards the Earl of Huntingdon
- The Sultan **Saladin**, alias Sheerkohf or Ilderim (an Emir) and Adonbec el Hakim (a physician)
- Theodoric of Engaddi, a hermit
- **Richard I, King of England**
- **Lady Edith Plantagenet**, his kinswoman
- Blondel, his minstrel
- Queen Berengaria, his wife
- Lady Calista of Montgaillard, her attendant (of Montfaucon in some editions)
- Necbatanus and Guenevra, her dwarves
- Sir Thomas de Vaux of Gisland
- The Archbishop of Tyre
- Giles Amaury, Grand Master of the Templars
- Conrade, Marquis of Monserrat
- Leopold, Archduke of Austria
- Philip II, King of France
- Earl Wallenrode, a Hungarian warrior
- A marabout or dervise

== Chapter summary ==
Volume Three (of Tales of the Crusaders)

Ch.1: Kenneth and an Emir [Sheerkohf or Ilderim, Saladin incognito] clash by the Dead Sea and agree a personal truce.

Ch. 2: Kenneth and Sheerkohf are contrasted as they arrive at the oasis known as the Diamond of the Desert. They express their differing cultural views of women.

Ch. 3: As they continue to debate, Sheerkohf tells of his descent from the immortal Genii. They encounter the hermit Engaddi and are afforded shelter for the night in his cell.

Ch. 4: Entering a richly decorated chapel, Kenneth receives the clandestine acknowledgment of one of the choristers, his lady love Edith.

Ch. 5: After the service two dwarves, Nectanabus and Guenevra, enter the chapel: Engaddi dismisses them and departs with Kenneth.

Ch. 6: The fevered King Richard and Sir Thomas de Vaux discuss the inactivity of the other Crusaders and their inability to find an effective leader.

Ch. 7: Kenneth arrives and tries to persuade De Vaux (who is not well disposed to the Scots) that a Moorish physician sent by Saladin, Adouban el Hakim [Saladin again in disguise], should be admitted to Richard.

Ch. 8: Richard tells De Vaux that he will see El Hakim. De Vaux and the Archbishop of Tyre discuss the physician and receive a demonstration of his skill. The Archbishop is alarmed to learn that Kenneth has returned.

Ch. 9: Kenneth tells Richard that he sought Engaddi, at the behest of the Crusading council, to act as a vehicle for securing a lasting peace. Giles Amaury, Grand Master of the Templars, and Conrade of Montserrat urge Richard not to trust El Hakim, but he drinks the cup of water prepared by the physician by dipping a talisman in it.

Ch. 10: Amaury and Conrade consider that their ambitions will be best served by a Crusader withdrawal, to which Richard is opposed. Amaury suggests he be assassinated, but they agree that Conrade should first attempt to stir up dissent between Austria and England.

Ch. 11: Conrade arouses Leopold of Austria, who plants his banner alongside Richard's. Richard fells the Austrian flag and the Earl Wallenrode, and entrusts the care of his own standard to Kenneth.

Ch. 12: Nectanabus brings a ring as a token of summons from Edith and persuades Kenneth to leave the banner unattended.

Ch. 13: Kenneth overhears the royal ladies discussing him in their tent: it becomes clear that he has been enticed to leave the standard as a result of a wager by the Queen, and when he is revealed Edith urges him to return to his watch. He finds Richard's flag gone and his own dog Roswal injured.

Volume Four

Ch. 1 (14): El Hakim sets about tending Roswal and tells Kenneth that Tyre is to suggest to Richard a plan including the marriage of Saladin and Edith as part of a peace treaty.

Ch. 2 (15): Kenneth accepts the royal sentence of death for deserting the banner.

Ch. 3 (16): At Edith's urging, Queen Berengaria agrees to intercede with her husband for Kenneth's life.

Ch. 4 (17): Berengaria and Edith, supported by Engaddi, obtain a temporary stay of execution for Kenneth.

Ch. 5 (18): El Hakim obtains a pardon for Kenneth, who will become the physician's slave. Engaddi unveils an agreement which will deal with Leopold without involving violence and tells Richard his own sinful history.

Ch. 6 (19): Tyre presents the marriage plan to Richard, who is not unreceptive but decides to make one attempt to rally his allies. This is successful. Amaury proposes to Conrade that they employ a Charegite (belonging to a fanatical Islamic sect) to eliminate Richard.

Ch. 7 (20): The royal ladies decide to tell Richard the truth about Kenneth's desertion of the banner, and he pardons the Queen for her irresponsible behaviour. Edith complains to Richard about Kenneth's bondage. A mute Nubian slave, Zohauk [Kenneth in disguise], arrives with a letter from Saladin presenting him as a gift to Richard. He is followed by a dancing dervise [the Charegite].

Ch. 8 (21): Zohauk saves Richard from assassination by the dervise. He undertakes (in writing) to reveal the identity of the banner thief, and indicates that he has a message to deliver to Edith from Saladin.

Ch. 9 (22): [The narrative retrogrades to follow Ch. 18] El Hakim and his slave Kenneth out-gallop a party of Templars.

Ch. 10 (23): El Hakim reveals himself as the Emir of the opening chapters and arranges that Kenneth, disguised as Zohauk, will convey Saladin's message to Edith.

Ch. 11 (24): Roswal attacks Conrade, identifying him as the banner thief, and arrangements are made for a duel between him and a royal champion.

Ch. 12 (25): Richard, aware that Zohauk is Kenneth, hints that he may become his champion against Conrade and sends him, escorted by Sir Henry Neville, with Saladin's letter to Edith. Although she recognises him, he persists in his dumbness as agreed with Richard, and she spurns both him and the letter.

Ch. 13 (26): Blondel sings the lay of 'The Bloody Vest' at Richard's request, and Edith tells the King of her intention to reject Saladin's approach for her hand.

Ch. 14 (27): Richard and his followers arrive at the Diamond of the Desert where the duel is to take place. Saladin demonstrates his skill with a scimitar before revealing that he was El Hakim. De Vaux indicates to the King that Kenneth is ready to act as champion, and Edith that she has no particular interest in him.

Ch. 15 (28): Preparations are made for the combat, and Amaury tries to stiffen Conrade's resolve. Kenneth defeats him and Richard announces he has discovered the Scot to be the Earl of Huntingdon. Amaury kills Conrade to prevent him from revealing his own treachery, leading Saladin to kill him in turn. Saladin's sense of his responsibility as a ruler leads him to decline Richard's impetuous offer of a combat. Huntingdon and Edith marry, Saladin sending them the talisman as a gift.

== Reception ==
Only a handful of reviewers dissented from the overwhelmingly enthusiastic reception of The Talisman. It was generally ranked among the best of the Waverley novels, with admiration of its dazzling richness and high colouring. The plot was skilfully conducted, and the characters well discriminated and interesting, with Richard and Saladin outstandingly complex, and Edith and De Vaux both impressive. The small number of objectors tended to find the work extravagant and theatrical in a bad sense.

== Film and television ==
The 1954 Cinemascope film King Richard and the Crusaders was based on The Talisman. In 1980 BBC adapted the novel to a miniseries directed by Richard Bramall. The 2005 epic film Kingdom of Heaven, directed by Sir Ridley Scott and starring Orlando Bloom, Liam Neeson and Edward Norton, while set in an earlier period, took part of its plot from The Talisman.

== Legacy ==
In September 1956, British Railways named the 10 o'clock London King's Cross to Edinburgh Waverley non-stop express train The Talisman.
