= Edinburgh Edition of the Waverley Novels =

Editions of Walter Scott's Waverly Novels

The Edinburgh Edition of the Waverley Novels by Walter Scott appeared in thirty volumes between 1993 and 2012. Published by Edinburgh University Press, it was the first complete critical edition of the novels.

== History ==
On 22 June 1983 Archie Turnbull, the Secretary of Edinburgh University Press, announced that his Press Committee had authorised him to investigate the feasibility of undertaking a critical edition of the novels and related fiction of Walter Scott and to welcome expressions of interest.

On 17 February 1984 a group of scholars and other interested parties met at a conference organised by David Daiches, making the decision that (in principle) the new edition should be based on early editions rather than the revised texts in the final 'Magnum' edition of 1829–33, and that David Hewitt of the University of Aberdeen should be Editor-in-Chief. After three years' detailed research the early-text policy was confirmed at a further conference in January 1987, with David Nordloh of the University of Indiana again acting as special advisor.

The novels were published in batches between 1993 and 2009, with the final two volumes (25a and 25b) of Introductions and Notes from the Magnum Opus edition appearing in 2012.

== Editorial policy ==
Almost all earlier editions of the Waverley Novels had been based on the 'Magnum' text prepared by Scott at the end of his life, the only significant exception being Claire Lamont's 1981 edition of Waverley, which took the first edition text as its basis. The Edinburgh Edition followed Lamont in basing their texts on the first editions, citing a wish that readers should experience the novels more as they first appeared, and their recognition that many errors were introduced between first publication and the 'Magnum'. Until Scott's acknowledgment of his authorship of the Waverley Novels in 1827 his manuscripts were copied and the copy sent to the printer, to preserve his anonymity. He relied on intermediaries to convert his rudimentary punctuation into a form suitable for public consumption, but in the process mistakes were made: words were misread, passages were omitted, and the punctuation was sometimes misinterpreted. The Edinburgh Edition therefore emended the first-edition copy text extensively, mainly from the manuscripts, and from author's proofs where they survive. Emendations were not introduced from later editions up to the 'Magnum' except to correct clear persisting errors.

== List of Novels and Short Story Collections ==
Period	Volume Number	Title	First Published	Main setting	Editor	Year of Publication	Pages
1097	23a	Count Robert of Paris	1831	Constantinople and Scutari (now in Turkey)	J. H. Alexander	2006	365
1187–92	18a	The Betrothed	1825	Wales and Gloucester (England)	J. B. Ellis with J. H. Alexander and David Hewitt	2009	278
1191	18b	The Talisman	1825	The Holy Land	J. B. Ellis with J. H. Alexander, David Hewitt, and P. D. Garside	2009	278
1194	08	Ivanhoe	1819	Yorkshire, Nottinghamshire and Leicestershire (England)	Graham Tulloch	1998	401
1307	23b	Castle Dangerous	1831	Lanarkshire (Scotland)	J. H. Alexander	2006	190
1396-1406	21	St Valentine's Day or The Fair Maid of Perth	1828	Perthshire (Scotland)	A. D. Hook and Donald Mackenzie	1999	397
1468	15	Quentin Durward	1823	Tours and Péronne (France); Liège (Wallonia/Belgium)	J. H. Alexander and G. A. M. Wood	2001	401
1474-7	22	Anne of Geierstein or The Maiden of the Mist	1829	Switzerland and Eastern France	J. H. Alexander	2000	403
1547–57	09	The Monastery	1820	Scottish Borders	Penny Fielding	2000	354
1567-8	10	The Abbot	1820	Various in Scotland	Christopher Johnson	2008	375
1575	11	Kenilworth	1821	Berkshire and Warwickshire (England)	J. H. Alexander	1993	392
1616–8	13	The Fortunes of Nigel	1822	London and Greenwich (England)	Frank Jordan	2004	406
1644-5	07b	A Legend of Montrose	1819	Scottish Highlands	J. H. Alexander	1993	183
1651-2	19	Woodstock or The Cavalier	1826	Woodstock and Windsor (England); Brussels, in the Spanish Netherlands	Tony Inglis with J. H. Alexander, David Hewitt, and Alison Lumsden	2009	417
1658–80	14	Peveril of the Peak	1822	Derbyshire, the Isle of Man, and London	Alison Lumsden	2007	495
1679–89	04b	The Tale of Old Mortality	1816	Southern Scotland	Douglas Mack	1993	353
1689	12	The Pirate	1822	Shetland and Orkney	Alison Lumsden and Mark Weinstein	2001	391
1707	04a	The Black Dwarf	1816	Scottish Borders	P. D. Garside	1993	124
1709–11	07a	The Bride of Lammermoor	1819	East Lothian (Scotland)	J. H. Alexander	1993	269
1715–6	05	Rob Roy	1818	Northumberland (England), and the environs of Loch Lomond (Scotland)	David Hewitt	2008	343
1736	06	The Heart of Midlothian	1818	Edinburgh and Richmond, London	David Hewitt and Alison Lumsden	2004	469
1745–6	01	Waverley or 'Tis Sixty Years Since	1814	Perthshire (Scotland)	P. D. Garside	2007	365
1760-5, 1781–2	02	Guy Mannering or The Astrologer	1815	Galloway (Scotland)	P. D. Garside	1999	355
1766	17	Redgauntlet	1824	Southern Scotland, and Cumberland (England)	G. A. M. Wood with David Hewitt	1997	380
1760s-1781	20	The Surgeon's Daughter	1827	Fife and Edinburgh, (Scotland) and Madras, Srirangapatna, Bangalore, and Mysore (South India)	Claire Lamont	2001	128
1775	20	The Highland Widow	1827	Oban (Scotland)	Claire Lamont	2001	55
1794	03	The Antiquary	1816	North-East Scotland	David Hewitt	1995	356
1795	20	The Two Drovers	1827	Doune and Falkirk, (Scotland) and Cumberland (North West England)	Claire Lamont	2001	22
1804-20	16	Saint Ronan's Well	1824	Southern Scotland	Mark Weinstein	1995	373
18th century	24	The Shorter Fiction: 1 The Inferno of Altisidora; 2 Christopher Corduroy; 3 Alarming Increase of Depravity Among Animals; 4 Phantasmagoria; 5 My Aunt Margaret's Mirror; 6 The Tapestried Chamber; 7 The Death of the Laird's Jock; 8 A Highland Anecdote	1811-32	Various	Graham Tulloch and Judy King	2009	100
1829-32	25a 25b	Introductions and Notes from the Magnum Opus	1829-33		J. H. Alexander with P. D. Garside and Claire Lamont	2012	492; 776
