= Woodstock (novel) =

1826 novel by Walter Scott

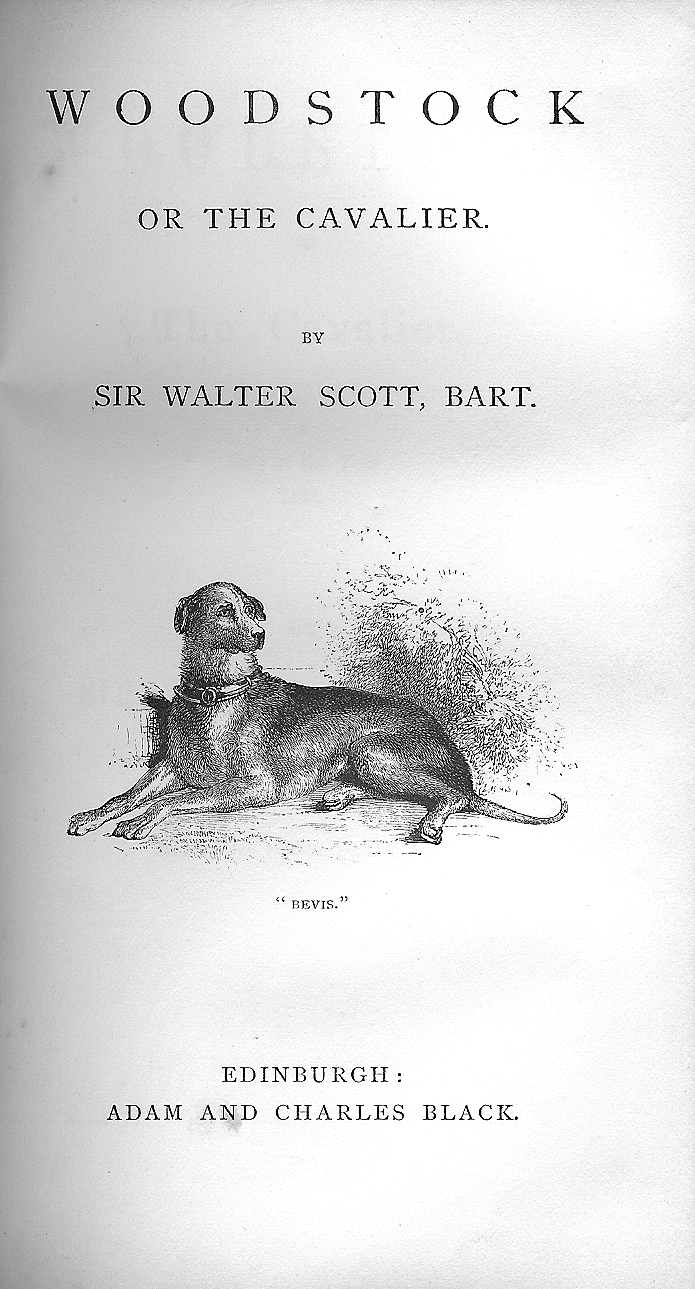
- "Bevis", on the frontispiece of the 1863 edition by A & C Black
- Author: Sir Walter Scott
- Language: English
- Series: Waverley Novels
- Genre: Historical novel
- Publisher: Archibald Constable and Co. (Edinburgh); Longman, Rees, Orme, Brown, and Green]] (London)
- Publication date: 1826
- Publication place: Scotland
- Media type: Print
- Pages: 417 (Edinburgh Edition, 2009)
- Preceded by: The Talisman
- Followed by: Chronicles of the Canongate

Woodstock, or The Cavalier. A Tale of the Year Sixteen Hundred and Fifty-one is an 1826 historical novel by Sir Walter Scott, the 22nd in the series of Waverley novels. Set just after the English Civil War, it was inspired by the legend of the Good Devil of Woodstock, which in 1649 supposedly tormented parliamentary commissioners who had taken possession of a royal residence at Woodstock, Oxfordshire. The story deals with the escape of Charles II in 1652, during the Commonwealth, and his final triumphant entry into London on 29 May 1660.

== Composition and sources ==
Scott began composing Woodstock at the very end of October 1825. He made rapid progress at first, but there were many interruptions during December and the second volume was not finished until 11 February 1826. He completed the final volume on 26 March.

The History of England by David Hume (1754‒62), which Scott admired above all others, gave him most of what he needed for the historical background, though for many details he was able to draw on his profound acquaintance with the literature of the seventeenth century. For the goings-on at Woodstock Manor he was familiar with two accounts accepting a supernatural explanation–in Satan's Invisible world Discovered by George Sinclair (1685), and Saducismus Triumphatus by Joseph Glanvil (1700). He also knew, though not necessarily first hand, the version of the story in The Natural History of Oxford-shire by Robert Plot (1677), adopting its more skeptical approach.

== Editions ==
The first edition of Woodstock was published in Edinburgh by Archibald Constable and Co. and Longman, Rees, Orme, Brown, and Green in London on 28 April 1826. As with all the Waverley novels before 1827 publication was anonymous. The price was one and a half guineas (£1 11s 6d or £1.57½.). Scott does not seems to have revisited the novel until the spring of 1831 when he revised the text and provided an introduction and notes for the 'Magnum' edition, in which it appeared as Volumes 39 and 40 in August and September 1832.

The standard modern edition, by Tony Inglis with J. H. Alexander, David Hewitt, and Alison Lumsden, was published as Volume 19 of the Edinburgh Edition of the Waverley Novels in 2009: this is based on the first edition with emendations mainly from the manuscript and corrected proofs; the 'Magnum' material appears in Volume 25b (2012).

== Plot summary ==
At a thanksgiving service in Woodstock church for the victory at Worcester (3 September 1651), the Rev. Nehemiah Holdenough was compelled to cede the pulpit, which he had usurped from the late rector (Dr Rochecliffe), to Joseph Tomkins, who, in military attire, declaimed against monarchy and prelacy, and announced the sequestration of the royal lodge and park by Oliver Cromwell and his followers. Proceeding thither, he encountered Sir Henry Lee, accompanied by his daughter Alice, prepared to surrender his charge, and was conducted through the principal apartments by the forester Joliffe, who managed to send his sweetheart Phoebe and dog Bevis with some provisions to his hut, in which the knight and his daughter had arranged to sleep. On arriving there they found Colonel Everard, a Roundhead who had come to offer them his own and his father's protection; but Sir Henry abused and spurned his nephew as a rebel, and at Alice's entreaty he bade them farewell, as he feared, for ever. On his way to the lodge he met his Royalist friend, Captain Wildrake, whom he was sheltering in spite of his politics, and determined to send him with an appeal to Cromwell to reinstate his uncle at Woodstock. On reaching Windsor, the captain, disguised as a Roundhead, obtained an interview with Oliver Cromwell, and a compliance with Everard's request, on condition that he would aid in securing the murdered king's son, in the event of his seeking refuge with the Lees.

Armed with the warrant of ejectment, the colonel and Wildrake, accompanied by the mayor and the minister, visited the Commissioners during their evening carouse, and took part in endeavouring to ascertain the cause of some startling occurrences by which they had been disturbed. Everard made his way alone to a dark gallery, in which he fancied he heard his cousin's voice, and suddenly felt a sword at his throat. Meeting Wildrake as he regained the hall, they hurried off to the hut where they found Dr Rochecliffe reading the Church service to Sir Henry and his daughter; and, after a reconciliation between uncle and nephew, the cousins were allowed a private interview, during which Alice warned her lover against betraying the king. Returning to the lodge they were told of other unaccountable events; and during the night Everard was ordered by an apparition to change his quarters. The sentinels also declared that they had heard strange sounds, and the Commissioners decided to retire to the village inn. Master Holdenough, too, confessed that he had been terribly shocked by the reflection in a mirror of the figure of a college friend whom he had seen drowned.

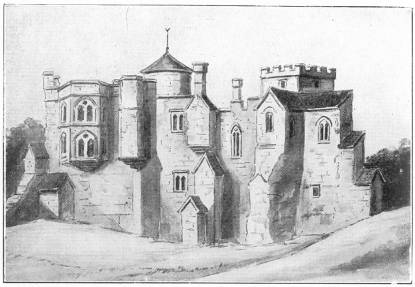
Woodstock Palace

The following day Sir Henry Lee was induced to resume his post, and his son Albert arrived with one "Louis Kerneguy", whom he introduced as his Scotch page. Sir Henry having no suspicion who his guest really was treated him without ceremony; and while Dr Rochecliffe and the colonel were planning for his escape to Holland, the disguised Charles amused himself by endeavouring to gain Alice's love; but, in spite of a declaration of his rank, she made him ashamed of his suit. A quarrel, however, having arisen between him and Everard, she evinced her loyalty by preventing a duel they had arranged, at the risk of her reputation and the loss of her cousin's affection. A similar attempt by Tomkins to trifle with Phoebe was punished by a death-blow from Joliffe. The next evening Everard and his friend, and Holdenough, were unexpectedly made prisoners by Cromwell, who, having received intelligence of their knowledge of the king's sojourn at Woodstock, had brought a large force to secure him. Wildrake, however, managed to send his page Spitfire to the lodge to warn them, and while Alice acted as Charles's guide, Albert, in his dress, concealed himself in Rosamond's tower. Cromwell and his soldiers arrived soon afterwards with Dr Rochecliffe and Joliffe, whom they had seized as they were burying Tomkins, and, having searched all the rooms and passages in vain, they proceeded to blow up the tower. Albert, however, leapt from it just before the explosion, and Cromwell was furious when he discovered the deception. In his rage he ordered the execution of the old knight and all his abettors, including his dog; but afterwards released them, with the exception of Albert, who was imprisoned, and subsequently fell in the battle of Dunkirk (1658). Alice returned in safety, with the news that the king had effected his escape, and a letter from him to Sir Henry, approving of her marriage with Everard, whose political opinions had been considerably influenced by recent events.

Eight years later Wildrake arrived at Brussels with news for Charles. After Cromwell's son Richard abdicated, the Protectorate was abolished and the country descended into chaos. Order was restored when George Monck, the Governor of Scotland, marched into the City of London with his army and forced the Rump Parliament to re-admit members of the Long Parliament excluded during Pride's Purge. The Long Parliament dissolved itself and for the first time in almost 20 years, there was a general election. The Convention Parliament assembled and voted for Charles' restoration. In his progress to London, Charles, escorted by a brilliant retinue, amidst shouts of welcome from his assembled subjects, dismounted to salute a family group in which the central figure was the old knight of Ditchley, whose venerable features expressed his appreciation of the happiness of once more pressing his sovereign's hand, and whose contented death almost immediately followed the realization of his anxious and long-cherished hopes.

== Characters ==
Principal characters in bold

- **Sir Henry Lee of Ditchley**, keeper of Woodstock Park
- **Albert Lee**, his son, a Royalist colonel
- **Alice Lee**, his daughter
- Dr Anthony Rochecliffe, late rector of Woodstock
- Rev Nehemiah Holdenough, a Presbyterian minister
- Colonel **Markham Everard**, a Roundhead, Sir Henry's nephew
- Joceline Joliffe, a Royalist forester, and Sir Henry's servant
- Phoebe Mayflower, his sweetheart
- Commissioners of the Council of State
  - Colonel Desborough
  - General Harrison
  - Joshua Bletson
- Joseph Tomkins, their steward
- Captain **Roger Wildrake**, of Squattlesea-mere
- Spitfire, his page
- **Oliver Cromwell**
- Zerobabel Robins, a Parliamentary soldier (Zerubbabel in some editions)
- Captain Pearson, his aide-de-camp
- **Louis Kerneguy**, a page, the future Charles II of England
- Bevis, a wolf-dog

== Chapter summary ==
Volume One

Preface: The Author has extracted the following Memoirs from the papers of the [fictitious] 17th-century Rector of Woodstock the Rev. J. A. Rochecliffe, D. D.

Ch. 1: Nehemiah Holdenough, a Presbyterian minister, is displaced in the pulpit of Woodstock parish church by an Independent [Joseph Tomkins] who is heckled by Josceline Joliffe, a royalist forester.

Ch. 2: In the park, Tomkins overhears the staunch royalist Sir Henry Lee and his daughter Alice discussing their family's divided political allegiances. After initially resisting, Sir Henry submits to him as a steward of the Parliamentary Commissioners, and the Lees leave to seek shelter in Joliffe's hut.

Ch. 3: Tomkins and Joliffe spar verbally on their way to the Lodge, where Joliffe despatches Phoebe Mayflower to his hut with refreshments.

Ch. 4: At the hut Markham Everard offers Sir Henry and Alice his assistance, but it is indignantly rejected by his uncle.

Ch. 5: On his way to the Lodge, Markham encounters Roger Wildrake. Tomkins agrees, without enthusiasm, to afford the pair a night's lodging.

Ch. 6: Markham composes an appeal to Cromwell, to be delivered by Wildrake, for the preservation of Woodstock from sequestration.

Ch. 7: Wildrake arrives at Windsor and has an interview with Cromwell.

Ch. 8: Wildrake obtains from Cromwell an order consigning the Lodge to Markham's keeping, and delivers it to him at a Woodstock inn.

Ch. 9: On the way to the Lodge, Markham, Wildrake, the Mayor of Woodstock, and Holdenough discuss the order and the stories of supernatural goings-on there.

Ch. 10: The three Commissioners present at the Lodge—Desborough, Harrison, and Bletson—are introduced to the reader.

Ch. 11: The Commissioners, Mark, and Wildrake discuss strange happenings at the Lodge. Markham thinks he hears two warning voices, one which he takes to be Alice's, the other belonging to a man by whom he is slightly wounded.

Volume Two

Ch. 1 (12): At Joliffe's hut Markham attempts to assure Sir Henry, and then Alice, of his integrity.

Ch. 2 (13): As they return to the Lodge, Wildrake tells Markham that he believes Cromwell views the Lodge as a device to attract and trap the fugitive King. Wildrake fights a crazed Harrison, who believes the cavalier is the ghost of the actor Dick Robison whom he had murdered, before Markham calms the pair.

Ch. 3 (14): Markham again hears the warning voices and fires without effect in the direction of two forms.

Ch. 4 (15): The three Commissioners reluctantly agree to vacate the Lodge in compliance with Cromwell's order.

Ch. 5 (16): Holdenough tells Markham that he believes he has seen the spirit of his fellow-student Albany, who had become a priest and had been killed at his instigation during an attack on a royalist house. Markham persuades him to assist the Lees if it should prove necessary.

Ch. 6 (17): On his return to the Lodge, Sir Henry spars verbally with Tomkins and rejoices with Joliffe. At Rosamond's Well, Alice encounters a female fortune-teller [Charles in disguise], who drops a ring in her pitcher.

Ch. 7 (18): Albert Lee arrives at the Lodge unexpectedly, and narrowly escapes injury when his father thinks he is an intruder.

Ch. 8 (19): Albert says that Charles has escaped after the battle of Worcester. He introduces his page Louis Kerneguy [Charles in another disguise], who is teased by the drunken Wildrake.

Ch. 9 (20): Charles and Albert discuss the situation in private.

Ch. 10 (21): Dr Rochecliffe, the deposed vicar of Woodstock, advises Albert that the Lodge is as safe a refuge for Charles as anywhere. Alice praises the King's virtues (but not his appearance) in Louis's presence.

Ch. 11 (22): Louis defends the King's behaviour before escaping from Sir Henry's Shakespeare recitation. He determines to discontinue his attempts to seduce Alice.

Ch 12 (23): Alarmed by Louis's advances towards Alice, Phoebe decides to alert Markham. Inadvertently snubbed by Alice, Louis gets into a fight with Markham, who believes him to be Lord Wilmot, the original owner of the ring of Ch. 17.

Volume Three

Ch. 1 (24): Sir Henry interrupts the fight between Louis and Markham, and disputes with latter about Milton.

Ch. 2 (25): Alice rejects Louis's advances, even when he acknowledges himself to be Charles.

Ch. 3 (26): Wildrake delivers a challenge from Markham to Louis, who eventually decides to accept it. Rochecliffe arranges with Alice that they should combine to prevent the duel.

Ch. 4 (27): When they arrive at the spot selected for the encounter, Alice is unable to explain to Markham why Louis's safety is so important. Charles resolves matters by disclosing his identity, and Markham promises to help him as far as his duties to the Commonwealth permit.

Ch. 5 (28): Phoebe repels the advances of Tomkins at Rosamond's Well, and he is killed by Joliffe.

Ch. 6 (29): Cromwell arrives at Woodstock, survives an assault by Wildrake, and begins searching for Charles, placing Markham under arrest. Wildrake sends his page Spitfire to Alice at the Lodge with a feather to indicate Cromwell's arrival.

Ch. 7 (30): Albert arrives at the Lodge to make preparations for Charles's departure. Bevis brings Tomkins's glove, and Joliffe and Rochecliffe find his body and set about burying it.

Ch. 8 (31): Spitfire brings Wildrake's feather, and Charles reveals his identity to Sir Henry as preparations for his departure are made. Sir Henry and Albert make arrangements for delaying the pursuit.

Ch. 9 (32): Cromwell finds Joliffe and Rochecliffe burying Tomkins. He suffers a fit of hesitation, but Pearson encourages him to proceed. Effecting entry to the Lodge by means of a petard, Cromwell interrogates Sir Henry and proceeds to search the labyrinthine building.

Ch. 10 (33): Cromwell supervises an attack on a turret, from which Albert (impersonating Charles) jumps.

Ch. 11 (34): Albert is revealed and condemned to death by Cromwell along with the other prisoners. Captain Pearson is reluctant to execute the sentence.

Ch. 12 (35): As the prisoners await execution, Rochecliffe discloses to Holdforth that he is the Albany of Ch. 16.

Ch. 13 (36): Prompted by the soldier Zerobabel Robins, Cromwell pardons the prisoners one by one. Sir Henry receives a letter from Charles giving his blessing to the union of Alice and Markham.

Ch. 14 (37): [The final chapter is set in 1660] Wildrake brings news to Charles in Brussels of the political changes in Britain which make it possible for him to return as the restored monarch. On his way to London he passes the Lee-Everard family and receives Sir Henry's blessing before the old man dies.

== Reception ==
There was very general agreement among the reviewers that Woodstock occupied a middle rank in the Waverley novels, with a handful rating it highly and two or three condemning it. Little enthusiasm is discernible for the thin plot and the tedious succession of tricks played on the Commissioners in the Lodge. On the other hand, several of the characters were more often than not deemed impressive. Doubts were expressed about Cromwell's historicity and tendency towards the sentimental, but he was widely recognised as a strong presentation. Charles was also deemed a success, as were Lee, Alice, and Wildrake in their different ways. Views differed on the question of authorial impartiality or otherwise. A formidable essay in The Westminster Review analysed Scott's lack of historical verisimilitude in his presentation of the characters, concentrating on the stylistic incoherence of their dialogue.

== Cultural references ==
In Two Years Before the Mast the author/narrator recounts reading Woodstock to his fellow sailors.
