= King Richard and the Crusaders =

1954 film by David Butler

- Theatrical poster
- Directed by: David Butler
- Screenplay by: John Twist
- Based on: The Talisman; 1825 novel by Sir Walter Scott
- Produced by: Henry Blanke
- Starring: Rex Harrison; Virginia Mayo; George Sanders; Laurence Harvey
- Narrated by: Lester Matthews
- Cinematography: J. Peverell Marley
- Edited by: Irene Morra
- Music by: Max Steiner
- Color process: Warnercolor
- Production company: Warner Bros. Pictures
- Distributed by: Warner Bros. Pictures
- Release date: August 7, 1954
- Running time: 114 minutes
- Country: United States
- Language: English
- Budget: $3,000,000 (estimated)
- Box office: $2,100,000 (USA)

King Richard and the Crusaders is a 1954 American historical drama based on Sir Walter Scott's The Talisman made by Warner Bros. Pictures. The film stars Rex Harrison, Virginia Mayo, George Sanders and Laurence Harvey, with Robert Douglas, Michael Pate and Paula Raymond. It was directed by David Butler and produced by Henry Blanke from a screenplay by John Twist based on Sir Walter Scott's 1825 novel The Talisman. The music score was by Max Steiner and the cinematography by J. Peverell Marley. This was Warner Bros.' first essay into CinemaScope. King Richard and the Crusaders was listed in the 1978 book The Fifty Worst Films of All Time.

== Synopsis ==
In 1191, King Richard the Lionheart, along with several other European monarchs, is in the Holy Land intent on retaking Jerusalem from the Saracens. There is much infighting and outright treachery in the European encampment however. Two nobles in particular, Sir Giles Amaury and Conrad of Montferrat, want to eliminate the English king and attempt to have him assassinated. Severely wounded and on his deathbed, Richard is brought back to health by a Saracen doctor recruited by one of his loyal knights, Sir Kenneth of Huntingdon. The king recovers from his wounds but when he hears that Sir Kenneth wishes to marry Lady Edith Plantagenet, the knight is banished only to be taken in by the very doctor who treated the king and who has an altogether different identity.

== Plot ==
The film begins with King Richard the Lionheart planning to attack the Saracens and defeat their leader, Sultan Saladin. Little does Richard know, though, the Castelaine knights who are supposed to follow him have other plans of their own. Giles Amaury, a Castelaine supporter, sets up an assassination attempt of the King using a poisoned Saracen arrow in hopes that the arrow will kill the King, frame the enemy, and allow Giles to promote one of his own to overtake the Saracens and be the victorious ruler of the land. The assassination attempt fails, and King Richard is discovered to still be alive, just before a new leader is about to be named. At this time, Sir Kenneth of Huntington enters King Richard's camp, blaming Giles and the Castelaine knights for the assassination attempt. Kenneth announces his loyalty to the King, but the King dismisses his thought that his own knights would assassinate him. The King then sends Kenneth to lead the Queen's caravan as a scout to prove his loyalty to the kingdom.

On his scouting voyage, Kenneth crosses paths with a Saracen, and the two begin to duel. This does not last long though, as the two come to a chivalrous agreement to end the fighting and discuss their intentions of crossing through the desert. At this time, Kenneth learns that this Saracen is a physician named Emir Ilderim, sent by Saladin to heal King Richard. He says Saladin offers a truce until Richard is healed, because he would like to speak with him in person about the affairs of the nation and the war. Kenneth helps Ilderim get to Richard safely, and King Richard accepts the terms of Saladin's truce and the help of his physician to return to full health.

Ilderim successfully heals King Richard, but not without stirring up trouble in the King's camp first. After his return, Kenneth is given another chance to prove himself to King Richard by guarding the English flag that flies at the outskirts of the camp. At the same time, Ilderim is speaking with Lady Edith Plantagenet, Richard's relative and Kenneth's love interest, and suggests to her that a marriage between a beautiful Christian woman (Edith) and a Muslim leader could bring peace to the land, without war. Kenneth sees this proposal and gets jealous, leaving his post at the flag to confront Ilderim. At this time, we see the Castelaine knights re-enter the story and knock down the English flag that Kenneth is supposed to be guarding. King Richard enters and sees Kenneth speaking with Edith and the flag on the ground. Richard becomes furious and sentences Kenneth to trial by combat. At the trial, Richard gains the upper hand, knocking Kenneth unconscious, but before he kills him, Ilderim asks the King to spare Kenneth's life, stating that he will take him back to the Saracens and Kenneth will no longer be allowed in the English kingdom. The King, respecting the chivalry of Saladin to send Ilderim, agrees and banishes Kenneth from England.

When Kenneth awakes from the battle, he is in the Saracen camp being healed by Ilderim and living like royalty. Despite these gifts and Ilderim's kindness to save his life, Kenneth can only think of Edith and how he is going to return to her. Ilderim then explains to Kenneth that he is banished, but that he needs his help. Ilderim reveals to Kenneth that he is actually Saladin, ruler of the Saracens, and that he has found who is trying to overthrow King Richard, the Castelaine knights. Kenneth returns to King Richard in disguise to warn him about the danger he is in.

The Castelaines overhear Kenneth warning Richard of their plan. They then steal away Edith and attempt to return to the Castelaine castle and defend themselves from there. Because of the mutual interests in Edith by Richard, Kenneth, and Saladin, the three unite to defeat the Castelaines. After a successful battle and chase across the country side, the Castelaines are defeated, Kenneth and Edith plan to marry, King Richard forgives Kenneth, and Saladin rides away safely back to his kingdom.

== Cast ==
- Rex Harrison as Emir Ilderim/Sultan Saladin
- Virginia Mayo as Lady Edith Plantagenet
- George Sanders as King Richard the Lionheart
- Laurence Harvey as Sir Kenneth of Huntington
- Robert Douglas as Sir Giles Amaury
- Michael Pate as Conrad, Marquis of Montferrat
- Paula Raymond as Queen Berengaria
- Lester Matthews as Archbishop of Tyre / Narrator
- Anthony Eustrel as Baron De Vaux
- Henry Corden as King Philip of France
- Wilton Graff as Duke Leopold of Austria
- Nick Cravat as Nectobanus
- Nejla Ates as Moorish Dancing Girl
- Leslie Bradley as Castelaine Captain
- Bruce Lester as Castelaine
- Mark Dana as Castelaine
- Peter Ortiz as Castelaine
- John Holland as Castelaine Man-at-Arms (uncredited)

== Production ==
The box office success of Ivanhoe saw Hollywood develop a number of films based on Walter Scott novels including Rob Roy, Quentin Durward and The Talisman. The Talisman was announced by Warners in August 1953 as a possible vehicle for Errol Flynn. John Becjman signed to do the sets, and Henry Blanke would produce.

The original title was The Talisman. David Butler was announced as director in October 1953. The following month Rex Harrison's casting was announced. The movie would be one of Warners' first in CinemaScope.

Filming started in January 1954. There was two weeks location work in Yuma near Arizona plus filming at Ventura and Warners Ranch.

The title was changed to King Richard and the Crusaders in April 1954.

It was the first Hollywood movie for Laurence Harvey.

David Butler called it "a good picture" and said when on location in Yuma they would film until 10.30 am then stop because it was too hot and start at three o'clock. The director said "we had great camaraderie on that picture" despite four stars, adding that Harvey "was very ambitious and worked very hard".

== Reception ==
François Truffaut later wrote "we know that a bad American film goes over better than a bad French film. King Richard and the Crusaders confirms this. A childish scenario, simplistic dialogues. Who cares since the rhythm does not falter, since the colour is gay and the scenario is correct? The spectator who watches this movie is "comfortable"."

Rex Harrison called it "an absolutely rotten picture" although "it was the first horsy picture I'd played in and I was fascinated."

== Historical aspects in production ==
The Castelaine Knights from the movie are an invented group that plays the villain. They are supposed to be playing the part of the "Knights Templar". There are two theories as to why these characters were changed from Knights Templar to Castelaines. The first is because of Production Code that prevents negative representation of clergy in film. The second is because the producers wanted to avoid upsetting the Masonic Knights Templar, a group that many Hollywood figures were members of. It is unclear which theory, if either, is that actual reason for changing the name.

In Lorraine Stock's article, "Now Starring in the Third Crusade: Depictions of Richard I and Saladin in Films and Television Series", she suggests that the casting of George Sanders as Richard was relevant to the time period. By choosing a "grey-haired, avuncular" leader, it appears they were returning to the idea of the mature monarch, mirroring the current leaders of the 1950s in Winston Churchill and Dwight D. Eisenhower.

Stock further asserts that Rex Harrison's character, Saladin, is misrepresented in the film in an "ultimately demeaning way". In addition to the use of brown face paint, the use of disguise and trickery by the Muslim leader is greatly exaggerated in the movie. The leader is feminized throughout the movie as well with his gaudy, light colored robes and gang of belly dancers.

Lorraine Stock points out some of the anti-war sentiment in the movie. Three of the main characters, Sir Kenneth, Lady Edith, and Saladin, at some point mention their disapproval of war and discuss how unnecessary it is. Stock suggests this is a reflection of the audience's viewpoint and an anti-war movement of the 1950s with audiences still remembering World War II and the more recent Korean War of 1950–1953.

== Comic book adaption ==
- Dell Four Color #588 (October 1954) • Drawn by Matt Baker

== Notes ==
- Butler, David (1993). David Butler. Directors Guild of America.
