= The Betrothed (Scott novel) =

1825 novel by Walter Scott

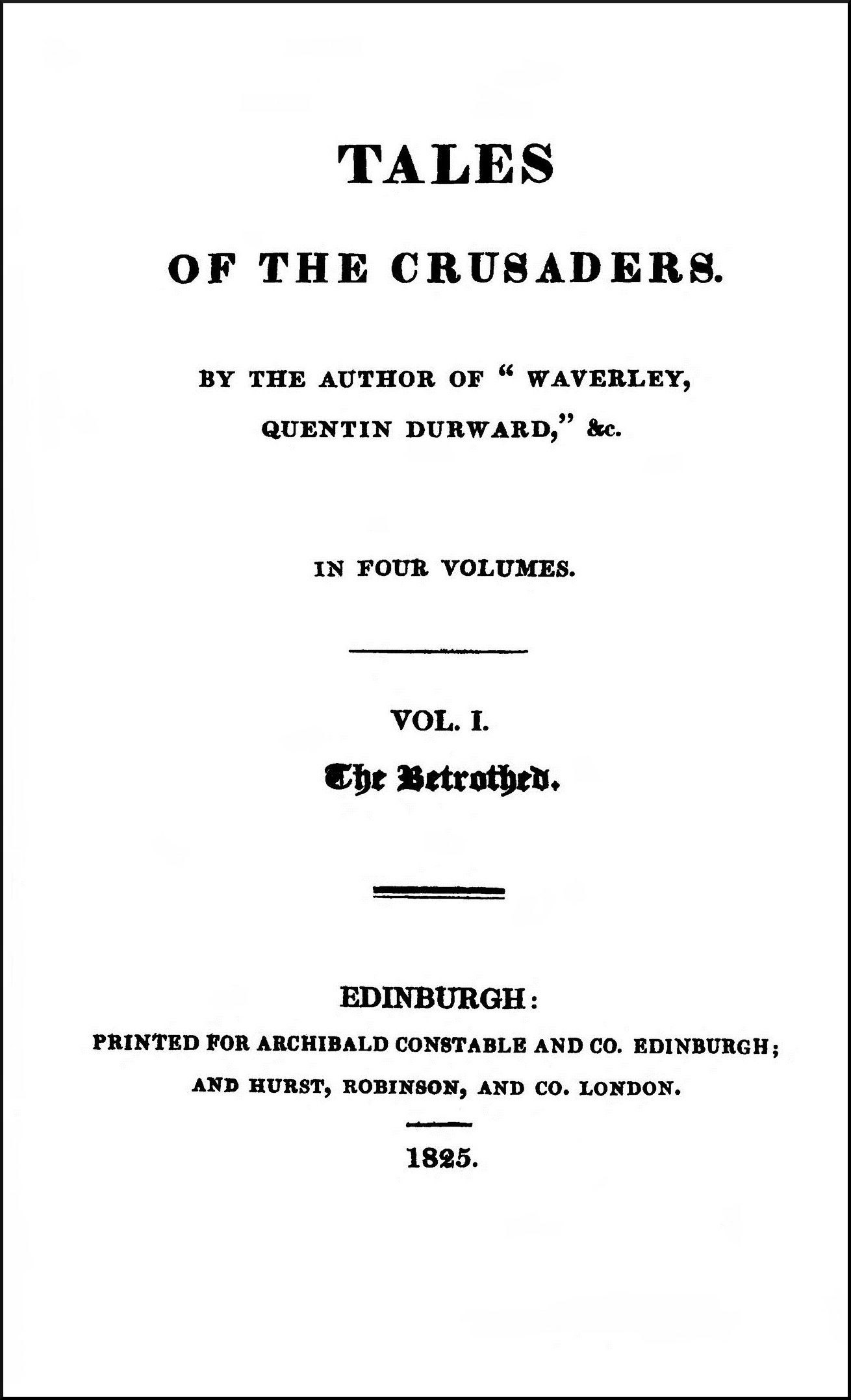
- Author: Sir Walter Scott
- Language: English
- Series: Tales of the Crusaders; Waverley Novels
- Genre: Historical novel
- Publisher: Archibald Constable and Co. (Edinburgh); Hurst, Robinson, and Co. (London)
- Publication date: 1825
- Publication place: Scotland
- Media type: Print
- Pages: 278 (Edinburgh Edition, 2009)
- Preceded by: Redgauntlet
- Followed by: The Talisman

The Betrothed is one of the Waverley novels by Sir Walter Scott, published in 1825. Set in the Welsh Marches in the 12th century, it is the first of two Tales of the Crusaders, the second being The Talisman.

Parts of the novel were incorporated into Francesco Maria Piave's libretto for Giuseppe Verdi's 1857 opera, Aroldo, itself a re-working of an earlier Verdi opera, Stiffelio.

== Composition and sources ==
At the beginning of April 1824, two months before he completed Redgauntlet, Scott envisaged that it would be followed by a four-volume publication containing two tales, at least one of which would be based on the Crusades. He began composition of the first story, The Betrothed, in June, but progress was to be excruciatingly slow. Initially the problem was numerous interruptions with visitors to Abbotsford. By mid-August proofs had only passed the middle of the first volume and in September Scott was able to write only sporadically, so that the first volume was not complete until early October. Then there were objections to the novel from James Ballantyne, and it is likely that at some point in the autumn Scott changed course and began the companion novel The Talisman. On 17 December it was actually decided that The Betrothed should be formally laid aside, though the second volume was well advanced, and the sheets already printed were sealed up. In mid-February 1825 the December decision was rescinded and composition was complete by mid-March, though Scott returned to the work to adjust the conclusion at the beginning of June.

Like all of Scott's novels The Betrothed is full of literary echoes, particularly from medieval romances. For the prominent Welsh element he made considerable use of two sources, one dating from the twelfth century, the other a product of his own time: the translation by Sir Richard Colt Hoare from the original Latin of The Itinerary of Archbishop Baldwin through Wales by Giraldus Cambrensis (1806), and The Cambrian Biography by William Owen (1803).

== Editions ==
The first edition was published as part of Tales of the Crusaders in Edinburgh by Archibald Constable and Co. on 22 June 1825. It was advertised for publication by Hurst, Robinson, and Co. in London on the same date, but apparently not issued until 11 July. The price was two guineas (£2 2s or £2.10). As with all of the Waverley novels until 1827 publication was anonymous. There is no conclusive evidence that Scott returned to The Betrothed until the spring of 1831 when he revised the text and provided an introduction and notes for the 'Magnum' edition, in which it appeared as Volume 37 in June 1832.

The standard modern edition, by J. B. Ellis with J. H. Alexander and David Hewitt, was published as Volume 18a of the Edinburgh Edition of the Waverley Novels in 2009: this is based on the first edition with emendations mainly from the manuscript; the 'Magnum' material appears in Volume 25b (2012).

== Plot introduction ==
The action takes place in the Welsh Marches during the latter part of the reign of Henry II, after 1187. Eveline, the 16-year-old daughter of Sir Raymond Berenger, is rescued from a Welsh siege by the forces of Damian Lacy. She is betrothed to his uncle Sir Hugo, who leaves on a crusade. Rebels led by Ranald Lacy attempt to kidnap her, and Damian fights them off, but a confused sequence of events convinces the King that she and her beloved are in league against him.

== Plot summary ==
Baldwin, the Archbishop of Canterbury, had exhorted the Britons, and the Anglo-Normans who were settled on the borders of the Welsh principalities, to lay aside their feuds and join in the third Crusade. Accordingly, Gwenwyn, the Prince of Powys-land, and Sir Raymond Berenger, the Knight of Garde Doloureuse, had accepted each other's hospitality, and Gwenwyn, at the suggestion of his chaplain, had arranged to divorce his wife Brengwan, in order that he might marry Sir Raymond's daughter Eveline. In reply to his proposal, however, a messenger brought a letter stating that she was promised to Sir Hugo de Lacy, the Constable of Chester. This being taken by the Welsh as an affront, the call to war was sung by the bards, the Norman castle was attacked, and its owner slain in a combat with his would-be son-in-law. Nerved by the presence of Eveline on the battlements, and supplied with food by a ruse of her father's vassal the Flemish weaver, the garrison, assisted by the military predilections of their chaplain, held out until Damian Lacy arrived with a large force, when the brave but unarmoured Britons were repulsed, and their prince Gwenwyn was killed.

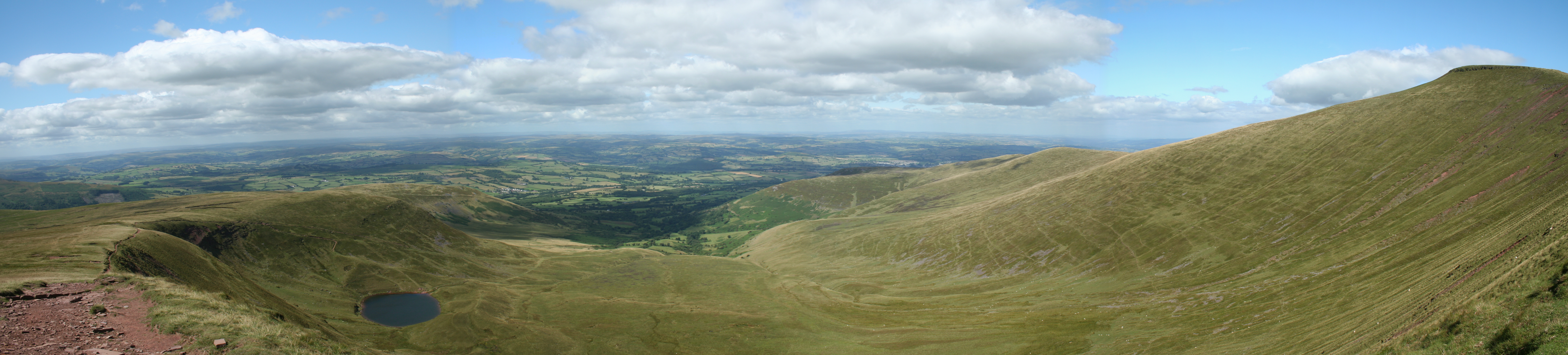
View from Corn Du, Powys

Having granted an interview to her deliverer, Eveline was escorted by her suitor the Constable, and a numerous retinue, to her aunt's nunnery at Gloucester. On her way thither she passed a night at the house of a Saxon kinswoman, the Lady of Baldringham, where she occupied a haunted chamber, and saw the ghost of an ancestor's wife, who foretold that she would be

Widowed wife, and married maid,
Betrothed, betrayer, and betrayed.

During her visit to the abbess she was formally espoused to Sir Hugo; but the archbishop having the next day commanded him to proceed to Palestine for three years, he offered to annul their engagement. Eveline, contrary to her aunt's advice, promised to await his return; and it was arranged that she should reside in her castle, with Rose and Dame Gillian as her attendants, and Damian as her guardian. Wearied with her monotonous life during this seclusion, she was induced one day to join in a hawking expedition unaccompanied by her usual escort, and was seized by rebels secretly instigated by Ranald Lacy. In attempting to rescue her Damian was severely wounded, and she insisted on nursing him in the castle, while Amelot led his men-at-arms in pursuit of the outlaws, whose disaffection had reached the king's ears, with a rumour that Damian was their captain. Sir Guy Monthermer was, accordingly, sent to demand admittance to Garde Doloureuse, where he was reported to be concealed; and when Eveline ordered the portcullis to be dropped against him, a herald proclaimed her, and all who aided and abetted her, as traitors.

The constable and his squire, who were supposed to be dead, returned from Syria, disguised as palmers, just as the royal troops, headed by Prince Richard, had occupied the castle, Eveline at the same time being sent to a convent, and Damian consigned to a dungeon. Having learnt the ill news from old Raoul and his wife, Sir Hugo made his way towards King Henry's camp, near which, surrounded by an assembly of spectators, Ranald Lacy, who by false representations had obtained a grant of Eveline's forfeited lands, and assumed his kinsman's dress and title, was about to present a royal charter of immunities to a procession of the Flemish settlers. Cadwallon, the Welsh bard, had, however, attached himself to Sir Hugo as a Breton minstrel, in order that he might avenge the death of Gwenwyn; and mistaking Ranald for the returned constable, suddenly sprang behind him as he leant forward in his saddle, and stabbed him in the back. Sir Hugo now made himself known, and was welcomed by the king, the assassin was executed, and, convinced that his betrothed's love had been given to Damian, the old Crusader resigned her to him, and consoled himself by taking part in the subjugation of Ireland.

== Characters ==
Principal characters in bold

- Gwenwyn, the Prince of Powys-land
- Brengwain, his wife
- Father Einion, his chaplain
- Jorworth ap Jevan, his messenger
- **Cadwallon**, his principal bard
- Caradoc of Menwygent, another bard
- Baldwin, Archbishop of Canterbury
- Sir Raymond Berenger, of Garde Doloureuse
- **Eveline Berenger**, his daughter
- The Benedictine Abbess at Gloucester, his sister
- Father Aldrovand, his chaplain
- Dennis Morolt, his squire
- Reinold, his butler
- Raoul Gillian, his huntsman
- Dame Gillian, his wife
- **Sir Hugo de Lacy**, Constable of Chester
- **Damian de Lacy**, his nephew
- **Randal de Lacy**, their kinsman
- Wild Wenlock, another kinsman
- Philip Guarine, Sir Hugo's squire
- Amelot, Damian Lacy's page
- Ralph Genvil, his banner-bearer
- **Wilkin Flammock**, a Flemish weaver
- **Rose Flammock**, his daughter, and Eveline's waiting-maid
- Ermingarde, the Lady of Baldringham
- Berwine, her housekeeper
- Hundwolf, her steward
- Guy de Monthermer, in command of the King's troops
- King Henry II of England
- Prince Richard and Prince John, his sons

== Chapter summary ==
Introduction (to Tales of the Crusaders): 'Minutes of sederunt of a general meeting of the share-holders designing to form a joint-stock company, united for the purpose of writing and publishing the class of works called the Waverley Novels'.

Volume One

Ch. 1: The Welsh prince Guenwyn plans to marry Eveline, daughter of his old Norman rival Raymond Beranger, and begins proceedings to divorce his wife Brengwain.

Ch. 2: Guenwyn receives a letter from Raymond rejecting his proposal, and turns his thought to war.

Ch. 3: As the Welsh forces advance on the Garde Douloureuse, Raymond tells his squire Morolt and Wilkin Flammock that he has vowed to afford Guenwyn a fair field. Entrusted with the defence of the castle, Wilkin fortifies himself with drink.

Ch. 4: Raymond is killed in the battle.

Ch. 5: Wilkin and Father Aldrovand prepare to defend the castle. Wilkin pretends to bargain with Iorworth, Guenwyn's messenger, for its surrender.

Ch. 6: Eveline vows to the Virgin to give her hand to any knight who delivers the castle. Rose defends her father against Aldrovand's accusation of treachery.

Ch. 7: Wilkin explains his ruse to Aldrovand and sends Ioworth packing, having received provisions by his deception.

Ch. 8: Eveline prepares for the attack. The Welsh are repelled on their first assault.

Ch. 9: The Constable of Chester, Sir Hugo de Lacy, arrives and routs the Welsh. His nephew Damian enters the castle.

Ch. 10: Damian tells Eveline that Guenwyn has been killed. During Raymond's funeral obsequies Dame Gillian talks to a visiting merchant [Randal de Lacy in disguise] about her mistress's prospects, indicating that young Damian is generally considered a more appropriate match than Sir Hugo.

Ch. 11: Damian arranges for Eveline to meet his father in a splendid pavilion, where Sir Hugo seeks her hand. She asks for time to consider his request, intending to seek the advice of her aunt, the Benedictine Abbess at Gloucester.

Ch. 12: Rose urges Eveline not to accept Sir Hugo.

Ch. 13: Sir Hugo escorts Eveline on her journey to Gloucester. On the way she accepts an invitation to stay overnight at Baldringham, the house of her grandmother's sister Ermingarde, who had disapproved as a Saxon of her (Ermingarde's) sister's marriage into a Norman house.

Ch. 14: After dinner at Baldringham, Eveline is subjected to the traditional ordeal of the Red Finger.

Ch. 15: Next morning Eveline leaves Baldringham, with Ermingarde uttering dire predictions. On the road she tells Rose about the ordeal: the red-fingered ghost of the Druid Vanda murdered by her Baldringham husband had pronounced the words: 'Widow'd wife and married maid,/ Betroth'd, betrayer, and betray'd!' Eveline is impressed with Sir Hugo's good sense and his way of expressing it.

Ch. 16: Protracted negotiations take place at Gloucester to prepare for the betrothal of Eveline and Sir Hugo. Randal de Lacy introduces himself to Eveline and asks her to arrange for him to be invited to the betrothal ceremony: Sir Hugo reluctantly agrees.

Volume Two

Ch. 1 (17): Damian arrives for the betrothal, but turns out to be seriously unwell. Archbishop Baldwin's officer arrives to summon Sir Hugo to meet him. Sir Hugo declines Randal's offer to be of service to him.

Ch. 2 (18): Sir Hugo cannot bear to enter Damian's sickroom. The archbishop persuades the Constable not to delay his crusading expedition for his marriage. A minstrel in fantastic clothes [Renault Vidal, Cadwallon (Guenwyn's bard) in disguise] arrives with news that Damian is recovering.

Ch. 3 (19): After an initial refusal, Sir Hugo agrees that Vidal should accompany him to the Holy Land. The abbess persuades Sir Hugo to allow Eveline to break off their engagement, but she declines to do so and decides to leave the Gloucester convent for the Garde Douloureuse.

Ch. 4 (20): Vidal sings disturbingly to Sir Hugo and is dismissed to his own quarters by the vigilant squire Guarine.

Ch. 5 (21): Wilkin persuades Sir Hugo that Damian, rather than he (Wilkin), should be in charge of the Garde Douloureuse while the Constable is abroad.

Ch. 6 (22): Eveline finds life at the castle tedious for nearly three years: she has only formal contact with Damian.

Ch. 7 (23): While on a hawking expedition, Eveline is captured by a band of Welshmen.

Ch. 8 (24): Imprisoned beneath a giant cauldron [Edinburgh Edition: in other editions, in a cairn tomb] Eveline is assailed by magnified sounds of conflict. When they die away she is able to communicate with the wounded Damian: the return of the victorious party led by Wilkin leads to her release and she tends the young man's wounds.

Ch. 9 (25): The narrator explains the mechanics of the rescue.

Ch. 10 (26): Eveline takes Damian to the castle, rejecting Rose's proposal that Wilkie offer him accommodation to avoid any suggestion of impropriety.

Ch. 11 (27): Eveline finds Damian in mental distress, and his page Amelot explains that a band of rebels against the nobles claim that the young man favours their insurrection. Eveline insists that her soldiers follow Amelot to carry out Damian's mission to rescue his kinsman Wild Wenlock. As the party arrive at the village the defenders surrender, and Wenlock's head is brought to Amelot in the mistaken belief that Damian would approve of his execution.

Ch. 12 (28): Eveline consoles Damian, and rejects Rose's conjecture that Sir Hugo may not return. She refuses admission to Guy de Monthermer when he arrives to arrest Damian in the King's name.

Ch. 13 (29): Three months later Sir Hugo and Guarine, returning from the Holy Land in disguise, disagree about Vidal's loyalty. Vidal arrives with distorted news from the castle, now in the King's hands, implying that Eveline and Damian have become lovers and rebelled against their sovereign.

Ch. 14 (30): Sir Hugo spurns Vidal's gesture of admiration at his mental fortitude under stress. Gillian and Raoul arrive with more accurate news: they tell of the innocence of the young couple, and of the villainy of Randal, who was behind the capture of Eveline in Ch. 23, and who has informed the King that Sir Hugo is dead.

Ch. 15 (31): As Randal leaves the castle to deliver a royal charter to the Flemings in his capacity as the new Constable, Vidal kills him, believing him to be Sir Hugo from whom he has been finally alienated by his spurning in the previous chapter. He reveals himself as Cadwallon and is executed at the King's command.

Conclusion: Confined in her aunt's convent, Eveline receives news from Rose of Sir Hugo's return and Damian's restoration to royal favour. In retrospective narrative, Damian is tested in his confinement by Sir Hugo disguised as a palmer, and proves his integrity. Sir Hugo relinquishes his claim to Eveline in favour of his nephew.

== Reception ==
The reviewers generally found The Betrothed inferior to The Talisman, and their articles tend to concentrate on the latter, but more than half of them were decidedly favourable to the former, and only four highly critical. The most frequent objections were directed with varying degrees of force at a tendency to heaviness and dullness. The Introduction had more critics than admirers. Among the characters, Wilkin Flammock and his daughter Rose were often singled out for high praise.
