= Tales of the Crusaders =

Series of novels by Sir Walter Scott

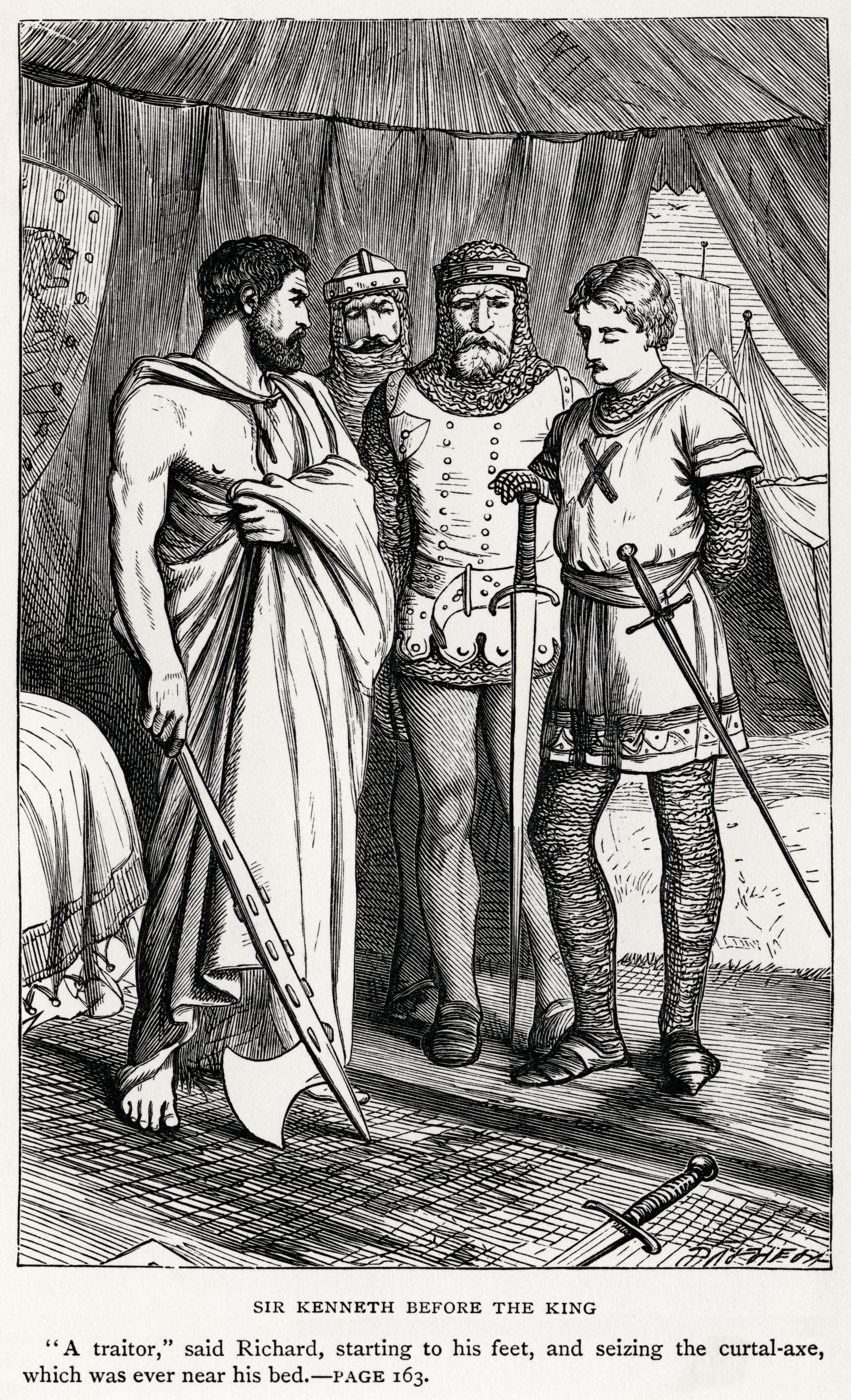
A scene from The Talisman with engraving by the Dalziel Brothers

Tales of the Crusaders is a series of two historical novels by Sir Walter Scott released in 1825: The Betrothed and The Talisman. Set at the time of the Crusades, Tales of the Crusaders is a subset series which forms part of Scott's multi-novel series known as the Waverley Novels released from 1814 to 1832.
