= Redgauntlet =

1824 novel by Walter Scott

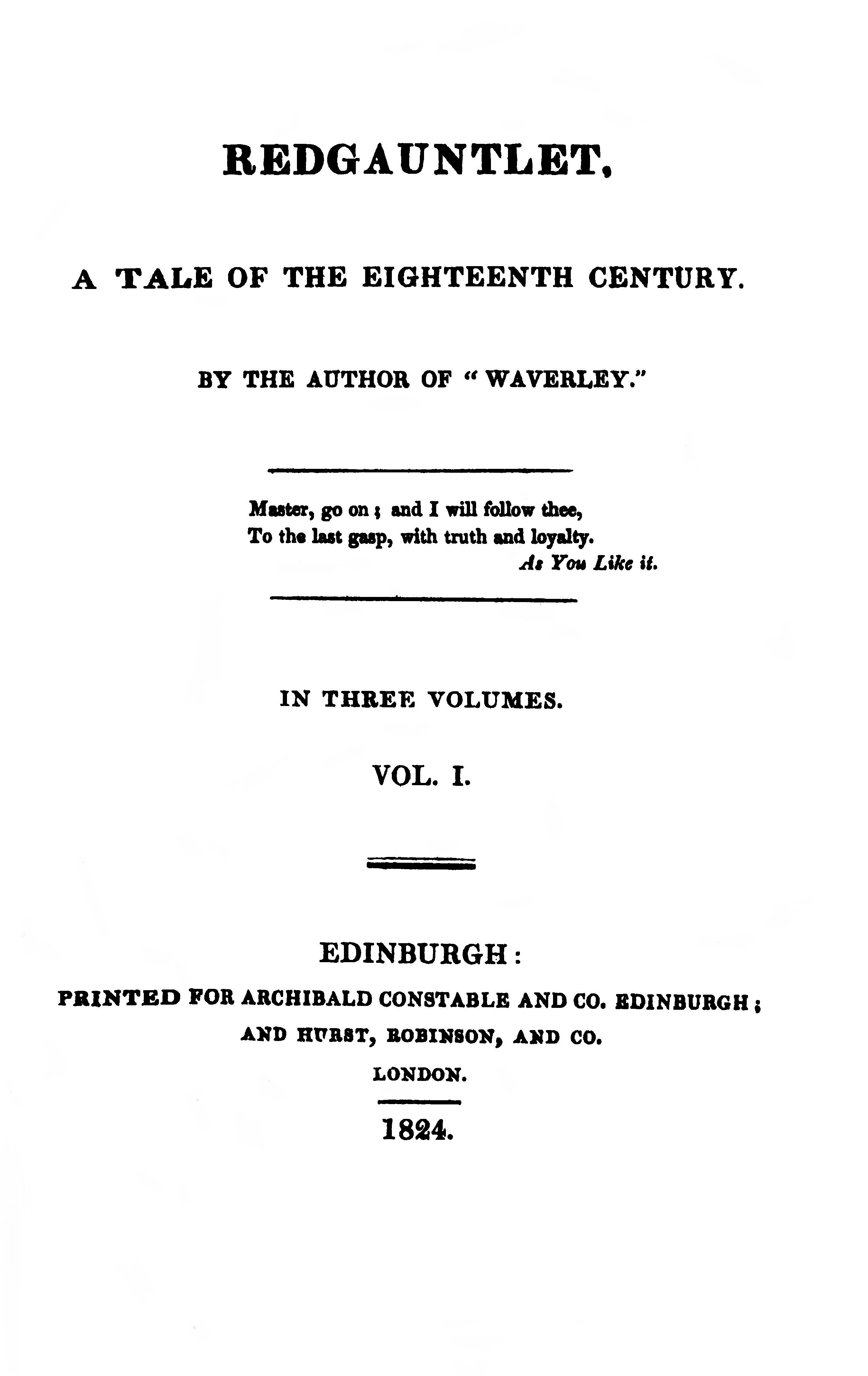
- Author: Sir Walter Scott
- Language: English and Scots
- Series: Waverley Novels
- Genre: Historical novel
- Publisher: Archibald Constable and Co. (Edinburgh); Hurst, Robinson, and Co. (London)
- Publication date: 1824
- Publication place: Scotland
- Media type: Print
- Pages: 380 (Edinburgh Edition, 1997
- Preceded by: Saint Ronan's Well
- Followed by: The Betrothed

Redgauntlet is an 1824 historical novel by Sir Walter Scott, one of the Waverley novels, set primarily in Dumfriesshire, southwest Scotland, in 1765, and described by Magnus Magnusson (a point first made by Andrew Lang) as "in a sense, the most autobiographical of Scott's novels." It describes a plot to start a fictional third Jacobite Rebellion, and includes "Wandering Willie's Tale", a famous short story which frequently appears in anthologies.

== Composition ==
Composition of Redgauntlet was swift and steady. It began very shortly after the completion of Saint Ronan's Well in early December 1823, and by early January 1824 proofs had reached the fourth letter. The first volume was in print before the end of March, the second was probably written in late March and April, and the third was certainly composed in May.

== Editions ==
The first edition was published in Edinburgh by Archibald Constable and Co. on 14 June 1824 and in London by Hurst, Robinson, and Co. on the 29th of the same month. As with all the Waverley novels before 1827 publication was anonymous. The print run was 10,000 and the price one and a half guineas (£1 11s 6d or £1.57½). It is likely that Scott was responsible for at least some of the small changes to the text of the novel when it appeared in the 1827 Tales and Romances (his involvement being with the octavo and 18mo formats rather than the intervening duodecimo). During January and February 1831 he revised the text more extensively and provided an introduction and notes for the 'Magnum' edition, in which it appeared as Volumes 35 and 36 in April and May 1832.

The standard modern edition, by G. A. M. Wood with David Hewitt, was published as Volume 17 of the Edinburgh Edition of the Waverley Novels in 1997: this is based on the first edition with emendations mainly from the manuscript; the 'Magnum' material appears in Volume 25b (2012).

== Plot introduction ==
The novel's hero is a young man named Darsie Latimer. Early in the novel he is kidnapped by Hugh Redgauntlet, and taken to a village in Dumfriesshire. Darsie's friend Alan Fairford sets out to rescue him. After much intrigue Darsie discovers that Redgauntlet is his uncle, and he is also reunited with his sister. He is taken to a village in Cumberland and discovers that a number of prominent Jacobites, and Prince Charles Edward Stuart (Bonnie Prince Charlie or the Young Pretender) himself are also there. Redgauntlet has summoned them all to start a new Jacobite rebellion, and he wants Darsie to join them. However, Redgauntlet discovers that his fellow Jacobites are not as committed as he, and their stated objection is that they suspect the Prince's mistress, Clementina Walkinshaw, of being a spy. During these discussions, General Campbell arrives amongst them to announce that he and the government know what the conspirators are up to. The Prince is allowed to go into exile, and his followers peacefully disperse. Redgauntlet, seeing that the Jacobite cause is now lost, joins the Prince in exile. Darsie is set free having always remained loyal to the current king, and Alan marries Darsie's sister.

== Plot summary ==
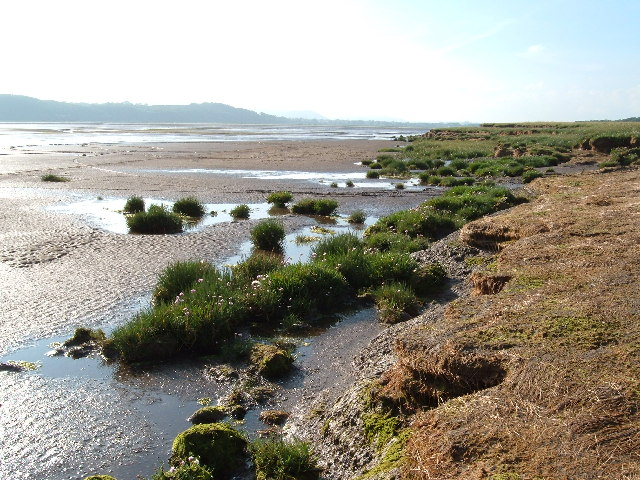
Caerlaverock, near Dumfries

Darsie had been Alan Fairford's favourite schoolfellow, and, to please his son, Mr Fairford had consented that Darsie, who received an ample allowance on the understanding that he was to make no inquiries respecting his family until he completed his twenty-fifth year, should live with them. Alan was studying for the law, but his companion had started for his first country ramble, and the story commences with a long correspondence between them. As he returned from fishing in the Solway Firth, with Benjie as his instructor, Darsie was overtaken by the tide, and carried by Mr Herries, dressed as a fisherman, on horseback to a cottage, where his niece Lilias said grace at supper-time; and next morning he was placed under the guidance of Joshua Geddes. The Quaker, who was part owner of some fishing nets in the river, invited him to spend a few days at his house; and while there he heard from Alan that a young lady had called to warn him that his friend was in considerable danger, and to urge that he should at once return to Edinburgh. A letter, however, from old Mr Fairford determined him not to do so; and having made acquaintance with the blind fiddler, who told him a tale of the Redgauntlet family, Darsie went with him to a fishers' merry-making, where he danced with Lilias, who reproached him for leading an idle life, and begged him to leave the neighbourhood.

Mr Fairford had arranged that Peter Peebles, an eccentric plaintiff, should be his son's first client, and Alan was pleading the cause before the Lords Ordinary when his father, by mistake, handed him a letter from Mr Crosbie, announcing that Darsie had mysteriously disappeared. Alan instantly rushed out of court, and started in search of his friend, who had accompanied the Quaker to await an attack on his fishing station, and been made prisoner by the rioters, of whom Mr Herries was the leader. After being nearly drowned, and recovering from a fever, he awoke in a strange room, to which he was confined for several days, when he was visited by his captor, and conducted by him to an interview with Squire Foxley, who, acting as a magistrate, declined to interfere with Mr Herries' guardianship. As the squire was leaving, however, Mr Peebles arrived to apply for a warrant against Alan for throwing up his brief, and startled Mr Herries by recognising him as a Redgauntlet and an unpardoned Jacobite. Darsie obtained a partial explanation from him, and was told to prepare for a journey disguised as a woman. Meanwhile, Alan had applied to the provost, and, having obtained from his wife's relation, Mr Maxwell, a letter to Herries, he started for Annan, where, under the guidance of Trumbull, he took ship for Cumberland. On landing at Crakenthorp's inn, he was transported by Nanty Ewart, and a gang of smugglers, to Fair-ladies' House, where he was nursed through a fever, and introduced to a mysterious Father Buonaventure. After being closely questioned and detained for a few days, he was allowed to return with a guide to the inn.

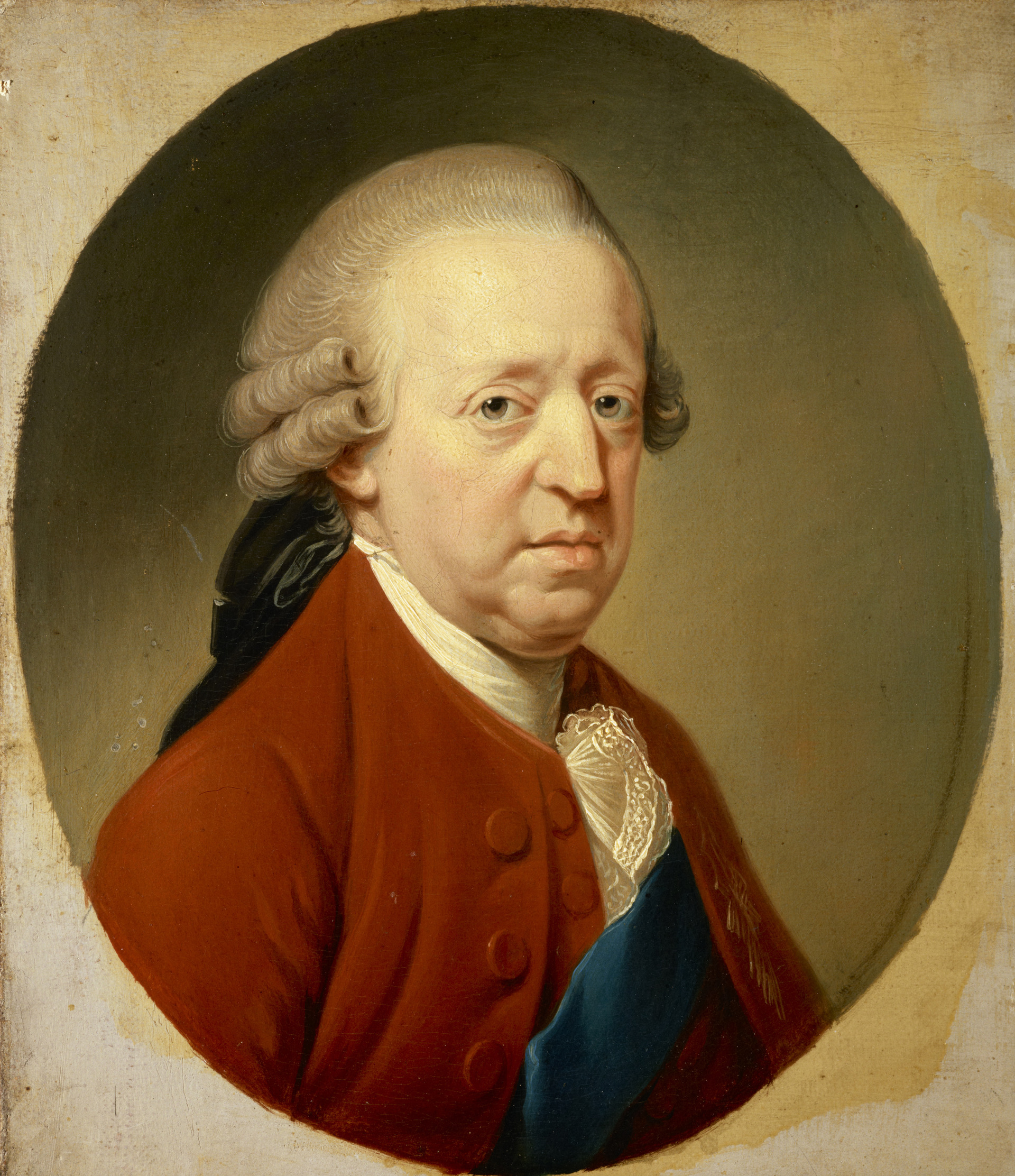
Charles Edward Stuart in 1775

Darsie was also travelling thither with Herries and his followers, when he discovered that Lilias, who accompanied them, was his sister, and learnt from her his own real name and rank. He was also urged by his uncle to join a rising in favour of the Pretender; and, having hesitated to do so, was detained in custody when they reached their destination, where Alan, as well as other visitors and several of the neighbouring gentry, had already arrived. He was then introduced to a conference of Charles Edward Stuart's adherents, and afterwards to the prince himself, who refused to agree to their conditions, and decided to abandon the contemplated attempt in his favour. Ewart was, accordingly, ordered to have his brig in readiness, when Nixon suggested that he should turn traitor, upon which they fought and killed each other. Sir Arthur now learned that Fairford and Geddes were in the house; but, before he was allowed to see them, they had been shown into the room where Lilias was waiting, when Alan became aware that his fair visitor at Edinburgh was his friend's sister, and heard from her lips all the particulars of her brother's history. Their conversation was interrupted by the entrance of Benjie, in whose pocket a paper was found indicating that Nixon had communicated with the Government. During the confusion which ensued, General Campbell, a former military acquaintance of Herries, appeared, unarmed and unaccompanied, and after explaining that the Jacobites had been betrayed weeks before, announced that he was sufficiently supported with cavalry and infantry. The Rebellion was over before it could begin. His instructions, however, from King George were to allow all concerned in the plot to disperse, and he intimated that as many as wished might embark in the vessel which was in waiting.

The Pretender was, accordingly, led by the Laird of Redgauntlet to the beach, and Lilias offered to accompany her uncle in his voluntary exile. This, however, he would not permit, and, after an exchange of courtesies with the general, the prince departed amidst the tears and sobs of the last supporters of his cause, and henceforward the term Jacobite ceased to be a party name. Lilias, of course, married Alan, and Herries, who had asked his nephew's pardon for attempting to make a rebel of him, threw away his sword, and became the prior of a monastery.

== Characters ==
Principal characters in bold

- **Darsie Latimer**, afterwards Sir Arthur Darsie Redgauntlet
- Saunders Fairford, a Writer to the Signet
- **Alan Fairford**, his son, an advocate
- **Herries of Birrenswork**, the assumed name of **Sir Hugh Redgauntlet**
- Lilias, his niece
- Cristal Nixon and Mabel Moffat, their servants
- Jack Hadaway, a village lad
- Benjie, a village lad
- **Joshua Geddes**, of Mount Sharon, a Quaker
- Rachel Geddes, his sister
- Willie Steenson, a blind fiddler
- **Peter Peebles**, Alan's first client
- William Crosbie, Provost of Dumfries
- Squire Foxley, of Foxley Hall, Cumberland
- Nicholas Faggot, his clerk
- Peter Maxwell, of Summertrees, alias Pate-in-Peril
- Tom Trumbull, of Annan, a contraband trader
- Job Rutledge, a fellow smuggler
- **Nanty Ewart**, captain of the Jumping Jenny
- Father Crackenthorp, a Cumberland innkeeper and smuggler
- The Sisters Arthuret, of Fairladies' House
- **Father Buonaventure**, afterwards **The Young Pretender**
- General Colin Campbell, a Hanoverian officer

== Chapter summary ==
Volume One

Letter 1: Darsie Latimer to Alan Fairford: Beginning his journey in Dumfries, Darsie writes to Alan back in Edinburgh lamenting his sense of loneliness as an orphan.

Letter 2: Alan Fairford to Darsie Latimer: Alan expresses his uneasy relationship with his severe father and advises Darsie to restrain his over-active imagination.

Letter 3: Darsie Latimer to Alan Fairford: Darsie rejects most of Alan's criticisms. He is tantalised by the closeness of England, which he is prohibited from visiting.

Letter 4: The Same to the Same: Darsie tells how a formidable horseman (Redgauntlet) rescued him from the advancing Solway tide and afforded him overnight accommodation.

Letter 5: Alan Fairford to Darsie Latimer: Alan rejects Darsie's view of events as coloured. He tells how his strictly Presbyterian father had an awkward meal with the Jacobite Herries of Birrenswork (Redgauntlet).

Letter 6: Darsie Latimer to Alan Fairford: Darsie tells how Herries disagreed with the Quaker Joshua Geddes over fishing rights. Joshua escorted him to Mount Sharon, discussing the issue on the way.

Letter 7: The Same to the Same: Darsie tells how little Benjie's mistreatment of Joshua's horse Solomon pained the Quaker. After breakfast he accepted an invitation to stay for a while at Mount Sharon, and Rachel Geddes gave him a conducted tour with information about the fishing dispute.

Letter 8: Alan Fairford to Darsie Latimer: Alan tells how he has received a strange visit from a young lady, followed by a letter signed 'Green Mantle' warning that Darsie is in danger. Alan urges him to return to Edinburgh.

Letter 9: Alexander Fairford, W.S., to Mr. Darsie Latimer: Alan's father advises Darsie to remain where he is till he (Darsie) sees Herries, who is acquainted with his affairs.

Letter 10, Darsie Latimer to Alan Fairford: Darsie indicates he will continue at Mount Sharon in the meantime. He tells how he encountered the fiddler Willie Steenson.

Letter 11, The Same to the Same: Darsie transmits Wandering Willie's tale of the uncanny involvement of his father Steenie Steenson with the Redgauntlet family.

Letter 12, The Same to the Same: Darsie tells how he slipped away during a dance at a cottage after being warned by Greenmantle.

Letter 13, Alan Fairford to Darsie Latimer: Alan tells Darsie that he has been given as his first legal case the long-running affair of Peter Peebles.

Volume Two

Ch. 1: Narrative: Alan prepares for the Peebles case, but he suddenly leaves the court in mid-pleading on being handed a paper by his father.

Ch. 2: Narrative continued: The paper mistakenly handed to Alan is a letter to his father from Provost Crosbie of Dumfries intimating that Darsie has not been heard of since an attack on Joshua's net. Returning home from the court, Alan's father finds a letter from his son indicating that he has left for Dumfries.

Ch. 3, Journal of Darsie Latimer: [The journal takes up the narrative retrospectively] Darsie accompanies Joshua to the fishing station where there is a calm before the expected attack.

Ch. 4, Darsie Latimer's Journal, in continuation: Darsie is injured during the attack and conducted across the Solway by Cristal Nixon.

Ch. 5, Darsie Latimer's Journal, in continuation: Recuperating in a farmhouse, Darsie gets the servant Dorcas to transmit a message to Herries asking to be taken before a magistrate, or at least for a personal interview. He receives an accommodating reply.

Ch. 6, Darsie Latimer's Journal, in continuation: Darsie is taken before Justice Foxley and links Herries's distinctive facial expression with a memory from his infancy.

Ch. 7, Darsie Latimer's Journal, in continuation: Peter Peebles arrives in search of a warrant for Alan's apprehension. Herries destroys a warrant issued for his own arrest.

Ch. 8, Darsie Latimer's Journal, in continuation: Darsie spurns Herries's Jacobite advances.

Ch. 9, Darsie Latimer's Journal, in continuation: Darsie is encouraged by Willie in an exchange of fragments of songs, and by Greenmantle with two written stanzas. A lady's costume complete with mask arrives for him to wear on horseback.

Ch. 10, Narrative of Alan Fairford: Provost Crosbie agrees to introduce Alan to Pate Maxwell as a likely source of information. Alan visits Mount Sharon, where Rachel indicates that her father has left for Cumberland to help Darsie.

Ch. 11, Narrative of Alan Fairford, continued: Pate tells Alan the story of his association with Darsie's late father Sir Henry Redgauntlet and agrees to write to his brother Hugh.

Ch. 12, Narrative of Alan Fairford, continued: Crosbie advises Alan to read Pate's letter before delivering it. Alan arrives at Annan and is passed on by Tom Trumbull to Job Rutledge.

Ch. 13, Narrative of Alan Fairford, continued: Job transfers Alan to Nanty Ewart for the passage of the Solway by boat.

Volume Three

Ch. 1: (14) Narrative of Alan Fairford, continued: Nanty tells Alan his story.

Ch. 2, (15) Narrative of Alan Fairford, continued: On landing, Nanty greets the innkeeper Father Crackenthorpe and conveys Alan, who has a severe fever, to the Sisters Arthuret at the community of Fairladies.

Ch. 3, (16) Narrative of Alan Fairford, continued: Alan has two interviews with Father Bonaventura [the Young Pretender], who opens Pate's letter to Redgauntlet and furnishes Fairford with a letter of his own to deliver along with it requesting that Darsie be released.

Ch. 4, (17) Narrative of Darsie Latimer: Greenmantle reveals herself to Darsie as his sister Lilias.

Ch. 5, (18) Narrative of Darsie Latimer, continued: Lilias tells her story, highlighting her being directed by Redgauntlet to exchange gages at George III's coronation feast.

Ch. 6, (19) Narrative of Darsie Latimer, continued: Cristal Nixon says Darsie has little option but to go along with the Jacobite project, and Redgauntlet again urges it upon his nephew. They arrive at Crackenthorpe's, where Alan is present.

Ch. 7, (20) Narrative of Darsie Latimer, continued: Joshua and then Peter arrive. Joshua tries to restrain Nanty from attacking Peter, who turns out to have been the callous property owner who caused the death of Ewart's landlady and the ruin of her daughter.

Ch. 8, (21) Narrative of Alan Fairford: Redgauntlet uses the warrant which Justice Foxley signed at the prompting of his clerk Faggot to reinforce his control over Alan.

Ch. 9, (22) Narrative continued: Redgauntlet allows Darsie a glimpse of Alan. Charles declines to give up his mistress as his followers demand.

Ch. 10, (23) Narrative continued: Redgauntlet tells Cristal and Nanty to prepare Ewart's boat for evacuation. Cristal tries to get Nanty to betray the Prince, and in the resulting quarrel they kill each other. General Colin Campbell arrives unarmed, and by the King's order permits Redgauntlet to leave with the Prince, ending the conspiracy without fuss.

Conclusion: In a letter to the Author of Waverley, Dr. Dryasdust presents the results of his researches into the subsequent careers of the main characters.

== Reception ==
The reviewers of Redgauntlet were evenly divided into three groups: one found a welcome return to the author's best level, a second discerned virtues and defects in roughly equal measure, and a third saw no recovery from the nadir of Saint Ronan's Well. A majority found much to admire in the strong and varied characterisation: Peter Peebles, Nanty Ewart, Joshua Geddes, and Redgauntlet himself were most often singled out, along with Wandering Willie, whose tale was pronounced the high point of the narrative. Several reviewers declared themselves weary of Jacobitism as a theme, and the unusual lack of love interest was a disappointment. There were differing views on the effectiveness of the plot, but it was widely felt that the correspondents in the first volume were insufficiently differentiated, unlike those in Richardson, and the double shift from letters to journal to conventional narrative was judged unsatisfactory.

== Literary significance and criticism ==
In the introduction to the novel, Scott discussed the position of the former Jacobites:

Most Scottish readers who can count the number of sixty years, must recollect many respected acquaintances of their youth, who, as the established phrase gently worded it, out in the Forty-Five. ... Jacobites were looked on in society as men who had proved their sincerity by sacrificing their interests to their principles; and in well-regulated companies, it was held a piece of ill-breeding to injure their feelings...

Magnus Magnusson wrote:

Its two young heroes, Alan Fairford and Darsie Latimer (Redgauntlet's nephew), between them reflect the duality of Scott's own character. Fairford, an Edinburgh advocate, is the son of a strict, ultra-conservative Edinburgh lawyer; Latimer ... is the young adventurer seeking to discover the secret of his parentage in the wilds of Dumfriesshire. Alan Fairford is Scott's Edinburgh self; Darsie Latimer is his Borders self. Between them ... they discover an ultimate commitment to the Hanoverian peace.

David Daiches wrote:

The picture of the slow disintegration of the meeting, of the embarrassment of the Jacobites when faced with the problem of reconciling their fierce protestations of loyalty to the House of Stuart with the realities of their present situation, is brilliantly done. The scene is one of the finest in Scott. The two worlds are finally brought together, and the romantic one disintegrates.

The early parts of the novel are in epistolary form consisting of letters between Darsie Latimer and Alan Fairford, or between Darsie and Saunders Fairford (Alan's father). It changes to third person narration from the court case where Alan represents Peter Peebles. The remainder of the novel is mostly third person, with some extracts from the journal of Darsie Latimer.

One of the major highlights of the novel is "Wandering Willie's Tale", which occurs in the epistolary section. Wandering Willie is a wandering musician and the narrator of the tale. It is a ghost story with the climax being an encounter between Willie's grandfather, Steenie Steenson and the ghost of his landlord Robert Redgauntlet (Hugh's grandfather). All of the supernatural events have rational explanations which Willie mentions but vehemently denies.

== Adaptations ==
- A television miniseries in six episodes was shown in 1959. It starred Tom Fleming as Redgauntlet, Terry Baker as Nixon, Donald Douglas as Darsie, John Cairney as Alan, and Claire Nielson as Lilias.
- Another miniseries was shown in 1970. It starred Jack Watson as Redgauntlet, Roddy McMillan as Nixon, James Grant as Darsie, Andrew Robertson as Alan, and Isobel Black as Lilias.
- On March 19, 1982, the CBC Radio series Nightfall aired an adaptation of Wandering Willie's Tale entitled "From My Appointed Place Below", written by John Douglas.
- In 2014 BBC Radio 4 broadcast a loose adaptation as part of its The Great Scott series (three plays based on Scott's novels, with David Tennant narrating as Scott). Set in an independent Scotland in 2035, Redgauntlet (played by Forbes Masson) and allies are revolutionaries fighting for reunification of the UK.
