= Claire Lamont =

British academic (1942–2023)

Claire Lamont (29 January 1942 – 9 April 2023) was a British academic who was Emeritus Professor of English literature at Newcastle University and a specialist in the oeuvres of Jane Austen and Sir Walter Scott. She was a winner of the British Academy's Rose Mary Crawshay Prize in 1983.

== Life ==
Claire Lamont was born in London on 29 January 1942. Her maternal grandfather, Sir Edward Appleton, was the Principal of Edinburgh University (1949-65). She attended Esdaile's (The Ministers' Daughters' College) in Edinburgh, and read English at Edinburgh University. She took up a research role at Leeds University followed by a graduate studentship at St Hilda's College, Oxford, where she researched the literary papers of the Fraser Tytler family from Inverness-shire. She worked at an antiquarian bookseller in London, then became a Junior Research Fellow at Somerville College, Oxford, matriculating in 1969.

In 1971, Lamont joined Newcastle University as a lecturer in English literature.

== Academic work ==
Lamont discovered a manuscript by William Collins titled Popular Superstitions Ode in 1967.

In 1970, Lamont edited and published Jane Austen's Sense and Sensibility as part of an Oxford University series of English novels. Her introduction was well-received as elegantly written, though her traditional, correct and unexceptionable account of the novel was criticised for not addressing its true import, namely the clash between Marianne Dashwood and her social suffocation by her sister and others.

At Somerville, Lamont was supervised by Mary Lascelles. She prepared a new edition of Sir Walter Scott's Waverley, which was published in 1981. Based on Scott's first edition rather than the later Magnum Opus edition, her work, the first by a modern editor, was called a foundational edition.

The Edinburgh Edition of the Waverley Novels, work on which began in 1984 and continued until the publication in 2012 of the last two volumes in the series, was co-edited by Lamont.

== Death ==
Lamont died from complications of vascular dementia on 9 April 2023, at the age of 81.

== Honours ==
For her edition of Waverley, Lamont received the Rose Mary Crawshay Prize in 1983. She became a Fellow of the English Association of the University of Leicester in 2004. She was an Honorary Fellow of the Association for Scottish Literary Studies. In 2011–2012 she was President of the Edinburgh Sir Walter Scott Club.

== Selected publications ==
- Austen, Jane (1970). Lamont, Claire; Kinsley, James (eds.). Sense and Sensibility. Oxford University.
- Scott, Walter (1981). Lamont, Claire (ed.). Waverley; or 'Tis Sixty Years Since. Oxford University.
- Scott, Walter (2000). Lamont, Claire (ed.). Chronicles of the Canongate. Edinburgh University.
- Scott, Walter (2008). Lamont, Claire (ed.). The Heart of Midlothian. Oxford University. ISBN 9780199538393.
- Alexander, J. H.; Garside, P. D.; Lamont, Claire, eds. (2012). Walter Scott, Introductions and Notes from the Magnum Opus: Waverley to A Legend of the Wars of Montrose. The Edinburgh Edition of the Waverley Novels. Edinburgh: Edinburgh University Press. ISBN 9780748605903.
- Alexander, J. H.; Garside, P. D.; Lamont, Claire, eds. (2012). Walter Scott, Introductions and Notes from the Magnum Opus: Ivanhoe to Castle Dangerous. The Edinburgh Edition of the Waverley Novels. Edinburgh: Edinburgh University Press. ISBN 9780748614912.
