= John Balfour of Kinloch =

Scottish assassin (fl. 1663–1683)

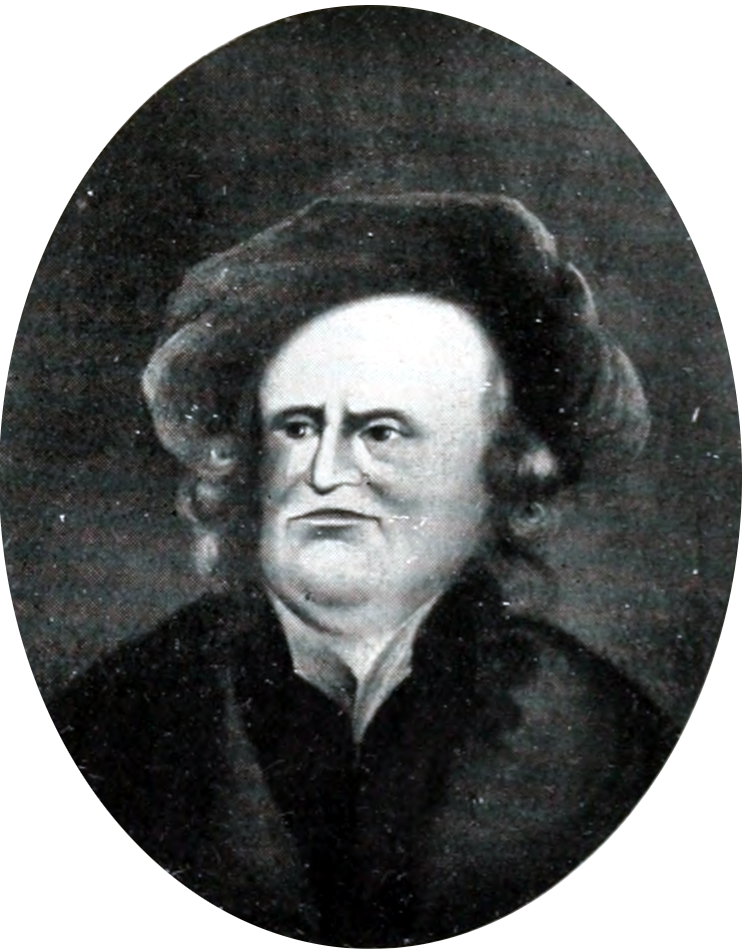
- John Balfour (fl. 1663–1683)
- Other name: Burly
- Movement: Covenanters
- Spouse: Barbara Hackston
- Criminal charges: murder
- Reward amount: 10,000 merks

Details
- Victims: James Sharp
- Date: 3 May 1679

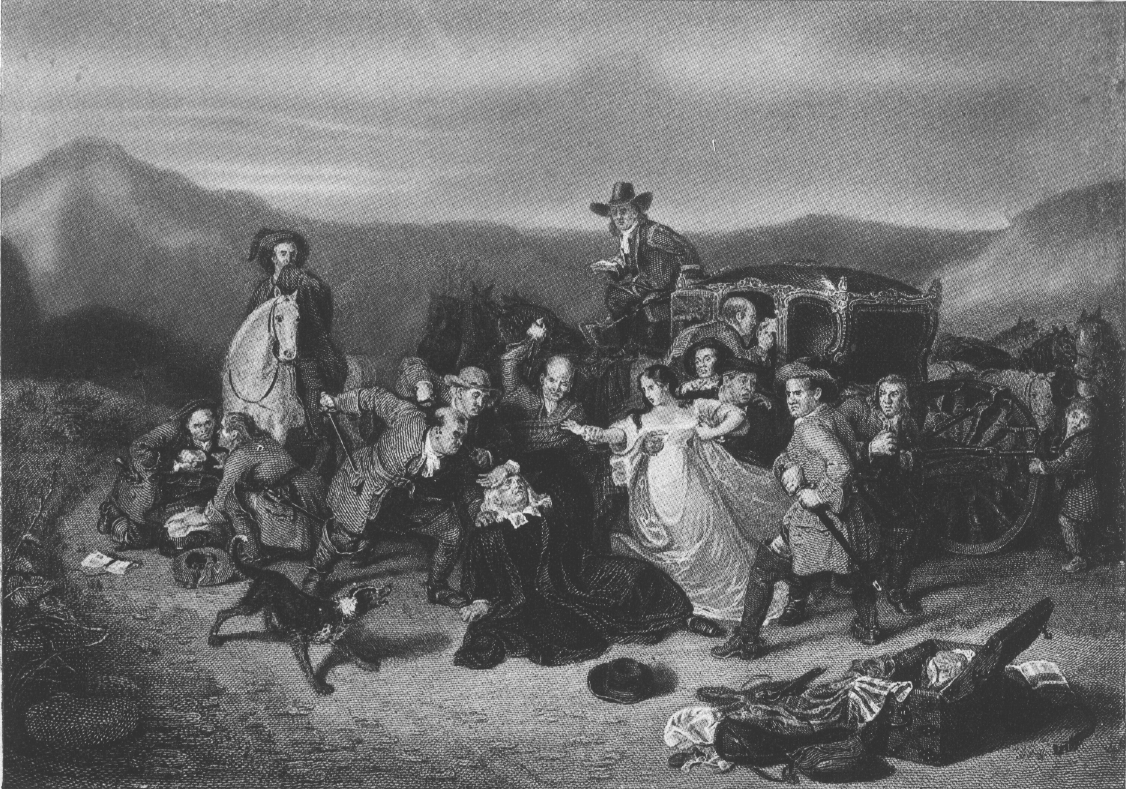
Sharp was killed whilst en route from Edinburgh to St. Andrews. Some Presbyterians regarded this as theologically defensible, regarding it as a killing rather than a murder.

John Balfour alias "Captain Burleigh"

John Balfour of Kinloch was the principal actor in the assassination of Archbishop Sharp in 1679. For this crime his estate was forfeited and a large reward offered for his capture. He fought at Drumclog and at Bothwell Bridge, and is said to have escaped to Holland, and to have there tendered his services to the Prince of Orange.

== Early life and legal problems ==
Among the hearers of the field-preachers in Fife, in the summer of 1672, was 'John Balfour, portioner in Kinloch,' in the parish of Collessie. He was reportedly a squat, squint-eyed, fierce-looking man, and was known as 'Burly'. He disobeyed the order of the court to compear and answer for conventicling, for which contempt of court he was under warrant for arrest. Balfour's brother-in-law, David Hackston, proprietor of Rathillet, in Kilmany parish, succeeded his father in 1670.' He was esteemed a gallant country gentleman, at first of the prelatic party, and having employment of some kind from Rothes.

Early in October 1667, the outlawed John Balfour of Kinloch stole home to meet his friend and neighbour, Alexander Hamilton of Kinkel, Robert Hamilton, son of Sir Thomas Hamilton of Preston, and other conventiclers. Captain Carstairs and a dozen troopers rode up to capture the meeting. A boisterous Irish soldier, called Garret, took a trial shot, to which the defenders replied by a volley which brought down Garret and put his comrades to flight.

== Account of Sharp's killing ==
In 1678, Sharp's faction regained control and supported by the government, stepped up actions against non-conformists; 3,000 Lowland militia and 6,000 Highlanders, known as the "Highland Host", were billeted in the Covenanting shires, as a form of punishment. James Mitchell, who had been arrested in 1673, was executed in 1678, making him a Presbyterian folk hero; Sharp gave evidence at his trial and was accused of perjury.

On 3 May 1679, a group of nine Covenanters, led by David Hackston and his brother-in-law, John Balfour of Kinloch, were waiting at Magus Muir, hoping to ambush the Sheriff of Cupar. A Sharp appointee, the Sheriff was prominent in persecuting Covenanters but apparently heard about the proposed ambush and stayed home.

Learning Sharp's coach was on the road, they intercepted it instead; Sharp was stabbed several times, in front of his daughter Isabella, before being killed by a shot to the chest. One of the group, James Russell, claimed he told Sharp he "...declared before the Lord that it was no particular interest, nor yet for any wrong that he had done to him, but because he had betrayed the church as Judas, and had wrung his hands, these 18 or 19 years in the blood of the saints, but especially at Pentland..." Two of the nine, Hackston and Andrew Guillan, were eventually captured and executed; a third, William Dingwall, died at the Battle of Drumclog a month later. The other six were never tried; Balfour escaped to Holland with George Fleming, but disappears from the records thereafter.

== Death ==
It is generally supposed that John Balfour of Burley died at sea on a return voyage to Scotland. But in the New Statistical Account of Scotland, under "Roseneath", strong presumptions are stated for believing that he never left Scotland, but found an asylum in the parish of Roseneath, Dunbartonshire, under the wing of the Argyll family. According to this account, having assumed the name of Salter, his descendants continued there for many generations, the last of the family dying in 1815. Scott noted in his Old Mortality that in 1808 a Lieutenant-Colonel Balfour de Burleigh was commandant of the troops of the King of Holland in the West Indies. Hewison says: "Among the exiles who perished abroad was John Balfour of Kinloch, said to have been drowned on his return from Holland. But accounts differ as to the fate of this fugitive, and nothing certain is known of his last deeds and days."

== Family ==
John Balfour of Kinloch, was the son of John Balfour and Grizzel Hay, daughter of Hay of Paris, Perthshire, born c. 1640. John served heir to his grandfather Robert, 26 February 1663. John Balfour of Kinloch married Barbara Hackston, sister of David Hackston of Rathillet. His confiscated property went to Lord Lindores: Scot. Mag., i. 130 (September 1817)

== Walter Scott's character ==
Another man Lord Balfour of Burleigh has been traditionally styled "Covenanter", which he assuredly never was. On Sir Walter Scott must be laid the blame — if blame it be — by having appropriated the name and designation in his "John Balfour of Burley" in Old Mortality.

== Attribution ==
- Anderson, William (1877). "Balfour". The Scottish nation: or, The surnames, families, literature, honours, and biographical history of the people of Scotland. Vol. 1. A. Fullarton & co. pp. 211.
- Grosart, Alexander Balloch (1885). "Balfour, John" . In Stephen, Leslie (ed.). Dictionary of National Biography. Vol. 3. London: Smith, Elder & Co. p. 55.
- Hewison, James King (1913). The Covenanters. Vol. 2. Glasgow: John Smith and son. pp. 252 et passim.
- Howie, John (1870). "John Balfour of Kinloch". In Carslaw, W. H. (ed.). The Scots worthies. Edinburgh: Oliphant, Anderson, & Ferrier. pp. 622–623.
- M'Crie, Thomas (1846). Sketches of Scottish church history : embracing the period from the Reformation to the Revolution. Vol. 2. Edinburgh: J. Johnstone. p. 157.
- Thomson, J. H. (1903). Hutchison, Matthew (ed.). The martyr graves of Scotland. Edinburgh: Oliphant, Anderson & Ferrier. p. 188 et passim.
