= David Hackston =

Scottish Presbyterian landowner and soldier (d.1680)

David Hackston or Halkerstone
- Born: Rathillet, in the parish of Kilmany, Fife
- Died: 30 July 1680 (executed); Mercat Cross, Edinburgh [Body dispersed around Scotland and head fixed on a pole at Netherbow, Edinburgh]
- Military career
- Allegiance: Scottish Covenanter
- Conflicts: Battle of Drumclog, Battle of Bothwell Bridge

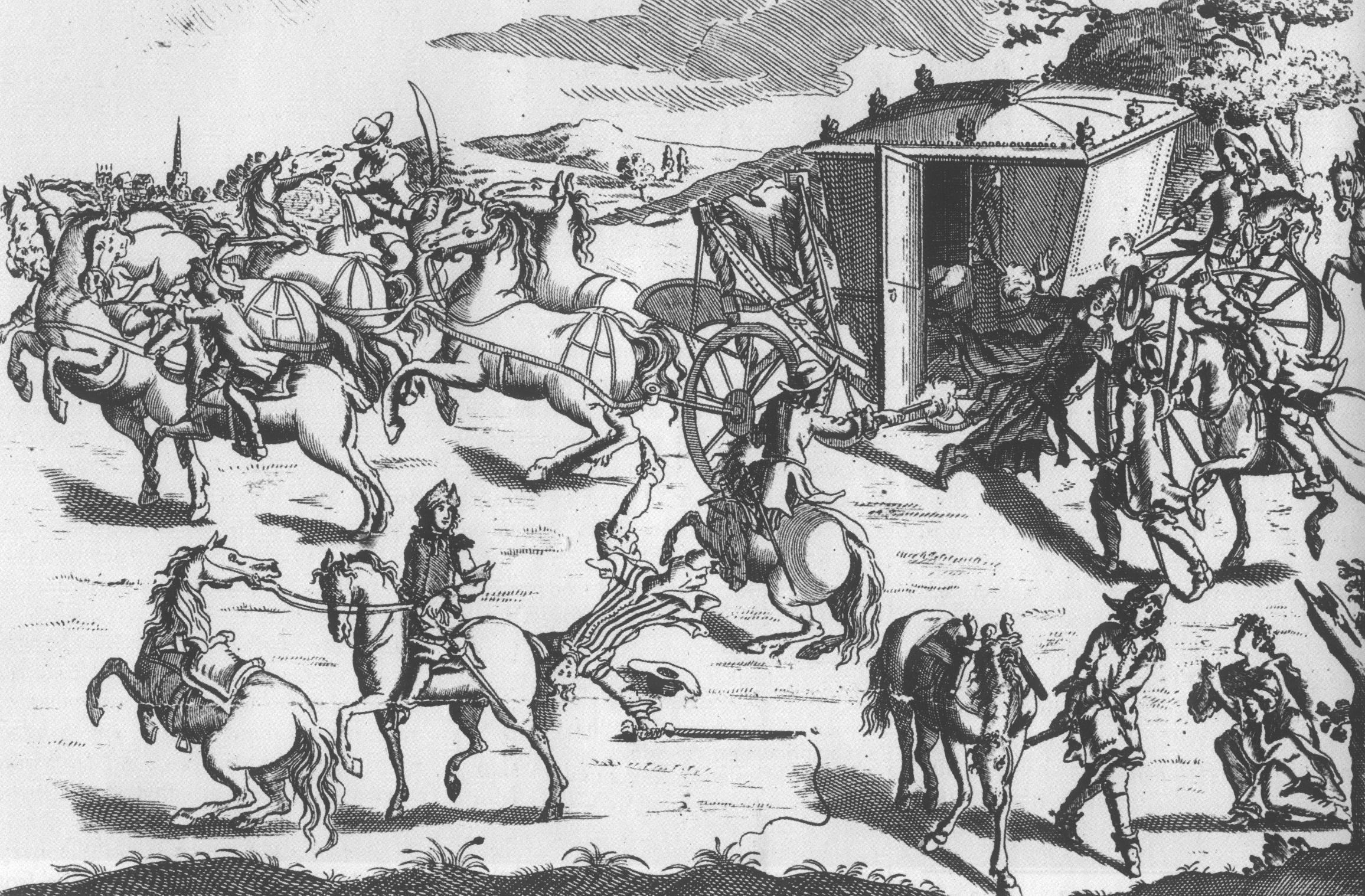
The murder of Archbishop Sharp in 1679. The mounted figure, lower left, may be intended to portray Hackston. Sharp's daughter pleads for her father's life, lower right.

David Hackston or Halkerstone (died 30 July 1680), was a militant Scottish Covenanter, remembered mainly for his part in the murder of Archbishop James Sharp of St. Andrews in 1679 and his involvement in the events of 1680 which led to his capture and execution.

== Biography ==
Hackston belonged to a well-connected landowning family, the Hackstons or Halkerstones of Rathillet, in the parish of Kilmany, Fifeshire. He was the eldest son of James Hackston and Margaret, daughter of James Falconer of Craigfoodie, and inherited his father's estate in 1670. According to a parish minister writing in 1845, "It is not known whether he was born at the family seat. The records of the kirk-session do not go back so far". There is no indication that he was religious in his youth, but attendance at a 'field preaching' led him to cast in his lot with the Covenanters, becoming one of their most trusted leaders.

In 1679, he was asked to lead the party which had resolved to assassinate Archbishop Sharp, but declined "upon account of a difference subsisting betwixt Sharp and him in a civil process, wherein he judged himself to have been wronged by the primate, which deed he thought would give the world ground to think it was rather out of personal pique and revenge, which he professed he was free of". He agreed, however, to stand by the others and take the consequences. Accordingly, he sat at some distance from the action, while other members of the group, led by John Balfour of Kinloch, despatched Sharp on 3 May 1679.

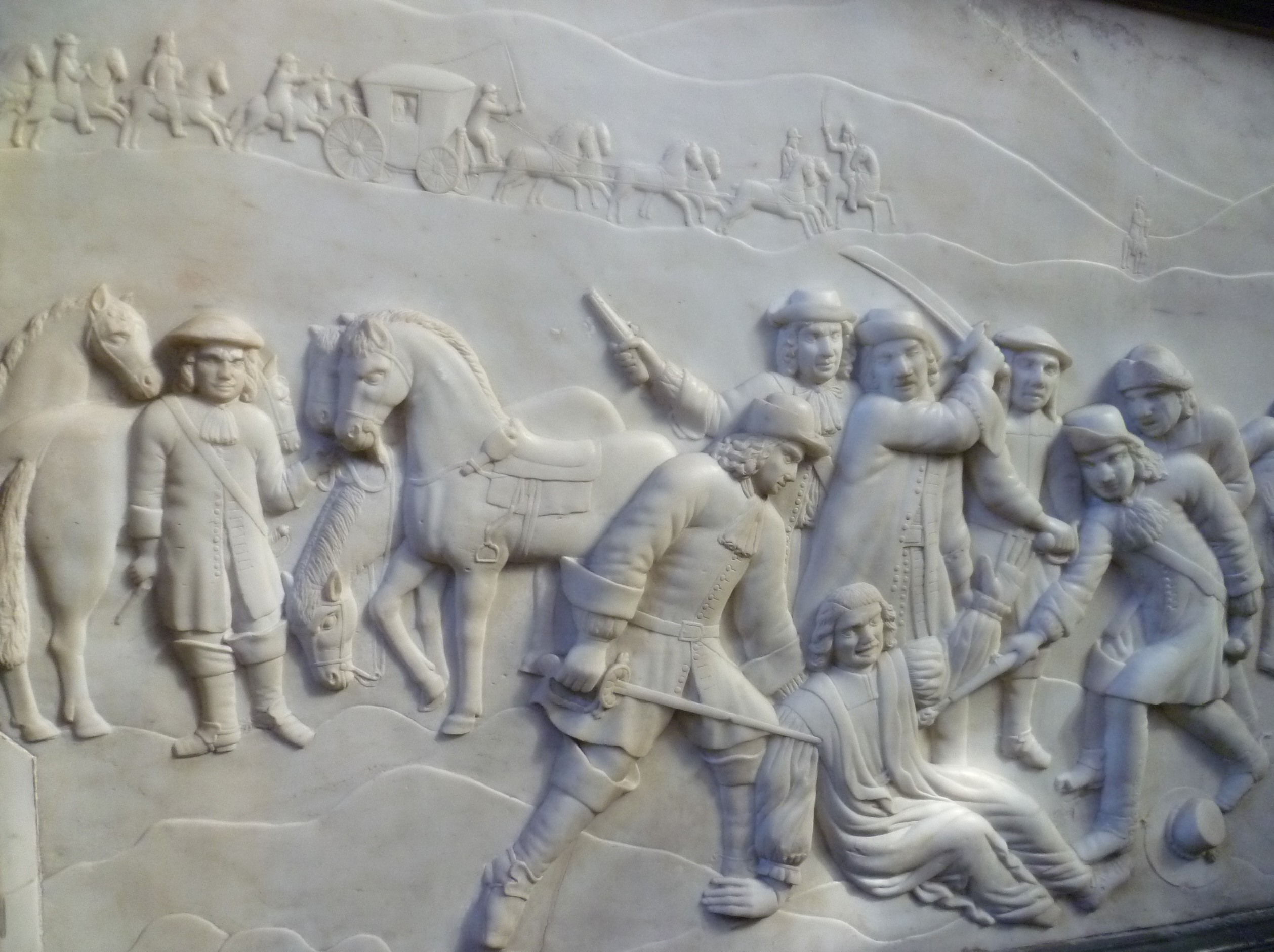
Hackston (left) portrayed on the Archbishop Sharp Memorial in St. Andrews

One of the group, James Russell, later stated that one of Sharp's servants, "came to Rathillet, who was standing at a distance with his cloak about his mouth all the time on horseback, and desired him to come and cause save his life, who answered, as he meddled not with them nor desired them to take his life, so he durst not plead for him nor forbid them".

After the murder Hackston fled into the west country and took part in drawing up and publishing The Declaration and Testimony of the true Presbyterian Party in Scotland, which condemned the government's actions in religious affairs since the Restoration. On 29 May 1679, on the day chosen to celebrate the anniversary of the King's return to the throne, a party of Covenanters, Hackston among them, rode into Rutherglen, extinguished the bonfire in the main street and read the Declaration publicly before affixing it to the mercat cross. A new fire was then lit and Acts of Parliament and the Privy Council passed against the Covenanters since 1660 were consigned to the flames.

Hackston was also one of the commanders of the Covenanters who fought at the battle of Drumclog on 1 June, and again at Bothwell Bridge on 22 June 1679, where he was credited with heroically defending the bridge for up to an hour against superior forces led by the Duke of Monmouth. Having escaped from the battlefield, a reward of 10,000 merks was offered for his apprehension, obliging him to stay in hiding.

In July 1680, he reappeared as one of the armed followers who accompanied Richard Cameron at the issuing of the Sanquhar Declaration. At length, on 22 July 1680, he and about 60 of Cameron's followers were surprised by a body of dragoons at Airds Moss in Ayrshire. A skirmish ensued in which the Covenanters were worsted, and Hackston, apparently in the capacity of commander-in-chief and badly wounded, was taken prisoner and escorted to Edinburgh. The Privy Council instructed that:

The magistrates of Edinburgh are appointed, as soon as the body of David Hackston of Rathillet is brought to the Water Gate, to receive him, and mount him on a bare-backed horse, with his face to the horse's tail, and his feet tied beneath his belly, and his hands flightered with ropes; and the executioner, with head covered, and his coat, lead his horse up the street to the Tolbooth, the said Hackston being bareheaded; that the three other prisoners be conveyed on foot, bareheaded, after him, with their hands tied to a goad of iron; ordain the said executioner to carry the head of Cameron on a halbert, from the Water Gate to the Council House.

— Privy Council.

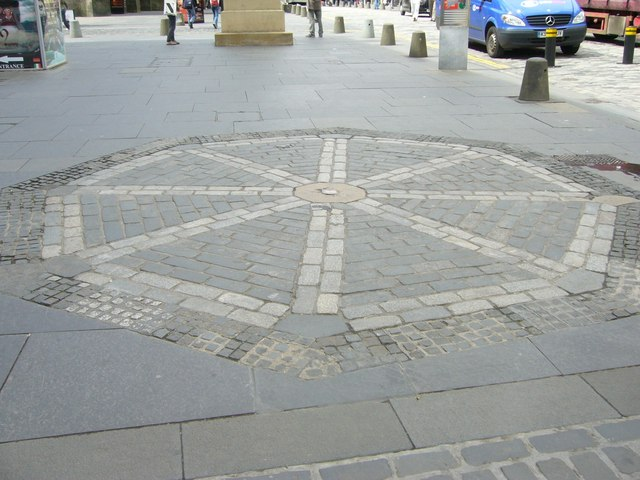
The site of Edinburgh's Mercat Cross (from 1617 to 1756) and the place of Hackston's execution.

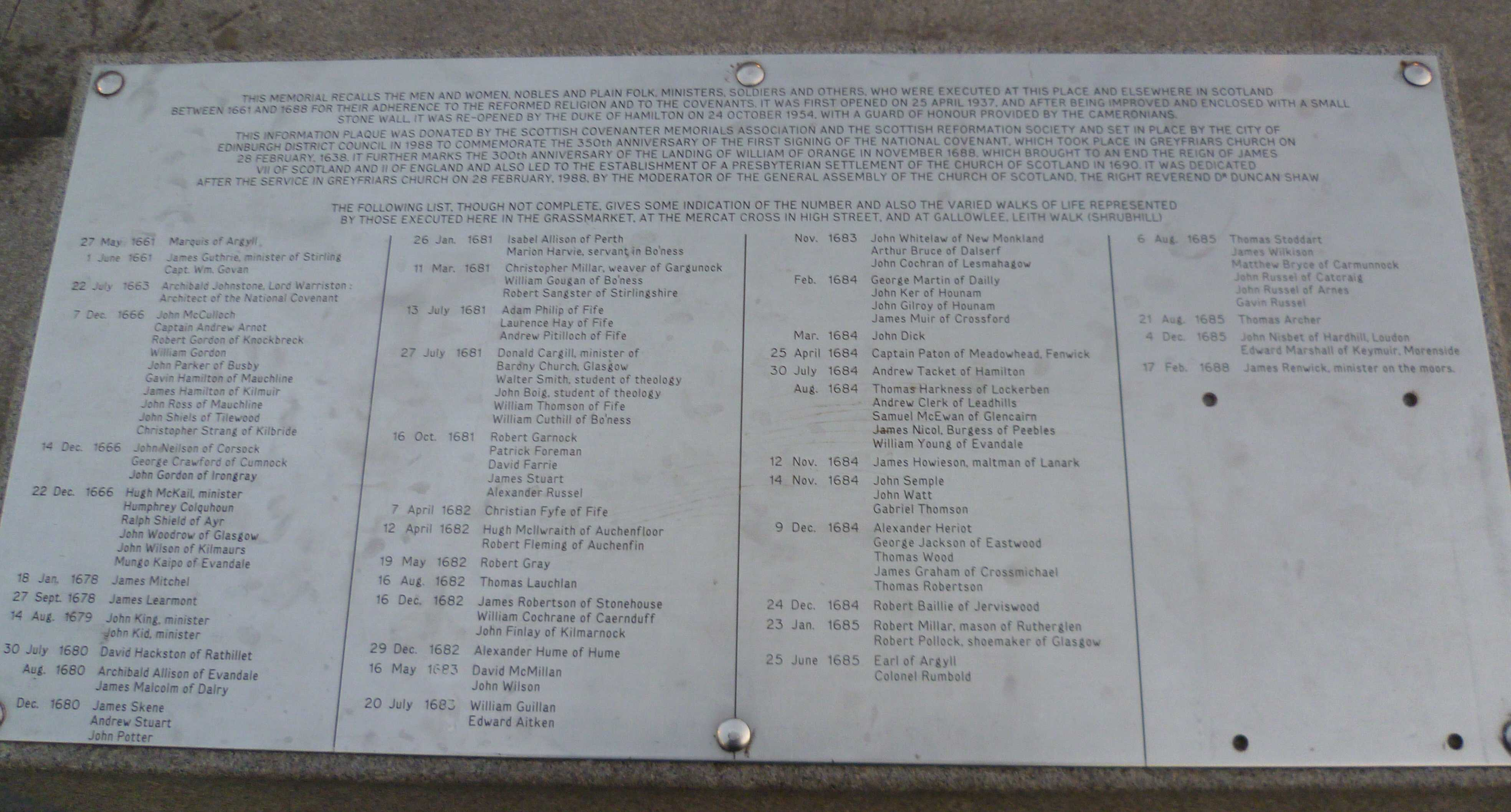
Plaque, Grassmarket

Then, following a hearing before the Privy Council, at which he was indicted for the murder of Sharp, he appeared before the Justiciary and again before the Council which pronounced sentence, ordaining:

That his body be drawn backward on a hurdle to the Mercat Cross; that there be a high scaffold erected a little above the Cross, where, in the first place, his right hand is to be struck off and, after some time, his left hand; then he is to be hanged up, and cut down alive, his bowels to be taken out, and his heart shown to the people by the hangman; then his heart and his bowels to be burned in a fire prepared for that purpose on the scaffold; that, afterwards, his head be cut off, and his body divided into four quarters; his head to be fixed on the Netherbow; one of his quarters with both his hands to be affixed at St. Andrews, another quarter at Glasgow, a third at Leith, a fourth at Burntisland; that none presume to be in mourning for him, or any coffin brought; that no person be suffered to be on the scaffold with him, save the two bailies, the executioner and his servants; that he be allowed to pray to God Almighty, but not to speak to the people; that Hackston's and Cameron's heads be fixed on higher poles than the rest.

— Privy Council.

The execution took place on 30 July 1680. It seems that Hackston had a strong constitution, because, despite the loss of his hands and the disembowelling, it was claimed that his heart continued to beat for some time after it was on the executioner's knife.

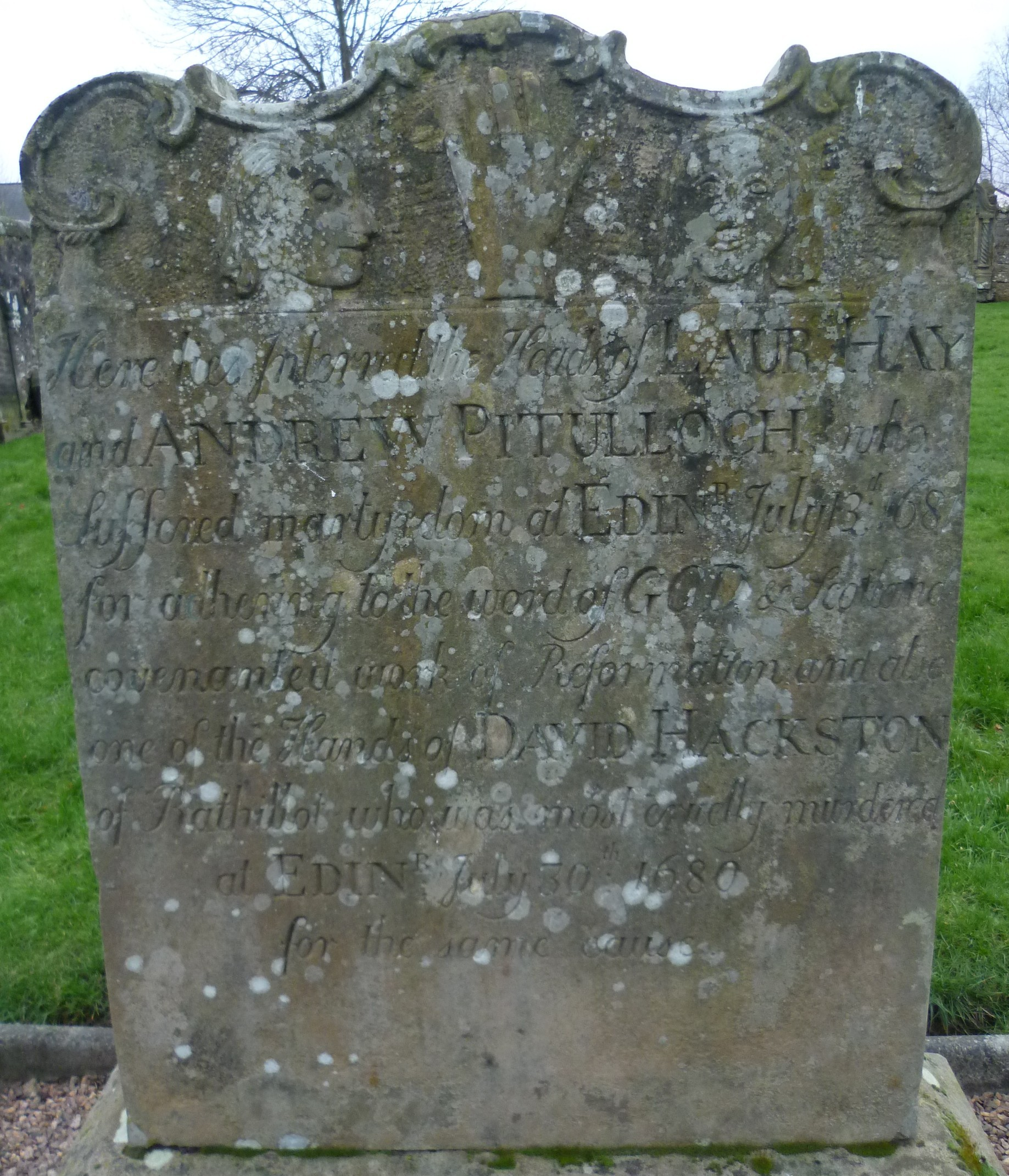
The Covenanters grave in Cupar, Fife contains one of Hackston's hands

== Monuments ==
In the old churchyard at Cupar a tombstone commemorates three sufferers for the Covenant. It is inscribed thus:

"Here lie interred the heads of Laur Hay : and Andrew Pitulloch, who suffered martyrdom at Edinburgh, July 13th, 1681, for adhering to the word of God, and Scotland's covenanted work of reformation; and also one of the hands of David Hackston, of Rathillet, who was most cruelly martyred at Edinburgh, July 30th, 1680.

Our persecutors filled with rage,
Their brutish fury to assuage,

Took heads and hands of martyrs off,
That they might be the people's scoff.

They Hackston's body cut asunder,
And set it up a world's wonder

In several places; to proclaim
These monsters' glory and their shame."
