= Tillietudlem =

Coordinates: 55°41′30″N 03°53′15″W

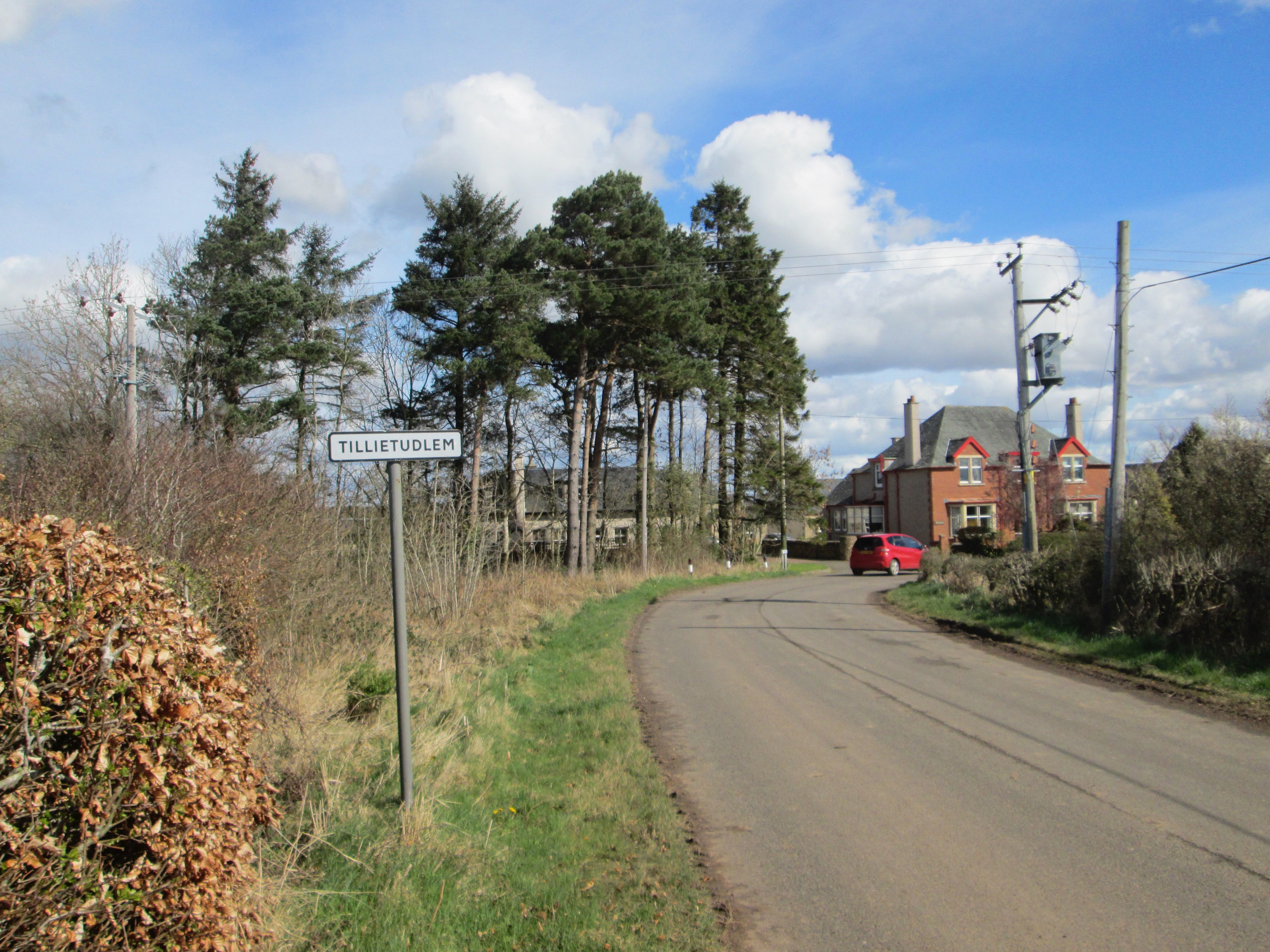
- "Tillietudlem" sign where Southfield Road enters the village from the west

- Location within South Lanarkshire
- OS grid reference: NS809458
- Council area: South Lanarkshire
- Lieutenancy area: Lanarkshire
- Country: Scotland
- Sovereign state: United Kingdom
- Post town: LANARK
- Postcode district: ML11
- Police: Scotland
- Fire: Scottish
- Ambulance: Scottish
- UK Parliament: Lanark and Hamilton East
- Scottish Parliament: Clydesdale

Tillietudlem is a fictional castle in Walter Scott's 1816 novel Old Mortality, and a modern settlement in South Lanarkshire, Scotland.

Interest in Scott's novel attracted visitors to its supposed inspiration, Craignethan Castle, and a railway station built nearby was named after the fictional attraction. Houses built near the station developed into the modern hamlet of Tillietudlem, set along Southfield Road and its continuation as Corra Mill Road.

== Tillietudlem Castle ==
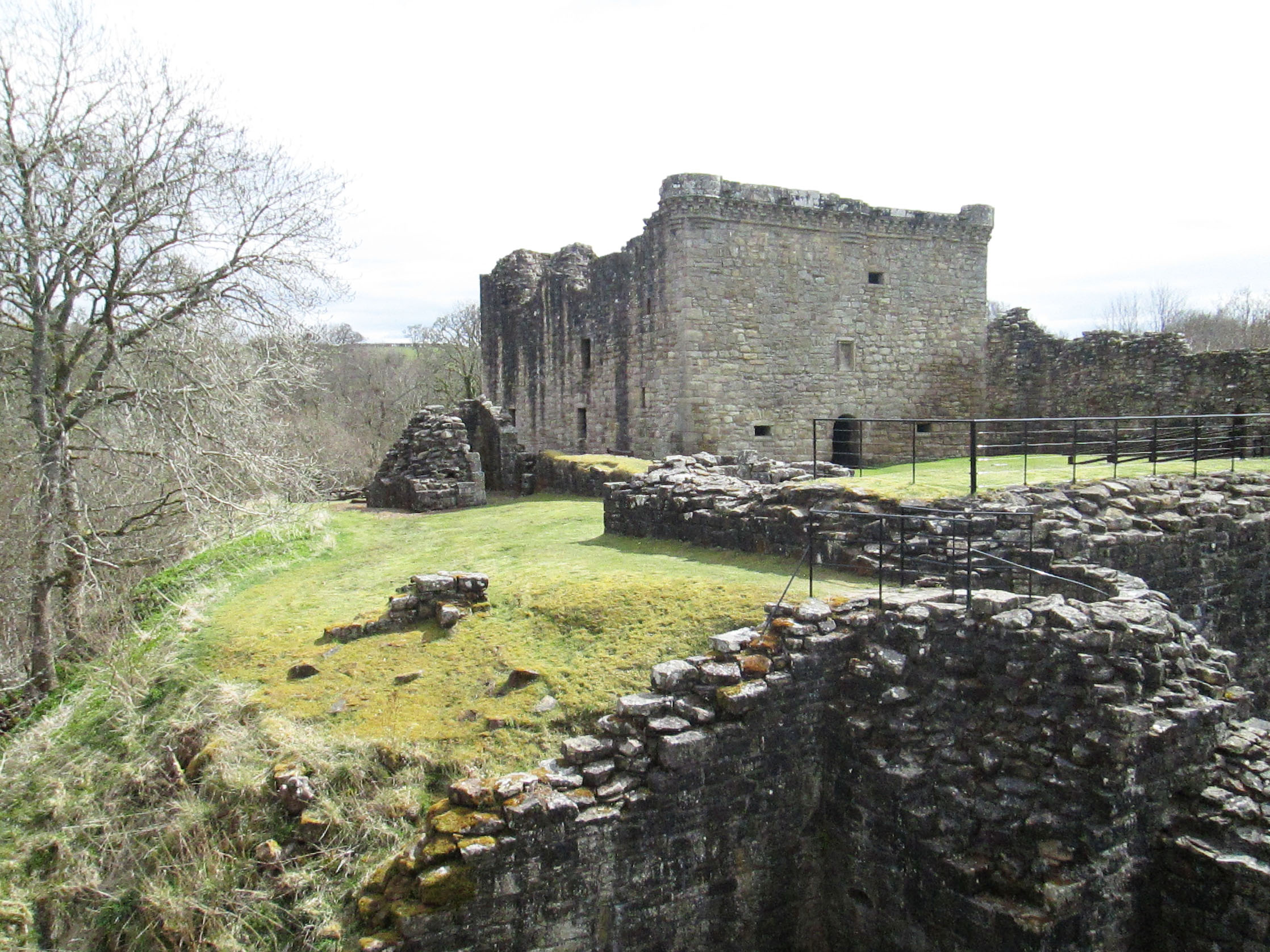
Craignethan Castle, on the edge of the ravine of the Craignethan Burn and Nethan Gorge.

In the Autumn of 1799 the poet Walter Scott made a brief visit to Craignethan Castle, and was enraptured by the scene. When Scott wrote his novel Old Mortality, published in 1816, he set it in South Lanarkshire during the late 17th century conflicts between Royalists and Covenanters, with a mixture of fictional and historical names of people and places. The plot largely takes place in and around the fictional Tillietudlem Castle: Scott's biographer John Gibson Lockhart later wrote that "The name Tillietudlem was no doubt taken from the ravine under the old castle of Lanark–which town is near Craignethan. This ravine is called Gillytudlem." Lanark is around 5.4 miles (8.7 km) from Craignethan, and the castle hill looks out over a gorge to the River Clyde. The Ordnance Survey of 1859 names the gorge "Gullie-tudlem".

Scott's novel describes Tillietudlem Castle as standing on top of "a very precipitous bank, formed by the junction of a considerable brook with the Clyde." By 1821 people had conjectured that Tillietudlem was Craignethan Castle, though the latter stands about 1.5 miles (2.4 km) from the Clyde. No castles in the area fully matched the description in the book, the closest being the Castle of Orbiston at the junction of the South Calder Water with the Clyde near Bothwellhaugh, but Tillietudlem Castle was essentially fictional.

In June 1829 Scott wrote to his friend James Skene that though he "did not think on Craignethan in writing about Tillietudlem", public taste had adopted it "as coming nearest to the ideal of the place." In the revised Magnum Edition of Old Mortality, published in 1830, Scott added a footnote: "The Castle of Tillietudlem is imaginary; but the ruins of Craignethan Castle, situated on the Nethan, about three miles from its junction with the Clyde, have something of the character of the description in the text".

== Tillietudlem tourism ==
Craignethan Castle became a popular place to visit. In notes of his 1833 tour, Orville Dewey recorded that "We left Tillietudlem, three miles from Lanark, on the right, two miles from the road, and out of sight. I am told an old woman near there was very much vexed by the inquiries of rambling visitors, after the publication of Old Mortality. She could not conceive what sent all these people, all at once, asking about Tillietudlem." Scott's son-in-law John Gibson Lockhart took the artist J. M. W. Turner to Craignethan in September 1834, approaching it from the north-east via the Nethan Gorge. The Scottish Tourist of 1836 also describes the approach from the Nethan Gorge to the castle "standing upon a vast rock overhanging the Nethan", adding that from its proximity to Lanark, Bothwell Bridge and Drumclog, "there is no doubt that it is the prototype of the Castle of Tillietudlem". In their 1836 Gazetteer of Scotland entry on the parish of Lesmahagow, Robert and William Chambers described the "noble ruin" of Craignethan Castle, "which is confessedly the prototype of the Tillietudlem of the author of Waverley", before concluding that, on the whole, the area "is well deserving of a visit from the man of science, and equally from the man of taste."

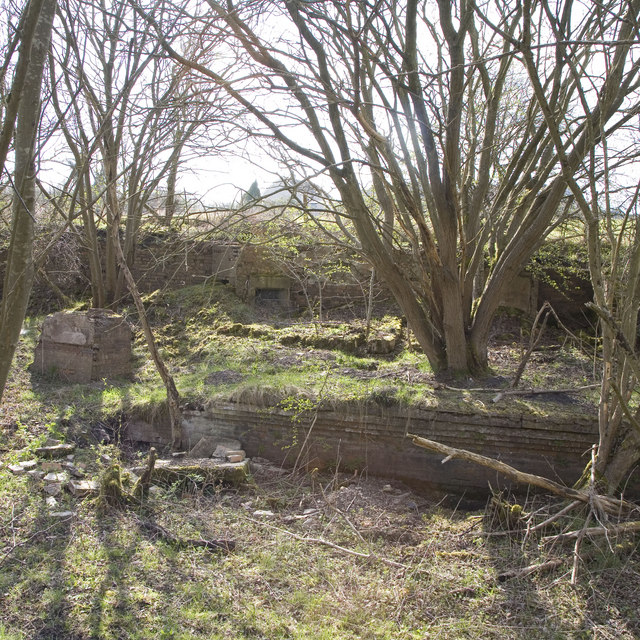
Remains of Tilletudlum railway station platform

In 1866 the Caledonian Railway opened its Coalburn branch line, running north–south about 0.5 miles (800 m) to the west of the castle. At this time a driveway from the castle heading west crossed the railway line before going a short distance south to Fence farm. At the farm, a lane running north from Blackwood joined a lane going east, via a bridge over the railway, downhill to Holmhead Farm at the River Nethan and on to Crossford. In 1876 the railway company added what it called Tillietudlem railway station adjacent to this railway bridge. An 1880 tour guide description of an excursion "To the Falls of Clyde, Tillietudlem Castle, &c," says the station "is but a short walk from the castle".

The railway station closed in 1951, ending the passenger service, and the line was closed to freight in 1968. Platforms and a small ruin of a station building have been left in a dilapidated state, with the line overgrown by trees.

== The hamlet of Tillietudlem ==
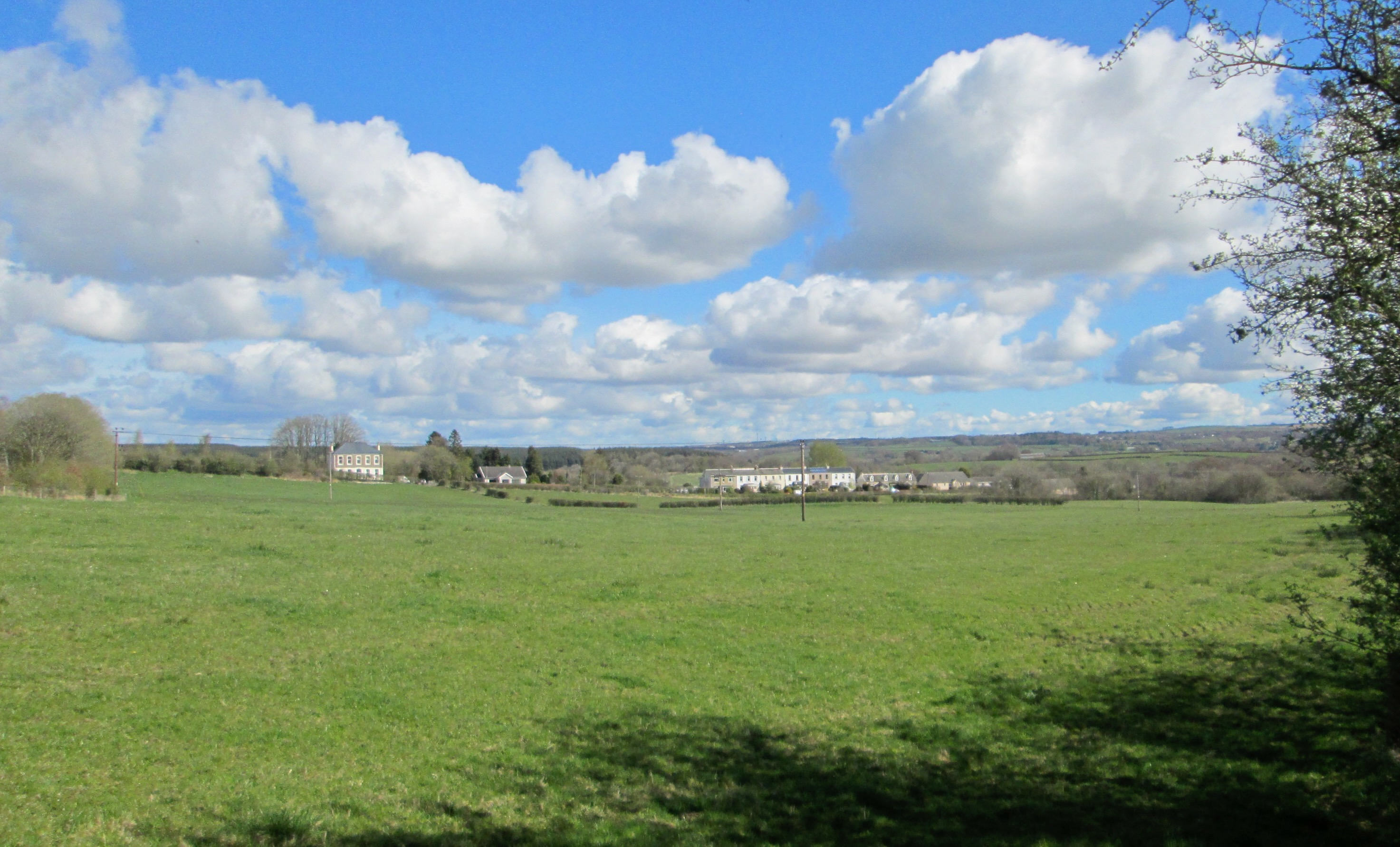
Village seen from field to its south, with Ashfield House to the left, and Fence Terrace to right of centre.

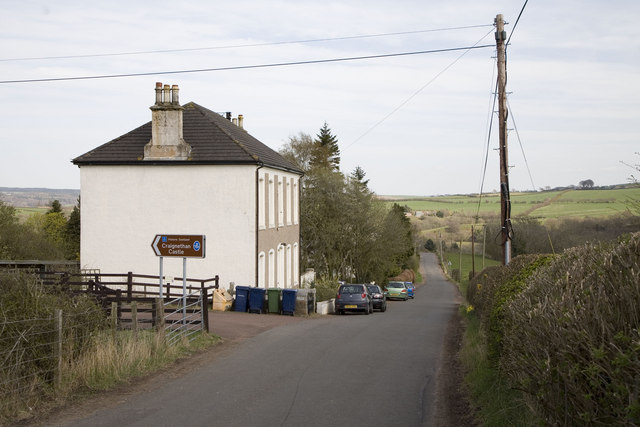
East of the railway bridge, a driveway just before Ashfield House leads north to Craignethan Castle.

Scott's novel refers to "a small hamlet adjacent to the Castle at Tillietudlem." The 1898 Ordnance Survey shows the railway station, with gasworks to its east, and a row of houses named Fence Terrace further east along the road to Corra Mill.

The 1963 revised map shows the driveway to the castle, to the east of the bridge over the disused railway, and the building to the east of the driveway is named as Ashfield House. There has been some further development, and the driveway is now signposted as a Historic Scotland property open to the public for an admission charge.

Southfield Road leads into the village from the west, at Fence Terrace its name changes to Corra Mill Road. Tillietudlem is about 2 miles (3 km) from Crossford, via the Corra Mill Road. Crossford itself is on the A72 between Hamilton and Lanark.
