= James Sharp (bishop) =

Scottish Church of Scotland bishop (1618-1679)

Most Reverend James Sharp
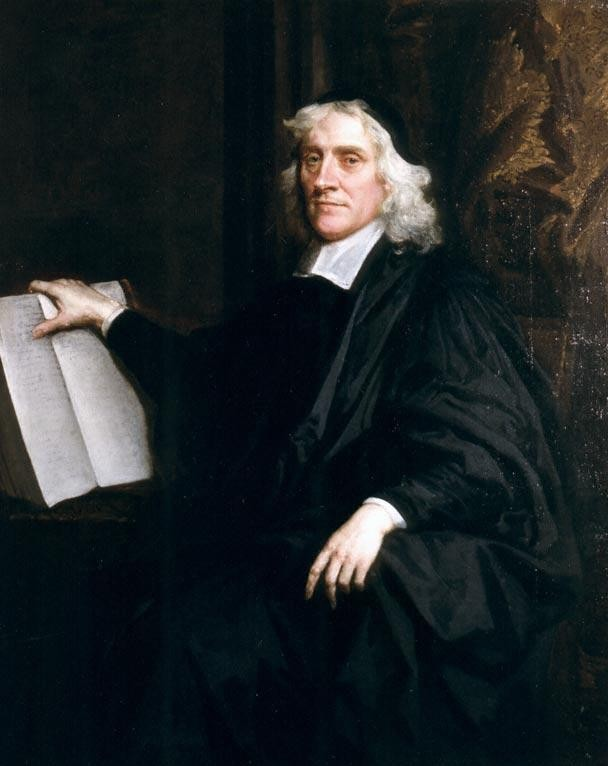
- Archbishop James Sharp by Peter Lely
- Church: Church of Scotland
- Archdiocese: Archbishop of St Andrews
- In office: 1661 to 1679
- Predecessor: John Spottiswoode
- Successor: Alexander Burnet

Orders
- Consecration: 15 December 1661 by Gilbert Sheldon; George Morley

Personal details
- Born: James Sharp; 4 May 1618 Banff Castle
- Died: 2 May 1679 (aged 60) Magus Muir, Fife
- Spouse: Helen Moncrieff (1622–1679)
- Children: 7
- Education: University of Aberdeen

James Sharp, or Sharpe (4 May 1618 – 3 May 1679), was a minister in the Church of Scotland, or kirk, who served as Archbishop of St Andrews from 1661 to 1679. His support for Episcopalianism, or governance by bishops, brought him into conflict with elements of the kirk who advocated Presbyterianism. He was twice the target of assassination attempts, the second of which cost him his life.

== Biography ==
James Sharp was born at Banff Castle on 4 May 1618, eldest son of William Sharp (1592–1638) and Isabel Leslie (1595-ca 1640). His father was property manager, or factor, for the Earl of Findlater; his mother was the daughter of the Laird of Kininvie. His younger brother, Sir William Sharp of Stonihill (1622–1685), was political agent to the Duke of Lauderdale, Scottish Secretary of State from 1661 to 1680.

In April 1653, Sharp married Helen Moncrieff, daughter of the laird of Randerston. They had seven children.

== Background ==
Whilst Presbyterian or Episcopalian now implies differences in both governance and doctrine, this was not the case in the 17th century. 'Episcopalian' meant governance by bishops, usually appointed by the monarch; Presbyterian implied rule by Elders, nominated by their congregations. The Protestant Reformation created a Church of Scotland, or 'kirk', that was Presbyterian in structure and Calvinist in doctrine. When bishops were introduced to the Scottish system in 1584, they were doctrinal Calvinists, who opposed many practices of the Church of England; these differences explain the failure of attempts to unify the two churches.

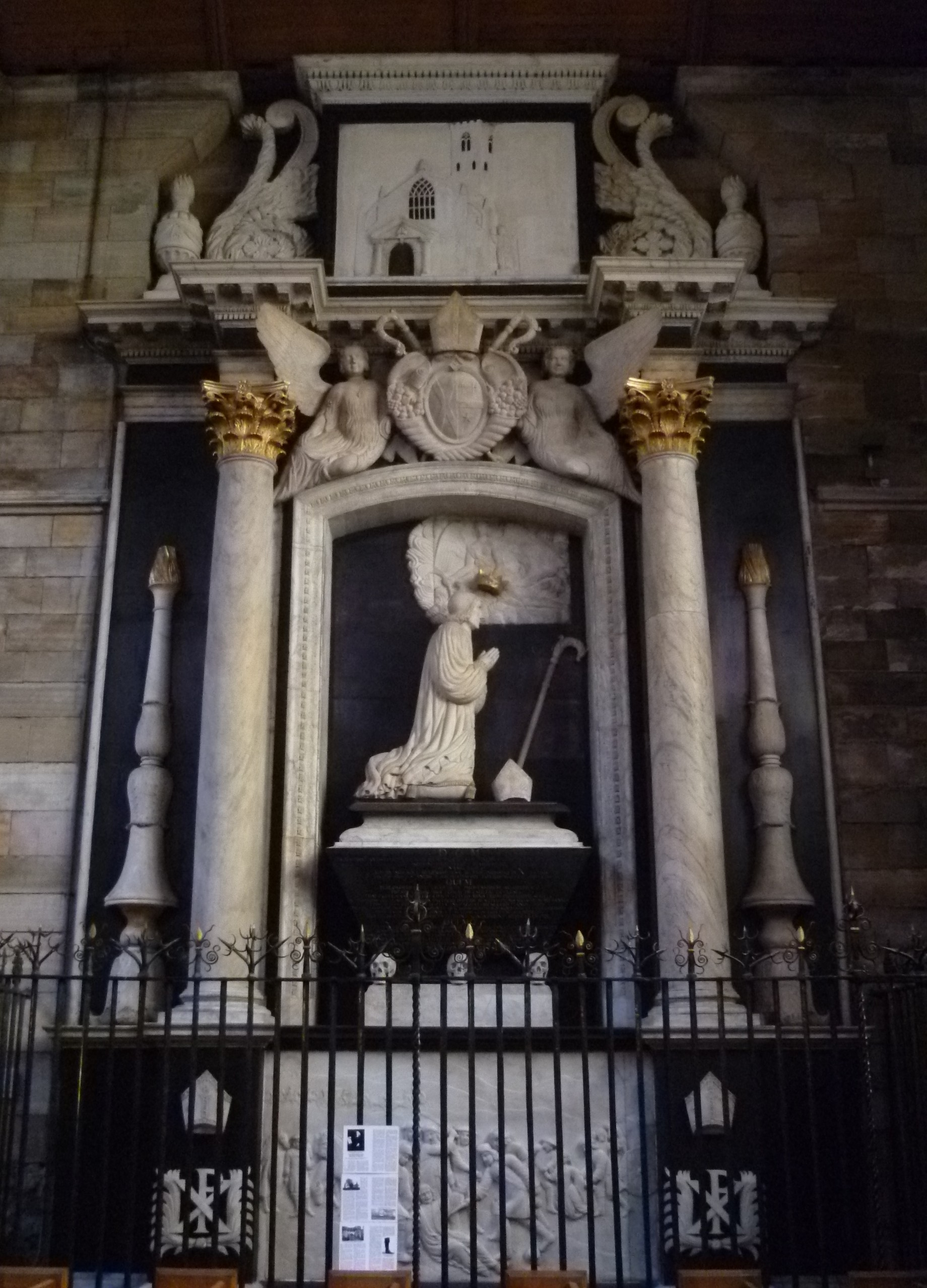
Archbishop Sharp Memorial, Holy Trinity Church, St. Andrews

The 1638 National Covenant expelled bishops and established a Covenanter government, which ruled Scotland during the 1638 to 1651 Wars of the Three Kingdoms. In 1647, Royalist defeat in the First English Civil War and from a Scottish point of view, the English Parliament's failure to uphold the treaty underpinning the alliance between the Scottish Covenanters and the English Parliamentarians, the Solemn League and Covenant or the agreed Westminster Confession of Faith, split the Covenanters into Engagers who sought a rapprochement with Charles I and the Kirk Party, which remained sceptical for the time being; both sides believed the institution of monarchy was divinely ordered, but differed over who held ultimate authority in clerical affairs.

Attempts by the Engagers to restore Charles I, followed by the Kirk Party's Scottish coronoation & support for his son Charles II in his first attempt to take the English throne, ended with incorporation into the Commonwealth of England, Scotland and Ireland in 1652. The kirk split again, between a majority known as Resolutioners, and 'Protestors', who blamed defeat on compromise with 'malignants.' Differences between the two were both religious and political, including church government, religious toleration and the role of law in a 'godly' society.

Since each split ended with the winners evicting the losers from their offices and ministries, it led to increasing bitterness. Lord Broghill, head of the Council of State for Scotland, summarised the position by saying 'the Resolutioners love Charles Stuart and hate us, the Protesters love neither him nor us.' He fostered conflict between the two groups as deliberate policy.

== Career ==
Sharp was educated at the local grammar school and in 1637, graduated from King's College, Aberdeen. The university and Banff in general were centres of Episcopalian support and one of the few areas to oppose the 1638 National Covenant, which removed bishops from the kirk.

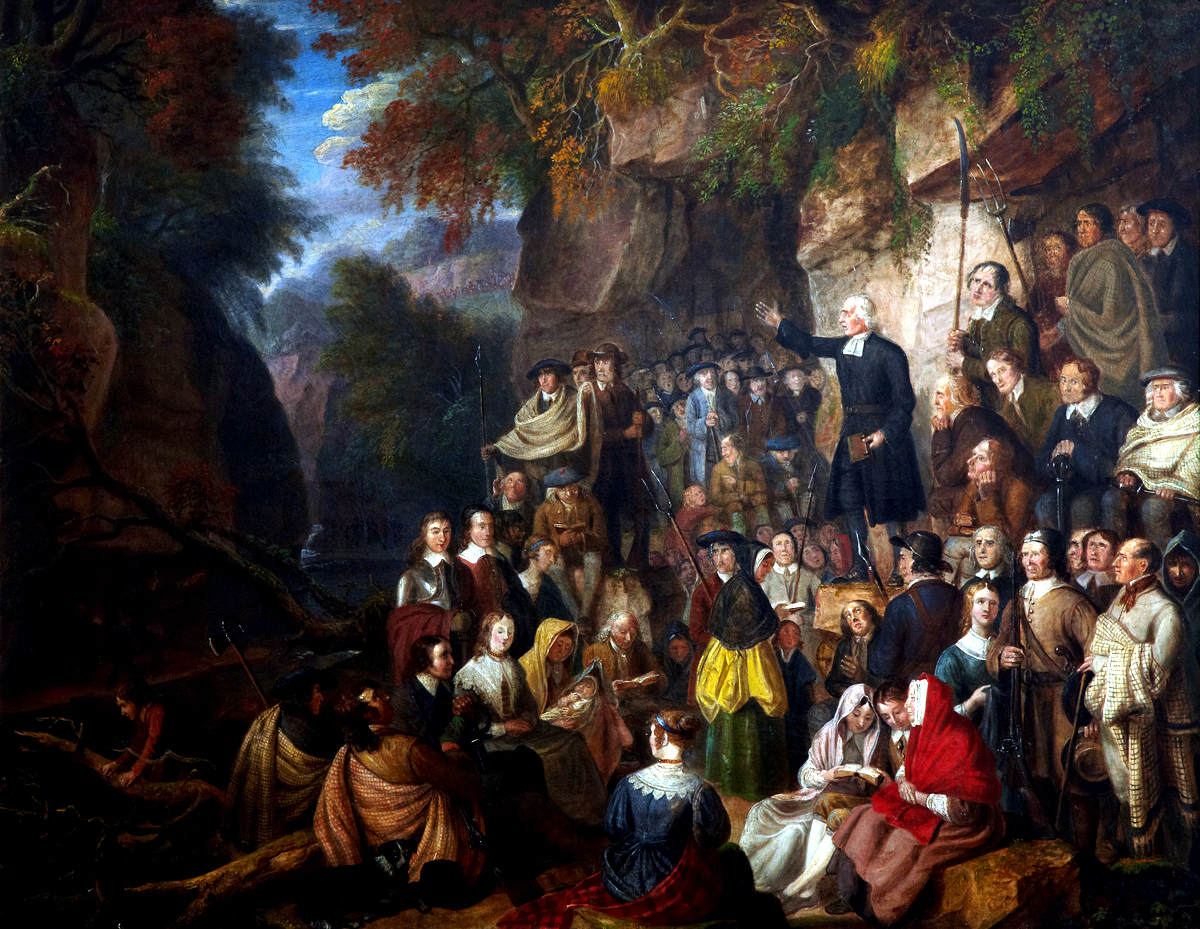
An illegal field assembly or Conventicle; after 1660, Sharp was closely involved in suppressing Presbyterian dissidents

Sharp went to Oxford, allegedly seeking a position in the Church of England, but returned to Scotland and by 1642, was a regent at the University of St Andrews. In 1648, he became minister for the parish of Crail, then a delegate to the kirk's General Assembly in 1650. He accompanied the Scottish army in its invasion of England and was captured at Worcester in September 1651, before being released in 1652.

The Protesters sent a delegation to argue their case before Parliament in 1656; Sharp was selected to represent the Resolutioners and spent most of the next four years in London. By 1659, plans were being made by George Monck to restore Charles II to the thrones of England and Scotland. The Resolutioners wanted Charles to commit to a Presbyterian kirk; in May 1660, Sharp was sent to Breda to ensure he did so, but was unsuccessful in getting a response.

In January 1661, Sharp was appointed Royal Chaplain, and returned to St Andrews as Professor of Divinity. The March 1661 Rescissory Act returned the legal position in Scotland to that prevailing in 1633, removing the Covenanter reforms of 1638-1639. The restoration of bishops was confirmed by the Privy Council of Scotland on 6 September 1661.

Sharp was appointed Archbishop of St Andrews and Primate of Scotland and consecrated at Westminster Abbey in December 1661. The kirk was restored as the national church, independent sects banned and all office-holders were required to renounce the Covenant; about a third of the clergy refused, around 270 in total, and lost their positions as a result. Most occurred in the south-west of Scotland, an area particularly strong in its Covenanting sympathies; some took to preaching in the open fields, or conventicles, which often attracted thousands of worshippers.

After his appointment to the Privy Council of Scotland in June 1663, Sharp assumed responsibility for these evictions, making him a target for Presbyterian radicals. At the same time, his lobbying to be made Lord Chancellor brought him into conflict with Lauderdale and other political leaders. He took an active role in suppressing the Covenanter-backed Pentland Rising in November 1666; he is reported as having condemned to death eleven prisoners who surrendered on a promise of mercy, telling them "You were pardoned as soldiers, but you are not acquitted as subjects".

On 9 July 1668, James Mitchell, a veteran of Rullion Green, tried to assassinate Sharp in Edinburgh. He was seated in his coach on the Royal Mile near his house at Blackfriars Wynd waiting for Bishop Andrew Honeyman to join him. Mitchell fired his pistol at Sharp but hit Honeyman instead. Mitchell was imprisoned on the Bass Rock for this crime but was not executed until 1676.

Soon after, the government issued the first in a series of 'indulgences', allowing the readmission of evicted clergy, even without subscribing to episcopacy. The kirk split once again, this time between moderates, led by Robert Leighton, and 'hardline' Episcopalians under Sharp; over the next decade, policy alternated between persecution and reconciliation.

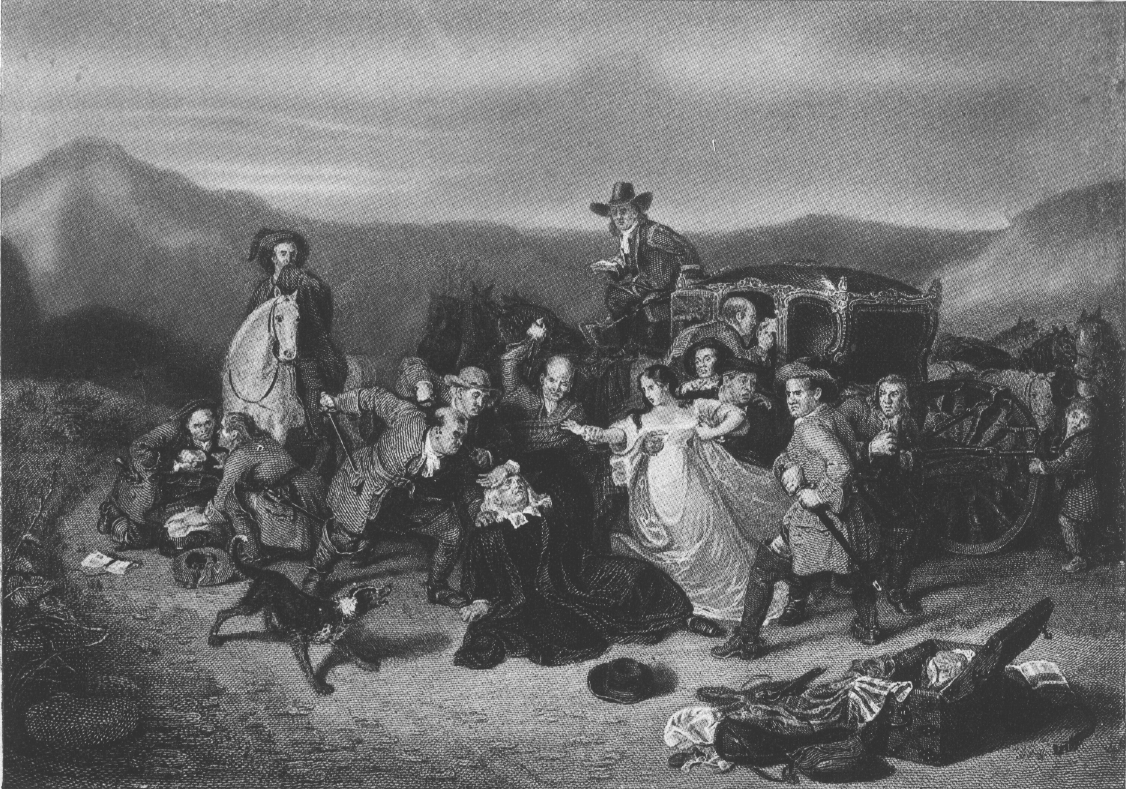
Sharp was murdered by militant Covenanters whilst en route from Edinburgh to St. Andrews.

In 1678, Sharp's faction regained control and supported by the government, stepped up actions against non-conformists; 3,000 Lowland militia and 6,000 Highlanders, known as the "Highland Host", were billeted in the Covenanting shires, as a form of punishment. James Mitchell, who had been arrested in 1673, was executed in 1678, making him a Presbyterian folk hero; Sharp gave evidence at his trial and was accused of perjury.

== Death ==
On 2 May 1679, a group of nine Covenanters, led by David Hackston and his brother-in-law, John Balfour of Kinloch, were waiting at Magus Muir, hoping to ambush the Sheriff of Cupar. A Sharp appointee, the Sheriff was prominent in persecuting Covenanters but apparently heard about the proposed ambush and stayed home. Learning Sharp's coach was on the road, they intercepted it instead; Sharp was stabbed several times, in front of his daughter Isabella, before being killed by a shot to the chest. One of the group, James Russell, claimed he told Sharp he "...declared before the Lord that it was no particular interest, nor yet for any wrong that he had done to him, but because he had betrayed the church as Judas, and had wrung his hands, these 18 or 19 years in the blood of the saints, but especially at Pentland..."

Two of the nine, Hackston and Andrew Guillan, were eventually captured and executed; a third, William Dingwall, died at the Battle of Drumclog a month later. The other six were never tried; Balfour escaped to Holland with George Fleming, but disappears from the records thereafter.

== Aftermath ==
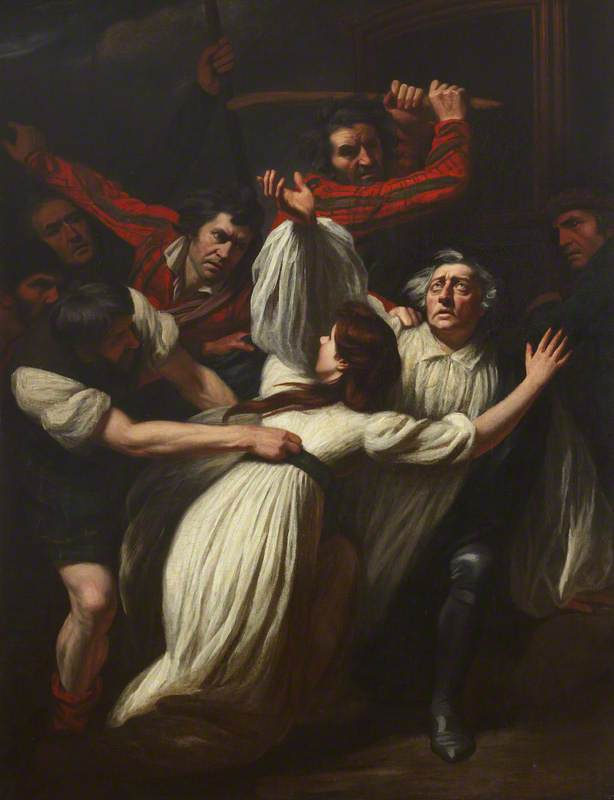
The Death of Archbishop Sharpe by John Opie, 1797

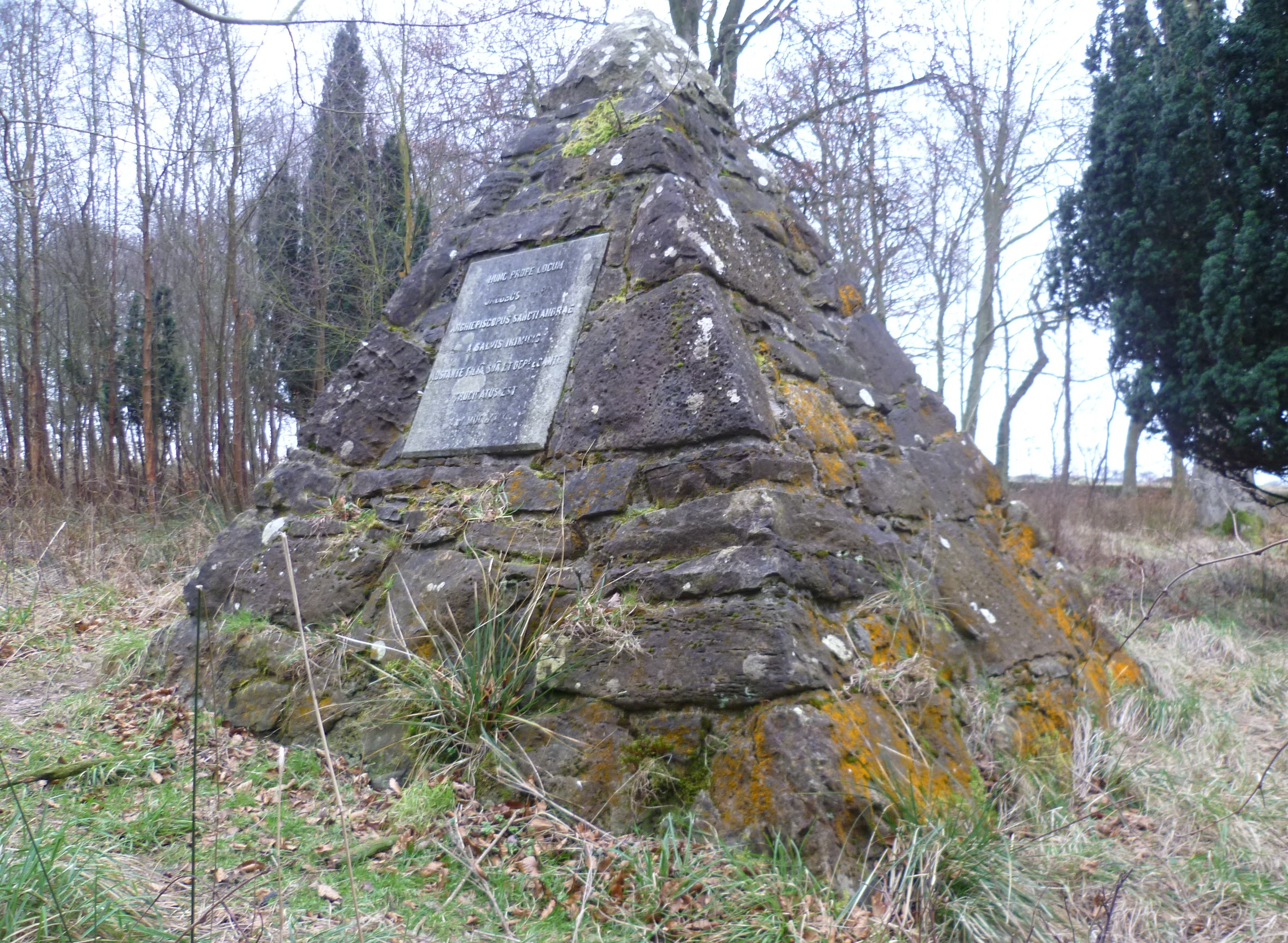
Memorial to Sharp, Magus Muir

Sharp was buried beneath an imposing black and white marble monument in the Holy Trinity Church, St Andrews. Designed by his son, Sir William, it has two main objectives; commemorating his father as a martyr, rather than a turncoat, and confirming his privileged status as archbishop. When the tomb was opened in 1849, it was empty; the body was allegedly removed in 1725 and has never been found.

On 25 December 1679, five Covenanters captured at Bothwell Bridge, Thomas Brown, James Wood, Andrew Sword, John Weddell and John Clyde, were hanged for refusing to identify the perpetrators. Although not involved themselves, they were executed at Magus Muir; their bodies hung in chains until the flight of James VII in 1688. A gravestone was erected over their burial place in 1728 and enclosed by a surrounding wall in 1877; the same year that a memorial to Sharp was built.

19th century Scottish histories portrayed Sharp as a despised turncoat; "For well concocted, cold blooded, systematic dissimulation, he stands almost without a match in History." Even more recent writers suggest his death can be seen as deserved retribution for his actions.

His most recent biographer, Julia Buckroyd, summarised his career as follows; "Sharp, who identified himself as a Scot and Presbytery, and who struggled to extricate Scotland from the Cromwellian union,...became identified as an agent of English, episcopal and political interests...an enemy of Scottish Presbyterianism and the rule of law."

The 1688 Glorious Revolution in Scotland led to the Act of Settlement in 1690, which re-established the kirk on a Presbyterian basis. Episcopacy was immediately abolished since then, leading to the formation of the separate Scottish Episcopal Church in the same 1690.

== Family ==
He was married on 6 April 1653 to Helen who was a daughter of William Moncrieff of Randerston. Their children were:

- Sir William of Scotscraig, created a Baronet 1683, died January 1712
- John, baptised February 1665
- Isabella (married, cont. 18 December 1679, John Cunningham of Barns)
- Catherine
- Margaret, born 8 December 1664 (married 11 October 1683, William Fraser, 12th Lord Saltoun), died 1734
- Penelope (married John Dubh Mackinnon of that Ilk)
- Agnes, buried March 1666
- Robert, sheriff-clerk of Banff.
- Great grandson George Richard Sharp of Leeds, father of Ian George Sharp 1959 of Leeds

== Sources ==
- Armstrong, Phoebe. "Monument to Archbishop James Sharp". Church Monuments Society.
- Dodds, James (1868). The Fifty Years' Struggle of the Scottish Covenanters 1638 to 1688. Houlston And Sons.
- Dow, F D (1979). Cromwellian Scotland 1651-1660 (1999 ed.). John Donald. ISBN 978-0859765107.
- Duncan, Elmer D (1988). "The Life of James Sharp, Archbishop of St. Andrews, 1618 to 1679: A Political Biography. By Julia Buckroyd. Edinburgh: John Donald Publishers, LTD. 1987. 150 pp. $31.50". Journal of Church and State. 30 (3): 607. doi:10.1093/jcs/30.3.607.
- Grant, James (1885). Cassell's Old and New Edinburgh; Volume II. Cassell, Petter, Galpin & Co.
- Holfelder, Kyle (1998). Factionalism in the Kirk during the Cromwellian Invasion and Occupation of Scotland, 1650 to 1660: The Protester-Resolutioner Controversy (PHD). University of Edinburgh.
- Jardine, Mark (21 June 2018). "The Torn Bible of the Covenanter and Assassin Balfour at RUSI". Jardine's Book of Martyrs.
- Mackie, JD; Lenman, Bruce; Parker, Geoffrey (1986). A History of Scotland. Hippocrene Books. ISBN 978-0880290401.
- Macleod, Donald (Autumn 2009). "The influence of Calvinism on politics" (PDF). Theology in Scotland. XVI (2).
- McDonald, Alan (1998). The Jacobean Kirk, 1567–1625: Sovereignty, Polity and Liturgy. Routledge. ISBN 185928373X.
- Mitchison, Rosalind; Fry, Peter; Fry, Fiona (2002). A History of Scotland. Routledge. ISBN 978-1138174146.
- Muir, Alison G (2004). "Balfour, John, of Kinloch". Oxford Dictionary of National Biography (online ed.). Oxford University Press. doi:10.1093/ref:odnb/67514. (Subscription, Wikipedia Library access or UK public library membership required.)
- Mullan, David George (2004). "Sharp, James". Oxford Dictionary of National Biography (online ed.). Oxford University Press. doi:10.1093/ref:odnb/25211. (Subscription, Wikipedia Library access or UK public library membership required.)
- Plant, David. "Scottish National Covenant". BCW Project.
- Russell, James, of Kettle (1817). James Russell's Account of the murder of Archbishop Sharp 1679. J. Ballantyne.
- Scott, Hew (1928). Fasti ecclesiae scoticanae; the succession of ministers in the Church of Scotland from the reformation. Vol. 7. Edinburgh: Oliver and Boyd. pp. 326-327.

Church of Scotland titles
Preceded by John Spottiswoode	Archbishop of St Andrews; 1661–1679	Succeeded by Alexander Burnet
Academic offices
Preceded by The Earl of Loudoun	Chancellor of the University of St Andrews; 1661–1679	Succeeded by Alexander Burnet; Archbishop of St Andrews
