= Altrive Tales =

Altrive Tales (1832) by James Hogg is the only volume to have been published of a projected twelve-volume set with that title bringing together his collected prose fiction. It consists of an updated autobiographical memoir, a new novella, and two reprinted short stories.

== Background ==
When Hogg's four-volume Poetical Works appeared in 1822 it was natural that he should contemplate a similar collection of his prose fiction. He made several attempts to interest publishers during the rest of the decade, most notably William Blackwood, but was constantly frustrated. Matters reached a head in 1830 when Hogg's financial situation became precarious with the expiration of his tenancy of the Mount Benger farm. Blackwood continuing unresponsive, Hogg apparently concluded an agreement in late 1831 with the London publisher James Cochrane, for a sequence of twelve volumes appearing every other month in imitation of Walter Scott's immensely successful magnum opus Waverley Novels. Unfortunately Cochrane failed a few days after the publication of the first volume in April 1832 and Hogg was unable to find a replacement.

== Editions ==
Altrive Tales: Collected among the Peasantry of Scotland, and from Foreign Adventurers. By The Ettrick Shepherd was published in London by James Cochrane and Co. in mid-April 1832 in a print run of 3000

A critical edition, by Gillian Hughes, appeared in 2003 as Volume 13 in the Stirling/South Carolina Research Edition of The Collected Works of James Hogg published by Edinburgh University Press.

== Contents ==
'Dedication. To the Right Honourable Lady Anne Scott, of Buccleugh [Lady Anne Elizabeth Montague Scott (1796‒1844)]' (first published in The Brownie of Bodsbeck in 1818; here with small revisions).

'Memoir of the Author's Life' (first version published in The Mountain Bard in 1807; updated version in the 1821 third edition; here further revised).

'Reminiscences of Former Days' (first published here): a continuation of Hogg's autobiographical memoir to the present, adding brief reminiscences of Sir Walter Scott, Southey, Wordsworth, Allan Cunningham, Galt, John Gibson Lockhart, and Robert Sym (1750‒1840).

'The Adventures of Captain John Lochy, Written by Himself' (first published here): a picaresque novella recounting the adventures at the beginning of the eighteenth century, mostly on the Continent, of a Scottish soldier of unknown but probably noble parentage.

'The Pongos: A Letter from Southern Africa' (first published in Blackwood's Edinburgh Magazine in 1829 as 'A Singular Letter from Southern Africa. Communicated by Mr Hogg, the Ettrick Shepherd'): the correspondent tells of the abduction and retrieval of his baby son and then his wife by a set of orangutans whose royal cub he had killed.

'Marion's Jock' (first published as the 'Laird of Peatstacknowe's Tale' in The Three Perils of Man in 1822): the narrator tells in Scots the story of a voracious cowherd called Jock.

== Reception ==
The reviewers concentrated very largely on Hogg's 'Memoir' and 'Reminiscences'. His power as a story-teller was acknowledged, though with some objections to incoherence and coarseness. The poetical dedication to Anne Scott attracted general praise for its elegance and delicate feeling.
