= Mary McKinnon =

Scottish brothel keeper and murderer (died 1823)

- Died: 16 April 1823; Parliament Square, Edinburgh
- Cause of death: Hanging
- Occupations: Brothel keeper; prostitute
- Criminal charges: Murder of William Howatt
- Criminal penalty: Execution and dissection

Mary McKinnon (died 16 April 1823) was a Scottish brothel keeper and prostitute from Edinburgh who was found guilty and hanged for the murder of William Howatt. She was convicted for stabbing Howell with a knife during a scuffle at her brothel on 8 February that year, though present-day academics variably note that her conviction was based on scant evidence and her sentence may have been influenced by her status and the high public interest in the case. She had popular support and sympathy, though saw opposition from the gentry of the city. After her execution at Parliament Square, Edinburgh attended by 15,000 to 30,000 people, she was dissected at the University of Edinburgh and her skull was used in a lecture by phrenologist George Combe.

== Life and career ==
McKinnon was a daughter to parents who lived in Glasgow. According to the Edinburgh Observer's a Biographical Account of McKinnon's life, she had a lack of education, and her mother died early in her life. This account detailed how she was seduced at 15 years of age by a man who later abandoned her, and how she had arrived in Edinburgh in poverty and with an illegitimate son in 1812. By 1823, McKinnon was a brothel keeper and prostitute who ran a brothel at her fashionable house at 82 South Bridge street in Edinburgh. This was located nearby the offices of newspapers, particularly that of the Edinburgh Literary Gazette and the Scotsman, and had been almost opposite the Blackwood publishing firm which resided at 16 South Bridge until 1817.

== Stabbing ==
On the evening of 8 February 1823, a group of six men, including writer's clerk William Howatt, visited McKinnon's brothel, though McKinnon was not there, being out with a neighbour at the time. The men were directed to a private room, and given a jug of toddy and the company of the women working there. As the men left, they refused to pay their full bill, prompting a scuffle to break out there between them and seven women who worked at the brothel. McKinnon then arrived during the drunken brawl at about midnight, finding all of her brothel's lights extinguished, and sent for the police before attempting to force the men to leave.

When police arrived they found Howatt had a small stab wound in his chest. This was a fatal injury. Though David Groves in 1987 argued that what took place is unclear, Rachel Bennett has described in 2018 that when McKinnon made the choice to intervene in the fight, Howatt grabbed one of the women by the hair, and in response, McKinnon reached for a knife that was close by and used it to stab Howatt.

The day after the stabbing, Howatt, who was still alive at the time, as well as one of the other men, alleged that McKinnon had committed the stabbing. Howatt would die days later.

== Trial ==
McKinnon's trial took place in March, two months following the incident, and took 18 hours. The courtroom was full at McKinnon's trial and similarly Parliament Square as well as the High Street were crowded with those waiting for the results.

David Groves has argued that the prosecution had "flimsy evidence". McKinnon was defended by Francis Jeffrey, who spoke of the men's "state of intoxication" during the incident and their "inconsistencies" and "inaccuracy of recollection" afterward. He also argued that the only proven aspect of the case was that McKinnon and Howatt had met in the house and no more, and put forward that she had been a victim of misfortune. She did not testify against anyone else present during the murder. Bennett has argued that it would have been possible to reduce the murder charge to the non-capital charge of culpable homicide, or argue that she enacted self-defence, neither of which happened. Bennett has also noted that between 1740 and 1834, 16 men were pardoned for murder who had caused the deaths during fights because they did not have premeditation to murder; Bennett has argued that McKinnon was not pardoned in this way because of her brothel-keeper status, as well as the high public interest in the murder.

=== Murder conviction ===
McKinnon was found guilty by a jury majority, as this was all that was needed for a guilt verdict under Scottish law. The jury also recommended that McKinnon be given mercy, though there is no evidence that the judge endorsed the recommendation. The judge gave her a death sentence, telling her to prepare for her execution. It was noted in the Caledonian Mercury that "she was in a state of insensibility" when it was read out that her body was to be dissected, and that her attendants had "very humanely kept her ignorant of the circumstance."

She was jailed in the Magdalene Asylum. Following her conviction, McKinnon was visited daily by Reverend Andrew Thomson, and they sung Psalms together. She said to him that because of her life of prostitution, "she considered herself equally guilty as if she had inflicted the blow, but always denied having struck it". Her sister also visited her. She pleaded with the visitors to her in jail for the decent burial of her body without dissection or other punishment.

== Execution ==
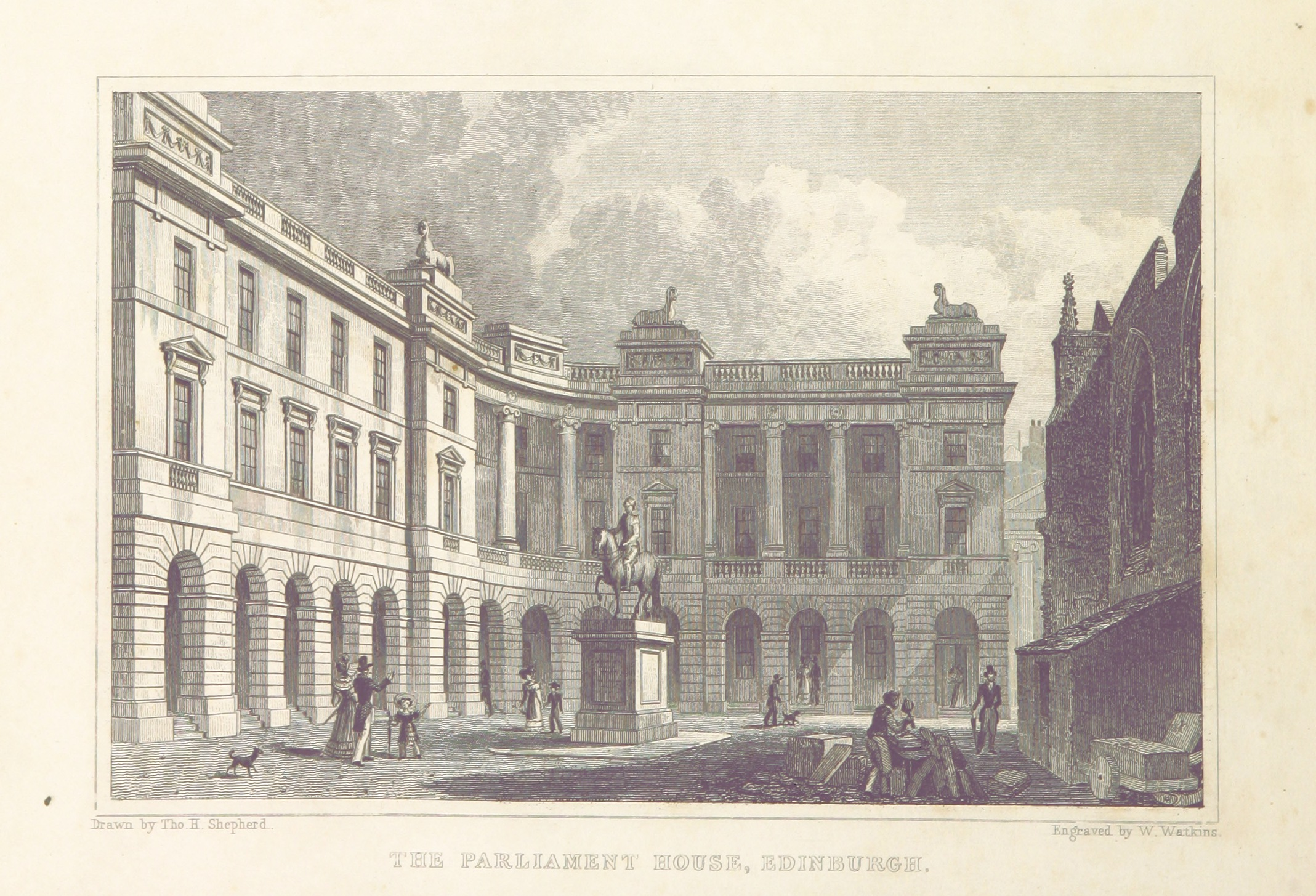
Edinburgh's Parliament Square, where McKinnon was hanged, in 1829

McKinnon was hanged in public on 16 April 1823, at 32 years of age, on Parliament Square, Edinburgh. 15,000 to 30,000 people watched the execution, lining the High Street from Edinburgh Castle to Holyrood Palace, and many expressed sympathy as she mounted the scaffold. The Glasgow Courier wrote that:

As she approached the scaffold, the greater part of the people who lined the way, or who were within the railing round the scaffold, took off their hats, and remained uncovered; and as far as we could judge, seemed to commiserate her unhappy fate.

It was reported that McKinnon "vomit[ted] an immense quantity of bile" when she was climbing the scaffold steps. A narrative of the execution by The Scotsman read:

The executioner now proceeded to divest the unhappy culprit, who continued seated, of her bonnet, and to draw over her face a large muslin cap without any border. The rope was then adjusted round her neck and attached to the beam, when she uncovered her face, and addressed some words to the executioner, complaining of the tightness of the rope, and with her hand waved an adieu to the multitude. After drawing the cap again over her face, she stood erect;—the executioner whispered to her to take her time;—almost instantly she threw away the fatal signal, and expired without an apparent struggle.

The execution made McKinnon one of five women executed for the murder of a stranger between 1740 and 1834, and the only one of these in this period to lack any financial motivation nor premeditation. She at the time was the only woman to be hanged in Edinburgh in recent memory.

=== Dissection ===
McKinnon was then publicly dissected at the University of Edinburgh by Professor Munro; the Edinburgh Weekly Journal wrote that "the head was dissected by the learned professor in the presence of his pupils", and that Munro was "so kind as to permit a cast to be taken" of her skull by George Combe, another lecturer and a phrenologist. Combe would go on to use McKinnon's skull in a lecture to a large audience in Edinburgh, in which he claimed that all murderers had "a round cannon-bullet form" at the backs of their skulls.

== Responses ==
Groves purports that McKinnon's hanging was "one of the most controversial events of the Romantic age in Britain." From McKinnon's trial until her execution, McKinnon would see a significant sympathetic response from the public. Once citizen wrote to McKinnon's judge, "I hope Satan will be as successful in frustrating the attempts you make for a reprieve [at the Last Judgment] as you have been in frustrating Mrs McKinnon's."

The gentry of Edinburgh, in contrast, largely opposed positive depictions of McKinnon, with Tory newspaper the Edinburgh Weekly Journal calling her "this miserable woman" on 2 April. An anonymous letter writer "expressed great anxiety for her conviction, and from the Trial until the Execution, great Solicitude that no mercy should be extended to her."

The Edinburgh Observer published a Biographical Account of her life, numbering 15 pages. It wrote that she was "more a subject for compassion than hatred," and argued that "whatever errors Mary Mackinnon [sic] may have been guilty of, she had a heart that was not innately depraved. [...] She had not that diabolic malice that wishes for society in its fall: her natural disposition was bent towards the good of others". Similarly, the Edinburgh Literary Gazette created a twelve-page issue on McKinnon, despite only being known for its coverage of literature. As many as eight different broadside ballads were sold in Edinburgh on the day of her execution. Publications detailed a reputation in her community for kindness toward beggars, the poor, as well as those perceived as invalids; one writer noted that "the unhappy criminal was not destitute of benevolence to the poor, but visited the sick in the neighbourhood of her house, and ministered to their relief." She was additionally noted for the "great affection" she held toward her sixteen-year-old son. Responding to her execution, the Glasgow Courier reported on 17 April that "No execution since that of [Deacon] Brodie, in the 1788, has excited so powerful a sensation as that of Mrs. McKinnon."

After her execution, discussion of McKinnon among polite classes largely stopped, aside from a mention in the letters of Henry Cockburn. Publications about McKinnon also largely halted.

Groves has argued that McKinnon's story has strong parallels with that of James Hogg's The Three Perils of Woman, which Hogg started in October 1822 and finished in April 1823, particularly in the character Keatie M'Nab, as well as the character of imprisoned Edinburgh prostitute Bell Calvert and posthumous dissection of the character of Robert Wrighim in Hogg's work The Private Memoirs and Confessions of a Justified Sinner (1824). Groves has also suggested that Thomas De Quincey's short publication on "The Daughter of Lebanon" may have been an allegory of McKinnon's final weeks of life.

== Sources ==
- Bennett, Rachel E. (2018). Capital Punishment and the Criminal Corpse in Scotland, 1740–1834. Cham: Palgrave Macmillan. doi:10.1007/978-3-319-62018-3. ISBN 978-3-319-62017-6.
