= Margaret Laidlaw =

Scottish tradition-bearer (1730–1813)

- Born: 1730; Ettrick, Scotland
- Died: 1813 (aged 82–83); Ettrick, Scotland
- Known for: Tradition-bearer
- Children: James Hogg

Margaret Laidlaw m. Hogg (1730–1813) was a tradition-bearer who collected native Scottish ballads from Ettrick in the Scottish Borders.

== Life ==
Margaret Laidlaw was born in 1730 in Ettrick, Scotland to Bessie Scott and William Laidlaw. Her father, known as Will o' Phawhope, was said to have been the last man in the Border country to speak with the fairies.

In 1765, she married tenant farmer Robert Hogg (1729–1820) and the couple had four sons, including poet and novelist James Hogg. A religious woman, Laidlaw raised her children with knowledge of the Bible and local storytelling. In 1836, Laidlaw's son William writes in The New Monthly Magazine that Laidlaw was an adept storyteller of "tales and songs of spectres, ghosts, fairies, brownies, voices, &c".

== Works ==
In James Hogg's Familiar Anecdotes of Sir Walter Scott (1834), Laidlaw commented on Walter Scott's editing of her collection of ballads in the Minstrelsy of the Scottish Border (1802–3): "they war made for singing, and no for reading; and they're nouther right spelled nor right setten down". Scott wrote that Margaret Laidlaw "sings, or rather chants...with great animation".

She greatly influenced James Hogg's work, who described her as "the best friend that ever I had." The relationship inspired the spirited mother of The Marvellous Doctor in Blackwood's Edinburgh Magazine, 21 (1827), the diminutive Scottish Gaelic-speaker in The Love Adventures of George Cochrane, Winter Evening Tales (1820) vol. ι., and The Private Memoirs and Confessions of a Justified Sinner (1824).
