= Mador of the Moor =

Poem by James Hogg

Mador of the Moor is a narrative poem by James Hogg, first published in 1816. Consisting of an Introduction, five cantos, and a Conclusion, it runs to more than two thousand lines, mostly in the Spenserian stanza. Set in late medieval Scotland, it tells of the seduction of a young maiden by a charismatic minstrel and her journey to Stirling in search of him, leading to the revelation that he is the king and finally to their marriage and the christening of their son.

== Background ==
In the autumn of 1813 Hogg spent two or three weeks at Kinnaird House near Dunkeld in Perthshire, where his hostess Eliza Izett urged him to write something about the River Tay. He decided to produce a narrative rather than a purely descriptive poem. He seems to have completed composition in February 1814, but decided to hold publication back to allow The Pilgrims of the Sun (written shortly after the completion of Mador) to appear first, in December 1814 (dated 1815). Hogg corrected proofs of Mador in the spring of 1816, and it finally achieved publication in April of that year.

== Editions ==
Mador of the Moor; A Poem. By James Hogg, Author of the Queen's Wake &c. was first published in Edinburgh by William Blackwood on 22 April 1816, and in London by John Murray. It was reprinted in the fourth and final volume of Hogg's Poetical Works published by Archibald Constable in Edinburgh in 1822. This edition omitted 'The Harper's Song' from Canto First, including it as a separate item in the second (Midsummer Night Dreams) volume with the title 'The Gyre Caryl'. It was to appear again, reworked in a modernised and more reader-friendly form, as 'Superstition and Grace', in the annual The Bijou for 1829, and finally in Hogg's A Queer Book in 1832.

A critical edition, by James E. Barcus, appeared in 2005 as Volume 16 in the Stirling/South Carolina Research Edition of the Complete Works of James Hogg published by Edinburgh University Press.

== Summary ==
Introduction: The poet addresses the River Tay.

Canto First (The Hunting): During a hunting expedition the King of Scots (a combination of the 14th-century Robert II and the 16th-century James V) and his followers hear 'The Harper's Song' sung by the minstrel Gilbert of Shiel, telling of an old man caring for a baby girl serenaded by fairies. Just such an old man arrives and beckons the king away: when the monarch returns, he finds that his hunters have been mysteriously slain.

Canto Second (The Minstrel): Ila Moore, betrothed to her father's liege lord Albert of the Glen, is wooed by a charismatic and capricious figure, the visiting minstrel Mador of the Moor, who flees when attacked by Albert.

Canto Third (The Cottage): Albert expels Ila and her parents before she gives birth to Mador's son.

Canto Fourth (The Palmer): Ila sets out to find Mador. On the way she is joined by a protective palmer, who confesses that in the past his sexual misconduct led to infanticide.

Canto Fifth (The Christening): Arriving at Stirling, Ila is informed that the name of Mador is unknown there, but through the intervention of the Abbot of Dunfermline it is revealed that Mador is the king. The couple are married and their son christened with his father's name.

Conclusion: The poet addresses his harp, urging it to return from its Highland excursion to its native Border region.

== Reception ==
There were ten reviews of Mador of the Moor, evidencing a wide variety of responses. There was considerable appreciation of Hogg's powers of natural description, but a widespread view that he was less happy with the Spenserian stanza than he had been with the ballad form. The supernatural elements were a cause of discontent.
