= Queen Hynde =

Scottish epic poem

Queen Hynde (1825) is an epic poem in six cantos (nearly 9000 lines) by James Hogg. Set in western Scotland in the sixth century, it tells the story of the defeat of an invading Norwegian army by forces loyal to Queen Hynde, advised by Columba, and of the winning of her hand by the legitimate claimant of the throne Eiden. It is mostly in octosyllabic couplets.

== Background ==
The setting of Queen Hynde had its origin in a late spring holiday in Argyllshire which Hogg enjoyed in 1816. He probably began to compose the poem in 1817, but when he had nearly completed the third book he put the poem on hold following the poor reception of his Dramatic Tales published in February that year. Paradoxically, it seems to have been further failures six years later that prompted Hogg to take up and complete his epic poem: his novels The Three Perils of Man (1822) and The Three Perils of Woman (1823) did not meet with success, prompting him to offer Queen Hynde to Longman, who accepted it on 12 February 1824. Composition was completed on 10 July.

== Editions ==
Queen Hynde. A Poem, In Six Books. By James Hogg, Author of The Queen's Wake; Poetic Mirror; Pilgrims of the Sun, &c. &c. was published in London by Longman, Hurst, Rees, Orme, Brown, and Green, and in Edinburgh by William Blackwood. It appeared on 18 December 1824, dated 1825.

A critical edition of the poem, edited by Suzanne Gilbert and Douglas S. Mack, appeared in 1998 as Volume 6 in the Stirling/South Carolina Research Edition of The Collected Works of James Hogg published by Edinburgh University Press. This is based on Hogg's manuscript and restores some short passages cut for the first edition.

== Summary ==
Book First: The dying king of Scots Eugene commends his daughter as his successor. Queen Hynde dreams of a terrifying invader. She journeys, with her mischievous follower Wene, to Iona to seek Columba's advice, and he accompanies her back to her capital Beregon (Beregonium).

Book Second: A messenger disguised as a maniac announces that hostile Norwegian forces have landed. The Scots have the worst of the ensuing conflict. Columba is dispatched to the Norwegian king Eric and brings back news of his determination to marry Queen Hynde. She decides to accept him, subject to his victory in the lists.

Book Third: Prince Haco, Eric's nephew and heir, professes his love to Wene, who is pretending to be Queen Hynde. The Scottish nobility assemble and back a truce, after debate. In accordance with instructions from the ghost of King Conran (Eugene's brother and Queen Hynde's uncle), Columba goes to Ireland to bring back Conran's son Eiden as true heir to the throne. King Colmar of Ireland, Eiden's maternal grandfather, who has adopted him as his heir, sends Columba packing. Arriving back in Scotland Columba is joined by an impressive young pagan M,Houston.

Book Fourth: Donald Gorm of Skye breaks the truce and is defeated by Haco's men. Eric reluctantly agrees that Haco should enter the lists. Gorm thinks better of his trucebreaking and kills a captive heathen priest to stop him revealing his action. In a triple combat in the lists Haco defeats Gorm and Eric defeats Mar; in the third combat Allan Bane is about to defeat Osnagar, but Eric intervenes to subdue the Scot before claiming Queen Hynde's hand.

Book Fifth: Wene visits Eric's camp to be near Haco. Eric proposes to sacrifice her and her virgin entourage at the instigation of his high priest, but they are rescued by a mysterious band of clansmen. A messenger informs Eric that Queen Hynde has left Beregon for Dunstaffnage and he launches a general assault in which he kills the valiant and honourable Coulan Brande. He arranges funeral games in Brande's honour, in which he is bested by M,Houston.

Book Sixth: Columba tells Eric that he must win in the lists again to secure Queen Hynde's hand. He and two colleagues are defeated by M,Houston (revealed as Eiden) and two other Scots, and Queen Hynde takes Eiden as her husband. Colmar arrives and acclaims the union between Albyn and Erin in the royal marriage. Eiden/M,Houston leads the Scots to victory against the invaders, though Colmar dies in the conflict. Beregon, where the followers of Odin have committed many atrocities, is consumed with fire from Heaven.

== Reception ==
Although several of the reviewers acknowledged Hogg's genius, with some appreciation of his descriptive power and humour, there was widespread puzzlement at his generic and stylistic instability, and disapproval of what was seen as indelicacy, and a lack of reverence in the treatment of the Celtic saints.
