= The Shepherd's Calendar (James Hogg) =

1829 collection by James Hogg of 21 articles

The Shepherd's Calendar is an 1829 collection by James Hogg of 21 articles, most of which had appeared in Blackwood's Edinburgh Magazine since 1819. They are set in, or deal with aspects of, the Scottish Borders, in particular Hogg's native Ettrick Forest.

== Background ==
On 1 September 1825 Hogg proposed to William Blackwood that the 'Shepherd's Calendar' articles which had been appearing in Blackwood's Edinburgh Magazine should be brought together in book form. In June the following year Blackwood suggested that Hogg's nephew Robert might correct (basically, formalise) and alter (basically, censor) the contents, but in the autumn he put off publication blaming the stagnation of the market. To Hogg's frustration, it was another three years before the two-volume set, wholly edited by Robert, saw the light of day.

== Editions ==
The Shepherd's Calendar. By James Hogg, Author of "The Queen's Wake," &c. &c. In two volumes was published by William Blackwood, Edinburgh, and T[homas] Cadell, London in 1829.

A critical edition edited by Douglas Mack appeared in 1995 as the first volume in The Stirling/South Carolina Research Edition of The Collected Works of James Hogg, published by Edinburgh University Press. This omits five items deemed not intended by Hogg to be included: 'Nancy Chisholm', 'The Prodigal Son', 'The School of Misfortune', 'The Marvellous Doctor', and 'A Strange Secret'. The items included are based on the texts originally published in Blackwood's Edinburgh Magazine, except for 'Storms' which takes the surviving manuscript as copy text.

== Contents (1829) ==
(revised by Robert Hogg)

Volume One

I. 'Rob Dodds' (first published in Blackwood's Edinburgh Magazine in March 1823 as 'The Shepherd's Calendar. Class Second. Deaths, Judgments, and Providences')

- In the present year, 1823, Andrew, an old shepherd, tells his master of the history of the Ettrick Forest, and of the death in the snow of Rob Dodds, a young shepherd, resulting from harsh treatment by his master.

II. 'Mr Adamson of Laverhope' (first published in Blackwood's Edinburgh Magazine in June 1823 as 'The Shepherd's Calendar. Class Second. Deaths, Judgments, and Providences')

- In July 1753 Adamson, a man liable to extreme fits of temper, mistreats a poor neighbour and an old beggar Patie Maxwell, before being killed by lightning in a ferocious summer storm.

III. 'The Prodigal Son' (first published in The Edinburgh Magazine, and Literary Miscellany in September and November 1821 as 'Pictures of Country Life. No. I. Old Isaac' and 'Pictures of Country Life. No. II. Continued from p. 219')

- The daughter of old Isaac, a minister, tries to dissuade him from attending the deathbed of a young profligate who has corrupted her son and her daughter Euphemia, but he persists in his intention and secures the sinner's repentance. On a second visit he finds the sinner convalescent, and ready to marry Euphemia.

IV. 'The School of Misfortune' (first published in The Edinburgh Magazine, and Literary Miscellany in December 1821 as 'Pictures of Country Life. No. III. Continued from p. 452. The School of Misfortune')

- Examples illustrating the proper response to misfortunes—greater circumspection, and perseverance.

V. 'George Dobson's Expedition to Hell' (first published, with No. VI, in Blackwood's Edinburgh Magazine in May 1827 as 'The Shepherd's Calendar—By the Ettrick Shepherd. Dreams and Apparition. Containing George Dobson's Expedition to Hell, and the Souters of Selkirk.')

- George, an Edinburgh hackney-coach proprietor, dreams of driving a gentleman and son to hell and of engaging to return the next day. When he wakes up, he is obsessed with the need to keep his engagement and dies imagining he is making the return journey.

VI. 'The Souters of Selkirk' (first published in Blackwood's Edinburgh Magazine in May 1827: see No. V)

- The Selkirk cobblers are subject to a double trick: first in being induced individually to make boots for a visiting gentleman, then in having the money paid abstracted by another gentleman, while being addressed in both cases as 'souter', a title abhorrent to them.

VII. 'The Laird of Cassway' (first published in Blackwood's Edinburgh Magazine in August 1827 as 'The Shepherd's Calendar. By the Ettrick Shepherd. Dreams and Apparitions.—Part IV')

- Two brothers agree to fight a duel over their love for Ellen Scott (Thomas regarding her as a potential mistress, Francis as a potential wife). They are dissuaded by a manifestation of their absent father, the laird of Cassway, apparently raised by Ellen's maternal aunt who has the reputation of being a witch.

VIII. 'Tibby Hyslop's Dream' (first published in Blackwood's Edinburgh Magazine in June 1827 as 'The Shepherd's Calendar. Dreams and Apparitions.—Part II. Containing Tibby Hyslop's Dream, and the Sequel')

- Tibby is ill-treated by her master, but her testimony in court results in him being ruined and taking his life. Both Tibby and her great-aunt have powers which enable them to foresee the events of the story.

IX. 'Mary Burnet' (first published in Blackwood's Edinburgh Magazine in February 1828 as 'The Shepherd's Calendar. Class IX. Fairies, Brownies, and Witches. By the Ettrick Shepherd')

- In the reign of James IV (1488‒1513) John Allanson, a dissolute young man, tries to entice Mary Burnet into an assignation. She appears, but throws herself into a loch and apparently perishes. John informs her father, but they find Mary safe in bed, though distressed. She then vanishes while haymaking. Two years later, John is invited by Mary to join her in a wonderful castle. He disappears, and his body is found in a ravine occupying the site of the apparent castle. After another five years, following the advice of a dwarf, Mary's parents meet her and her two sons briefly at Moffat and she assures them that she is happy.

X. 'The Brownie of the Black Haggs' (first published in Blackwood's Edinburgh Magazine in October 1828 as 'The Brownie of the Black Haggs. By the Ettrick Shepherd')

- Lady Wheelhope is suspected of the murder of a succession of servants, but she meets her match when a weird odd-job-man arrives. She becomes possessed with hatred of him, and when he is dismissed after she has killed her son and heir in mistake for him she pursues him and he torments and finally kills her before disappearing. He is remembered locally as The Brownie of the Black Haggs.

XI. 'The Laird of Wineholm' (first published in Blackwood's Edinburgh Magazine in July 1827 as 'The Shepherd's Calendar. Dreams and Apparitions, containing Smithy Cracks, &c. Part III')

- Clinkum, a blacksmith, learns that the ghost of the recently deceased laird of Wineholm has been seen, and that his son-in-law Dr Davington is thought to have murdered him. The matter is investigated legally and a joiner testifies that the laird is alive, having revived in his coffin. Dr Davington absconds and is seen no more.

Volume Two

I. 'Window Wat's Courtship' (first published in Blackwood's Edinburgh Magazine in March 1824 and February 1825 as 'The Lasses')

- Wat Scott, called 'Window Wat' from his bashfulness as a wooer, and his more assertive companion Jock Jewel are at cross-purposes in courting two sisters. Wat helps Jock to elope to Edinburgh with the younger sister, whom he himself fancies, accompanied by her older sibling, but events result in the two couples ending up correctly matched.

II. 'A Strange Secret' (the first part first published in Blackwood's Edinburgh Magazine in June 1828 as 'A Strange Secret. Related in a Letter from the Ettrick Shepherd'; the rest here published for the first time)

- Thomas Henderson, the principal narrator, tells how he observed Julia, sister of the Earl his master, together with a reputed witch Eppie Cowan, burying sets of clothes belonging to Julia's baby son. He related the story to the Earl and was discharged for his own safety. Seeking more information Henderson is put in touch with a Mr MacTavish and presents the resulting epistolary communication as a continuous, highly elaborate, narrative. Forced by the Catholic authorities to give up her baby, Julia asks MacTavish to keep track of the child's movements. The baby is brought up in a cottage by Elspeth Cowan, but carried off by a foxhunter lodging with them. Elspeth, possessed of supernatural insight, proclaims that MacTavish is destined to rediscover the young man, which after several adventures he does and the youth's legitimacy is established.

III. 'The Marvellous Doctor' (first published in Blackwood's Edinburgh Magazine in September 1827)

- An old doctor who has developed a plant-based elixir causing people to follow him tells of his winning a trial of skill with a rival professor before the king and queen of Spain, and of his narrowly escaping with his life from a herd of cattle enraged by the potion while he was attempting to court a countess.

IV. 'The Witches of Traquair' (first published in Blackwood's Edinburgh Magazine in April 1828 as 'The Shepherd's Calendar. Class IX. Fairies, Deils, and Witches. By the Ettrick Shepherd')

- A few years before the Reformation, Colin Hyslop of Traquair is saved from local diabolical powers by a vial of liquid, supplemented by a medal, bestowed by two supernatural ladies. The Master Fiend arranges for him to be tried as a warlock by a Catholic court, when his beloved Barbara prompts him to acknowledge that he has been helped by the Blessed Virgin (though he has been brought up by a Reformed father). He goes on to become wealthy under Catholic patronage, marrying Barbara.

V. 'Sheep' (first published in Blackwood's Edinburgh Magazine in April 1827 as 'General Anecdotes. Sheep')

VI. 'Prayers' (first published in Blackwood's Edinburgh Magazine in April 1827 as 'General Anecdotes. Prayers')

VII. 'Odd Characters' (first published in Blackwood's Edinburgh Magazine in April 1827 as 'General Anecdotes. Odd Characters')

- Most of the sketch is devoted to William Laidlaw of Phawhope (Will o' Phaup, Hogg's grandfather), a conspicuous drinker and fighter, and the last man in Ettrick to converse with fairies.

VIII 'Nancy Chisholm' (first publication here)

- Nancy's beloved Archibald tells her that her father is facing bankruptcy. When her father discovers that she knows this he is enraged and beats her. She leaves for Aberdeen, where she lives embittered until her repentant father discovers her after three years. She rejects him, but when Archibald arrives she mellows and they are married. The couple prosper, enabling Nancy to repair her ruined father's fortunes.

IX 'Snow-storms' (first published in Blackwood's Edinburgh Magazine in April and May 1819 as 'The Shepherd's Calendar. Storms'; reprinted in Winter Evening Tales in 1820)

X. 'The Shepherd's Dog' (first published in Blackwood's Edinburgh Magazine in February 1824 as 'The Shepherd's Calendar. Class IV. Dogs', and here combined with Hogg's earlier article in March 1818 'Further Anecdotes of the Shepherd's Dog')

== Contents (1995) ==
(edited by Douglas Mack)

Storms

Rob Dodds

Mr Adamson of Laverhope

Dogs

The Lasses

General Anecdotes

George Dobson's Expedition to Hell and The Souters of Selkirk

Tibby Hyslop's Dream

Smithy Cracks

The Laird of Cassway

Mary Burnet

The Witches of Traquair

The Brownie of the Black Haggs
