= The Pilgrims of the Sun =

The Pilgrims of the Sun is a narrative poem by James Hogg, first published in December 1814, dated 1815. It consists of four cantos, totalling somewhat less than 2000 lines. In similar vein to 'Kilmeny' in The Queen's Wake (1813), it tells of a young woman's journey to an ideal world and her return to Earth.

== Background ==
After completing his Highland poem Mador of the Moor in February 1814, Hogg conceived the idea of 'a volume of romantic poems, to be entitled "Midsummer Night Dreams".' The first poem he composed for this project was Connel of Dee, in which a shepherd's social aspirations come to an end when he has a nightmare of a hellish marriage and violent death. Hogg then completed a second poem in three weeks, The Pilgrims of the Sun, offering a contrasting vision of a journey to a heavenly world. A short poem 'Superstition' was also intended for Midsummer Night Dreams, but when James Park of Greenock read Hogg's recent poems in manuscript and judged The Pilgrims of the Sun to be the best, it was decided to publish The Pilgrims separately (with 'Superstition'), leap-frogging Mador of the Moor. Connel of Dee first appeared in Winter Evening Tales (1820).

== Editions ==
The Pilgrims of the Sun; A Poem. By James Hogg, Author of the Queen's Wake, &c. appeared in Edinburgh on 12 December 1814, with the date 1815 and the publishers given as 'London: Printed for John Murray, 50, Albemarle Street: and William Blackwood, South Bridge Street, Edinburgh'. However, Murray was disappointed when he read the entire poem, and when it appeared in London in January 1815 the publication details had been changed to 'Edinburgh: Printed for William Blackwood, South Bridge Street; and sold by J. Murray, London'. The volume also contained 'Superstition'. The two poems were included, with Connel of Dee and other poems, in a revived Midsummer Night Dreams in the second volume of Hogg's Poetical Works published in 1822 by 'Archibald Constable & Co. Edinburgh; and Hurst, Robinson & Co. London'.

A critical edition of The Pilgrims of the Sun is included in James Hogg, Midsummer Night Dreams and Related Poems, edited by the late Jill Rubenstein and completed by Gillian Hughes with Meiko O'Halloran, which appeared in 2008 as Volume 24 in the Stirling/South Carolina Research Edition of The Complete Works of James Hogg published by Edinburgh University Press.

== Summary ==
Part First (in ballad stanzas): Mary Lee of Carelha' is transported through space by a young spirit called Cela to a 'blest land of love and truth' close to the Sun.

Part Second (in blank verse): Reaching the Sun itself, Cela and Mary pass close to God's pavilion, encompassed by adoring hosts, and Cela explains that a passing comet is an obsolete world cut adrift by God.

Part Third (in heroic couplets): Cela and Mary visit a series of worlds, notably those of lovers and warriors, before he escorts her back to Earth where it transpires that her widowed mother and friends are mourning her death.

Part Fourth (in heroic couplets): Mary is restored to life and marries Hugo of Norroway, a bard who reminds her of Cela. The narrator observes that after their deaths in old age their presence has continued to be felt spiritually, but to his regret Mary has not appeared to him.

== Reception ==
The reviews of The Pilgrims of the Sun were broadly favourable. Hogg was particularly gratified by the approval of the theologically inclined Eclectic Review, which compared him favourably with Scott and Byron. His descriptive powers were praised, and his fancy was found remarkable, if tending to the wild; but there were reservations about the changes in metre.
