= A Queer Book =

1832 poetry collection

A Queer Book (1832) is a collections of 26 poems, mostly short narratives, by James Hogg, all but two of which had been previously published, more than half of them in Blackwood's Edinburgh Magazine.

== Background ==
The earliest reference to A Queer Book is found in The Edinburgh Literary Journal in December 1830. It was envisaged as a companion volume to Songs, by The Ettrick Shepherd, which had appeared at the end of January 1831 and been well received. The new volume is a collection of 26 poems, longer than those in Songs and (apart from the first two) assembled from periodicals between 1825 and 1831: more than half the poems first appeared in Blackwood's Edinburgh Magazine. Although Hogg left the final choice of poems to his nephew Robert and William Blackwood he gave fairly detailed guidance. Reluctantly, he also agreed that the two men should be permitted to modernise his 'beloved ancient stile'

== Editions ==
A Queer Book. By The Ettrick Shepherd, published by William Blackwood in Edinburgh and T[homas] Cadell in London, appeared at the end of April or beginning of May 1832. A thousand copies were printed.

A critical edition, by P. D. Garside, appeared in 1995 as Volume 3 in the Stirling/South Carolina Research Edition of The Complete Works of James Hogg, published by Edinburgh University Press. In view of the non-authorial changes made to Hogg's text, especially the modernising of his 'ancient stile', this edition recovers texts from manuscript (in eleven cases), Blackwood's Edinburgh Magazine (in nine cases), and Annuals (in six cases), but it preserves the 1832 contents and their order.

== Contents ==
=== The Wyffe of Ezdel-more ===
First publication here.

- Fytte the fyrste: The Laird of Gilbertoun shoots a pair of moorhens, unaware that they are two lovers transformed by a witch. Together laird and witch bury the pair (in human form), the witch singing a dirge.
- Fytte the seconde: The witch tells Gilbertoun her story: after her father had sold her into slavery she burned down the royal harem, emerging from the flames as a spirit. Returning home, she found her lover unfaithful and refused to forgive him: as a consequence she was condemned to a thousand-year penance.
- Fytte the thrydde: The witch transforms three virgins disappointed in love into birds, one of them a lark. The lark takes Gilbertoun's fancy and he asks to be transformed himself, but the witch turns him into an unattractive crow.
- Fytte the fourthe: The crow Gilbertoun asks for his mother's prayers, but she arranges for him to be shot by a thresher, and he is buried (in human form).

=== Robyn Reidde ===
First publication here.

- Fytte the fyrste: Robyn Reidde, a simpleton, displays his skill in archery at an administrative meeting on the Border. Lord Douglas willingly agrees that he should enter the service of the English Lord Scrope.
- Fytte the seconde: At Bury St Edmunds a monk gets the better of an aggressive trooper with his staff and is identified by some of the observers as Robyn.
- Fytte the thrydde: Robyn defeats a French fencing master at Newcastle, and then (as a blacksmith) Lord Douglas before King James who makes him a royal page.

=== Elen of Reigh ===
First published in Blackwood's Edinburgh Magazine in 1829. When Elen's bosom companion Maria Gray dies, she sings in tribute to her before following her into redeemed bliss.

=== The Goode Manne of Allowa ===
Subtitled "Ane most strainge and treuthfulle Ballande Made be Mr Hougge". First published in Blackwood's Edinburgh Magazine in 1828; retitled 'The Good Man of Alloa' in A Queer Book.

An old man lamenting his lack of riches to dispense to the needy is taken by a lady on an amphibious palfrey to collect royal booty from a sunken ship. On his return, however, he keeps the treasure for himself, and the lady and her palfrey are observed taking him off to hell.

=== Jock Johnstone the Tinkler ===
First published in Blackwood's Edinburgh Magazine in 1829. Jock misdirects the Lord of Douglas who is pursuing the Lord of Ross and Douglas's beloved Harriet of Thirlestane. Jock defeats Douglas, and then two of his squires, in the encounters that result, before revealing himself to be the Lord of Annandale, Ross's brother.

=== A Lay of the Martyrs ===
First published in The Amulet for 1830. Marley Reed tells Marjory Laing of her callous treatment when she asks a captain to release her Covenanting bridegroom James on the road, and when she attempts to save him in Edinburgh by giving gold to a duke, only to be confronted with his head on a pole. On both occasions she proclaims her admiring love for James.

=== A Cameronian Ballad ===
First published in The Amulet for 1831; retitled 'Bothwell Brigg' in A Queer Book. After lamenting Janet's loss of her Covenanting husband, a lady reveals to her that she found him among the wounded at Bothwell Bridge, and that she has nursed him back to health.

=== The Carle of Invertime ===
First published in The Anniversary for 1829. The keeper of the gate leading to the afterlife is moved by the approach of an old lady accompanied by the form of a young woman who sings of the lady's virtuous life.

=== The Lairde of Lonne ===
Subtitled "Ane Rychte Breiffe and Wyttie Ballande Compilit by Maister Hougge". First published in Blackwood's Edinburgh Magazine in 1830; retitled 'The Laird of Lun' in A Queer Book. The Laird of Lonne arrives at Landale and attempts to woo a wealthy maiden, Mariote, but she feigns poverty and dismisses his pretensions. She tells him to come back and fight the first local man he meets. Following her instructions, Lonne is soundly defeated by a beggar who turns out to be Lord Home, and is duly accepted by Mariote.

=== Ringan and May ===
Subtitled "Ane rychte murnfulle dittye Maide be Mr Hougge". First published in Blackwood's Edinburgh Magazine in 1825; retitled 'Ringan and May' in A Queer Book. May recalls the unsettling effect of Robyn's interpretation of a lark's love song which has a force that she finds impossible to resist.

=== The Grousome Caryl ===
Subtitled "Ane most Treuthful Ballant Compilit be Mr Hougge". First published in Blackwood's Edinburgh Magazine in 1825; retitled 'The Gruesome Carle' in A Queer Book. The Lord of Annerdaille seeks out a fearful predator and his entourage at the Greye-Meris Linne, but his men are routed. A celebrated archer, Johne of Littledeane, cunningly shoots the reiver dead and the rest of the band are hanged. A clairvoyant, Peter of Bodisbecke, sees the souls of the predators being transported by devils to hell (i. e. Galloway).

=== Love's Jubilee ===
First published in The Literary Souvenir for 1826. In a dialogue, two spirits charged with the oversight of virgins and youths respectively explore the virtuous expression of earthly love.

=== Ane Rychte Gude and Preytious Ballande ===
Subtitled "Compylit be Mr Hougge". First published in Blackwood's Edinburgh Magazine; in 1828 retitled 'The Spirit of the Glen' in A Queer Book. A dominie passes on to Marjorie a warning by a fearsome spirit, but she is confident in her own virtue and sets out to meet her lover. After further warnings by a brownie and an old woman she rejects the advances of a tempting youth. She encounters the fearsome spirit who demonstrates the duplicity of her lover and deposits her in the bed of the dominie, whom she marries.

=== Jocke Taittis Expeditioune till Hell ===
Subtitled "Compilit bee Maister Hougge". First published in Blackwood's Edinburgh Magazine in 1830; retitled 'Jock Tait's Expedition to Hell' in A Queer Book. Jock laments the death of his fiancée, whose profligacy has consigned her to hell. The Devil agrees to accept Jock in her place. Hell turns out to involve a series of disappointing liaisons, and Jock forgives his fiancée's small failings. He wakes from what turns out to have been a dream and is duly married.

=== A Bard's Address to his Youngest Daughter ===
First published in Friendship's Offering for 1830. Hogg expresses his affection for his fourth child Harriet Sidney, born in 1827.

=== Johnne Graimis Eckspeditioun till Heuin ===
Subtitled "Compilit be Mr Hougge". First published in Blackwood's Edinburgh Magazine in 1831; retitled 'The Miser's Warning' in A Queer Book. Arriving in heaven, John is surprised to encounter a fallen woman. She explains to him that the prerequisite for admission is repentance. Waking from what turns out to be a dream, John is inclined to repent and restore his ill-gotten gains, but the sight of his gold is too much for him at the last. The narrator commends him to God's mercy.

=== St. Mary of the Lows ===
First published in Forget Me Not for 1829. The speaker pays tribute to those buried in St Mary's Churchyard, especially a recently departed beauty.

=== The Origin of the Fairies ===
First published in Blackwood's Edinburgh Magazine in 1830. The shepherd narrator tells, with wondering comments, how a knight met and fell in love with a supernatural maiden. After a year with her, he returns home an altered man, and some time later seven spirits, each with two children, arrive seeking his acknowledgment. When the knight's mother proposes a mass christening the spirits depart leaving their children as the first fairies. The knight remains unhappily between two worlds.

=== A Highland Eclogue ===
First published in The Gem for 1830; retitled 'Allan of Dale' in A Queer Book. Mary of Moy demands that her sceptical fiancé should sign an agreement promising to respect her faith. Soon after the end of the honeymoon he resumes his mockery, but within a year he is transformed and becomes even more devout than his wife.

=== Will and Sandy ===
Subtitled "A Scots Pastoral". First published in Blackwood's Edinburgh Magazine in 1829. In 1829 two shepherds argue for and against Catholic emancipation.

=== The Last Stork ===
First published in Blackwood's Edinburgh Magazine in 1830. Detaching itself from a migrating flock in Switzerland, the last stork to visit Britain is shot by a bishop and dies lamenting national public standards.

=== Superstition and Grace ===
Subtitled "An Unearthly Ballad". First published in The Bijou for 1829, with an earlier manifestation as 'The Gyre Caryl' in Hogg's Poetical Works', 1822), originally 'The Harper's Song' in Mador of the Moor', 1816)): Superstition, in the form of an old man and a band of fairies, bids farewell to the baby Grace as it withdraws from the land.

=== The Witch of the Gray Thorn ===
First published in Blackwood's Edinburgh Magazine in 1825. The priest of Inchaffery is prompted by a witch to murder the archbishop, resulting in her triumph with his execution and damnation.

=== A Greek Pastoral ===
First published in Blackwood's Edinburgh Magazine in 1830. In Thessaly a youth and maiden of matchless beauty tell each other their exchanged stories: he has been transported from Scotland by an old man, she from the east by elves. They commit themselves to each other in a pure love.

=== A Sunday Pastoral ===
First published in Blackwood's Edinburgh Magazine in 1830. Colin and Kate meet on Sunday morning, professedly on the way to church, but they are late and opt instead to spend the time on the mountain side in theological discussion and prayer, with some exchange of amorous sentiments.

=== The Perilis of Wemyng ===
Subtitled "Ane moste woeful Tragedye Compilit be Maister Hougge". First published in Blackwood's Edinburgh Magazine in 1827; retitled 'May of the Moril Glen' in The Queer Book. Hearing that a May (maiden) of Moril Glen has powers of enchantment over young men, the King of Scots decides to investigate, suspecting witchcraft, but he is himself smitten. The May says she will marry the first of her admirers to become a widower. This occasions much murdering of wives, including the Queen, prompting the shocked May to leave the country on a mysterious ship.

== Reception ==
A Queer Book received a mixed reception. Some reviewers found it 'queer' in the English sense (as opposed to the Scottish sense of 'amusing', 'funny', 'entertaining'), mocking Hogg's 'ancient stile'. But elsewhere there was appreciation of the variety and the remarkable display of fancy.
