= The Forest Minstrel =

The Forest Minstrel (1810) is an anthology of 83 songs, assembled by James Hogg, divided into four sections: 'Pathetic Songs', 'Love Songs', 'Humorous Songs', and 'National Songs'. Hogg himself is the author of 56 items. There are also 15 by Thomas Mounsey Cunningham, 5 by John Grieve, 3 by William Laidlaw, 3 by James Gray, and one perhaps by John Ballantyne.

== Background ==
In February 1810 Hogg exchanged life as a shepherd in the south of Scotland for a literary career in Edinburgh. Within weeks of his arrival he persuaded Archibald Constable to publish The Forest Minstrel. The words 'Printed for the Editor' on the title-page suggest that the publication involved a degree of authorial subsidy. Of the 56 songs by Hogg himself nearly one-third had appeared in The Scots Magazine between 1803 and 1808. Most of these were revised for the new publication, with a tendency to tone down their rural localism, colloquialism, and earthiness to make them more acceptable for polite readers and performers: 'The Forest Minstrel is meant for the young lady at her piano'.

== Editions ==
Until 2006 the only edition of The Forest Minstrel as a collected set of songs was that published in Edinburgh on 4 August 1810 by Archibald Constable and Co. with the title The Forest Minstrel; A Selection of Songs, adapted to the most favourite Scottish airs. Few of them ever before published. By James Hogg The Ettrick Shepherd, and others. The contents were as follows (by Hogg unless otherwise indicated):

- Preface
- Pathetic songs
  - 'The Soldier's Widow'
  - 'The Beggar' (by Cunningham, first published in The Scots Magazine in 1805)
  - 'The Flower'
  - 'The Moon Was A-Waining'
  - 'Mary at her Lover's Grave' (first published in The Scots Magazine in 1806)
  - 'Lament for W. Allan' (by Cunningham, first published in The Scots Magazine in 1805)
  - 'Lucy's Flittin' ' (by Laidlaw)
  - 'Bonny Dundee' (first published in The Scots Magazine in 1804)
  - 'Julia's Grave' (by Cunningham, first published in The Scots Magazine in 1807)
  - 'My Peggy an' I'
  - 'Cauld is the Blast'
  - 'The Gloamin' ' (first published in The Scots Magazine in 1805, then in The Mountain Bard in 1807)
  - 'The Braes of Ballahun' (by Cunningham, first published in The Scots Magazine in 1805)
  - 'The Unco Grave' (by Cunningham, first published in The Scots Magazine in 1806)
  - 'Alake for the Lassie!' (by Laidlaw)
  - 'Lord Eglinton's Auld Man'
  - 'Lament for Julia' (by Cunningham, first published in The Scots Magazine in 1807)
  - 'The Guardian Angel' (first published in The Scots Magazine in 1808)
  - 'Beware, Ah! Gentle Maiden' (by John Gray)
- Love songs
  - 'Bonny Mary'
  - 'My Blythe an' Bonny Lassie'
  - 'The Braes of Bushby' (first published in The Scots Magazine in 1807)
  - 'Blythe an' Cheery' (first published in The Scots Magazine in 1803)
  - 'Caroline' (by Grieve, first published in The North British Magazine and Review in 1804)
  - 'To Miss Jane S——'
  - 'The Bonny Lass of Deloraine' (first published in The Scots Magazine in 1807)
  - 'The Hills o' Gallowa' (by Cunningham, first published in The Scots Magazine in 1806)
  - 'Her Blue Rollin' E'e' (by Grieve, first published in The North British Magazine and Review in 1804)
  - 'I Hae Lost My Jeany, O'
  - 'Here, Fix'd By Choice'
  - I'm Gane A' Wrang, Jamie'
  - 'The Hay-Makers' (first published in The Scots Magazine in 1805)
  - 'The Maid of Devon' (by Grieve, first published in The North British Magazine and Review in 1804)
  - 'Avon Banks' (by Cunningham, first published in The Scots Magazine in 1807)
  - 'Lovely Mary' (by Grieve, first published in The Scots Magazine in 1803)
  - 'The Bogles'
  - 'Bonny Jean' (first published in The Scots Magazine in 1803)
  - 'Strathfillan' (by John Gray)
  - 'Bonny Leezy'
  - 'Now Well May I'
  - 'The Sheep Sheering'
  - 'How Foolish Are Mankind'
  - 'Her Bonny Black E'e' (by Laidlaw, first published in The Edinburgh Magazine in 1802)
  - 'My Dear Little Jeany'
  - 'The Exile' (by John Gray)
- Humorous songs
  - 'Doctor Monro'
  - 'Love's Like a Dizziness'
  - 'Lucky Reid' (by Cunningham, first published in The Scots Magazine in 1805)
  - 'Auld Ettrick John' (first published in The Scots Magazine in 1804)
  - 'Bonny Beety'
  - 'Ayont the Mow Amang the Hay' (probably by Cunningham, first published in The Scots Magazine in 1805)
  - 'The Drinkin', O; A Sang for the Ladies' (first published in The Scots Magazine in 1805)
  - 'Gracie Miller'
  - 'Cannie Wi' Your Blinkin', Bessie' (by Cunningham, first published in The Scots Magazine in 1806)
  - 'Birniebouzle'
  - 'Life is a Weary Cobble o' Care'
  - 'Jock an' His Mother'
  - 'Athol Cummers'
  - 'Willie Wastle'
  - 'Haverel Willie' (by Cunningham, first published in The Scots Magazine in 1805)
  - 'Auld John Borthick'
- National songs
  - 'Lament for Abercrombie' (by Cunningham, first published in The Scots Magazine in 1805)
  - 'Bauldy Fraser' (first published in The Scots Magazine in 1805)
  - 'Scotia's Glens' (first published in The Scots Magazine in 1803)
  - 'The Jubilee'
  - 'Fareweel, Ye Streams' (by Cunningham, first published in The Scots Magazine in 1805)
  - 'The Auld Highlandman'
  - 'Buccleuch's Birth-Day'
  - 'Highland Harry Back Again' (first published in The Scots Magazine in 1807)
  - 'Hap an' Rowe the Feetie O't' (first published in The Scots Magazine in 1804)
  - 'Born, Laddie' (first published in The Scots Magazine in 1803)
  - 'Donald Macdonald' (first published as a broadside sheet c. 1803)
  - 'By a Bush' (first published in The Edinburgh Magazine in 1803)
  - 'Culloden, or Lochiel's Farewell' (by Grieve)
  - 'Prince Owen and the Seer' (first published in The Scots Magazine in 1807)
  - 'Song for the Anniversary of Mr Pitt's Birth' (possibly by John Ballantyne)
  - 'My Native Isle'
  - 'Honest Duncan'
  - 'Highland Laddie'
  - 'Bannockburn' (by Cunningham)
  - 'The Emigrant'
  - 'The British Tar'
  - 'Caledonia'

Although The Forest Minstrel was not published again during Hogg's lifetime a third of his own contributions appeared, often with substantial revision, in either his 1822 Poetical Works or Songs by the Ettrick Shepherd (1831), or in both.

A critical edition of The Forest Minstrel, edited by P. D. Garside and Richard D. Jackson, was published by Edinburgh University Press in 2006 as Volume 19 in The Stirling/South Carolina Research Edition of The Collected Works of James Hogg. The editors provide music wherever possible, though in 1810 only the titles of tunes were given.

== Reception ==
The Forest Minstrel attracted only two reviews. That in The Scots Magazine valued 'the plainness, and even rudeness of the language' combined with 'loftiness' of thought, but had reservations about the compatibility of Hogg's old simple style with a new 'taste for rich and artificial ornament'. The Critical Review had essentially the same complaint, but was more socially aggressive and found Hogg's originality forced and tasteless.
