= Tales of the Wars of Montrose =

Scottish tale

Tales of the Wars of Montrose is a set of six fictional narratives by James Hogg published in 1835. Each of them centres on the fortunes of an individual in Scotland in the Wars of the Three Kingdoms during the 1640s.

The tales vary considerably in the social status of the characters depicted. Some Remarkable Passages in the Life of An Edinburgh Baillie. Written by himself is written in the style of an autobiography, covering decades in the life of its main character. A Protestant allies himself to the Catholic George Gordon, 1st Marquess of Huntly and saves Huntly's life on two occasions. After his ally's death, the man becomes a mortal enemy of the heir George Gordon, 2nd Marquess of Huntly, and he is driven primarily by an obsessive vendetta. In The Adventures of Colonel Peter Aston, a woman's father and her love interest are enemies. She keeps trying to prevent them from harming each other, and she is eventually killed while trying to break up their last fight. In Julia M,Kenzie, a supposedly infertile noblewoman is targeted for murder by the men of her husband's clan. After surviving the ordeal, she gives birth to her first daughter. In A few remarkable Adventures of Sir Simon Brodie, James Graham, 1st Marquess of Montrose and two Royalist (Cavalier) officers use disguises to court the daughters of a "daft" (stupid or insane) knight. The girls' father soon sets out on a Quixotic military campaign which is farcical in style. In Wat Pringle o' the Yair, an old soldier and his daughter take a female war refugee and her infant son under their protection. The young woman dies, and her son is kidnapped. Several years later, the grown-up son seeks financial help from his surrogate aunt and her new husband. In Mary Montgomery, the daughter of an imprisoned Royalist is send to her relations in Scotland but falls into the hands of strangers. A series of would-be protectors serve as her legal guardians over the years, until she is old enough to marry. She is then proclaimed to be the heiress to three different earldoms.

== Background ==
Tales of the Wars of Montrose originated in 1826 when Hogg attempted to interest William Blackwood in a collection of tales to be entitled 'Lives of Eminent Men', the core of which consisted of three items with the titles (shortened) 'An Edinburgh Baillie', 'Colonel Peter Ashton' (completed on 7 January the previous year), and 'Sir Simon Brodie'. Blackwood turned the project down, and Hogg was unable to find another publisher. During the next six years he contemplated publishing the stories individually, but he did not give up on the idea of a collection, and when in 1833 he finally broke with Blackwood, on 17 June he sent the London partnership of James Cochrane and John M'Crone 'Genuine Tales of the days of Montrose' This was intended to be a single-volume publication with the three original core stories: it seems Hogg prepared fresh manuscripts, which suggests that substantial revision was involved. On 24 July Cochrane agreed to publish the collection, but he asked for additional material so that he could increase the size to two volumes, and by November 1834 Hogg had written two further tales, 'Julia M,Kenzie' and 'Wat Pringle', and the final title had been agreed. However, Cochrane (who had now parted company with M'Crone) increased his demands to three volumes, and on 13 December Hogg reluctantly sent him a sixth tale, 'Mary Montgomery', originally intended for Blackwood's Edinburgh Magazine and now superficially revised to adjust the setting from the reign of James VII to that of Charles I.

== Editions ==
Tales of the Wars of Montrose. By James Hogg, Esq., Author of "The Queen's Wake." was published in 2 volumes in London by James Cochrane and Co. in 1835.

A critical edition by Gillian Hughes appeared in 1996 as Volume 4 in The Stirling/South Carolina Research Edition of The Collected Works of James Hogg published by Edinburgh University Press. This is based on Hogg's manuscripts rather than the printed edition, and it omits 'Mary Montgomery' in conformity with Hogg's preference: Gillian Hughes had edited this in its original version as 'A Genuine Border Story By the Ettrick Shepherd' in Studies in Hogg and his World, 3 (1992), [95]‒145.

== Contents ==
=== Some Remarkable Passages in the Life of An Edinburgh Baillie. Written by himself ===
- This episodic novella, in the style of Defoe, takes the form of extracts from the autobiography of Archbald Sydeserf with quasi-editorial linking passages. An adherent of the reformed faith, Sydeserf takes up residence in the household of the Catholic Marquis of Huntly after being persuaded by Huntly's attractive daughter Jane to abstract documents incriminating her father from the archives at Edinburgh Castle which are in his keeping. When Jane marries, Sydeserf takes up service as secretary to the Protestant Marquis of Argyle and becomes a prominent baillie in Edinburgh. In 1635 he is instrumental in securing Huntly's acquittal on a further capital charge. On Huntly's natural death soon afterwards Sydeserf conceives a mortal enmity to the new Marquis, who objects to his being a substantial beneficiary of his father's will. The second half of the novella consists of a series of episodes centring on the baillie's frustrated vendetta against young Huntly with Montrose and then Argyle. His obsession is satisfied only with young Huntly's execution in 1649. The editor notes that Sydeserf died in 1661 shortly after attending Argyle on the scaffold.

=== The Adventures of Colonel Peter Aston ===
- Set in 1645, this story tells of the hostility between Peter Aston, keeper of the Aberdeenshire forests of the Earl of Mar, and the depredator Nicol Grant. Grant's daughter Marsali falls in love with Ashton and helps him to escape when her father holds him captive, on the understanding that he will not seek to kill Grant. Marsali continues to prevent Ashton and Grant from harming each other: after the Battle of Auldearn, when Ashton is promoted and Grant disgraced, Marsali (disguised as Ashton's page) dies in the course of separating the two men, but Ashton is also mortally wounded.

=== Julia M,Kenzie ===
First published as 'A Horrible Instance of the Effects of Clanship' in Blackwood's Edinburgh Magazine, 28 (October 1830), 680‒87, and substantially revised here)

- Julia, wife of Lord Edirdale, is unable to conceive the child necessary to avoid the succession of the hated Nagarre. In 1645 the chief men of the clan try to drown her, but she is rescued and returns to the castle, prompting the leading conspirator to kill himself. Happily, Julia's experiences bring about a change in her constitution, enabling her to conceive a daughter and two sons in the years following.

=== A few remarkable Adventures of Sir Simon Brodie ===
- In 1644 Montrose and two royalist officers, disguised as parliamentarians, arrive at Castle-Garl, home of the half-daft royalist Sir Simon Brodie. In a farcical episode the officers court the Brodie daughters, one of whom is a closet parliamentarian. After Montrose's departure Sir Simon sets out on a Quixotic military campaign culminating in another farcical adventure on Inch-colm in the Firth of Forth, on which he is deposited by a seal after being thrown overboard by the Marquis of Argyle following the Battle of Kilsyth (15 August 1645).

=== Wat Pringle o' the Yair ===
- Wat Pringle, an old soldier, gives General Lesley the benefit of his local knowledge before Montrose's defeat at the Battle of Philiphaugh (18 September 1645). Wat and his daughter Jenny adopt Lady Julia Hay and her baby son, refugees after the battle. When she learns that her husband and father are to be executed Julia goes mad and eventually dies. Her son is abducted by a pedlar; as a young man he seeks out Jenny, now married to her half-cousin, and her husband provides funds to settle him on part of his paternal property.

=== Mary Montgomery ===
- In 1641 Mary Montgomery's imprisoned royalist father sends her to relations in Scotland, but she is intercepted on the way by a band of moss-troopers. One of them, Jock of Thickside, takes her home, and his wife Christy transfers her to Widow Clark for her safety. She is taken up in turn by the neighbouring Lady Langley who brings her up with her son George. Intending her for a nunnery, Lady Langley passes her on to John Stewart, 1st Earl of Traquair. Both George and Traquair's second son John fall in love with her. John defeats George in a duel, but George is Mary's choice and they marry. Sir James Montgomery, Mary's guardian, arrives from Ayr and proclaims her to be heiress to three earldoms and considerable wealth.

== Reception ==
The reviewers received Tales of the Wars of Montrose with appreciation and disapproval in roughly equal measure. Hogg was praised for his story-telling power, but he was also found lacking in imagination in historical fiction, especially when it was compared with his poetry, and he was judged inferior to Walter Scott.
