= Scottish Pastorals =

Scottish Pastorals (1801), containing five poems and two songs, was the first book published by James Hogg.

== Background ==
In 1800, most likely August or September, by his own account, Hogg had time on his hands during a trip to Edinburgh to sell sheep. Aware of his poetic gift—though only one poem of his had so far appeared in print, in The Scots Magazine for 1794—he found a printer's shop next to the market, wrote out 'a poem or two' from memory, and had them printed as a 62-page booklet. This may be a true recollection, though Hogg had shown a manuscript of the collection to friends before it was published.

== Editions ==
Scottish Pastorals, Poems, Songs, &c. Mostly Written in the Dialect of the South. By James Hogg was printed in Edinburgh by John Taylor, Grassmarket. A thousand copies were printed, selling at a shilling.

In 1988 Stirling University Press published a critical edition by Elaine Petrie.

== Contents ==
Geordie Fa's Dirge

Dusty, or, Watie an' Geordie's Review of Politics; An Eclogue

Willie an' Keatie, A Pastoral

A Dialogue in a Country Church-Yard

The Death of Sir Niel Stuart, and Donald M'Vane, Esq. An Auld Tale Made New Again

Song I "'Twas up yon wild an' lonely glen"

Song II "O Shepherd, the weather is misty and changing"

== Reception ==
Scottish Pastorals received little attention when it was published. In his Memoir Hogg himself dismissed it as a vanity publication. Its merits have received recognition, however, in the later 20th and early 21st centuries. In the most detailed discussion, Elaine Petrie in her edition of 1988 praises 'the raw life and vitality that prevent it from ever becoming a precious little collection of derivative verse' and asserts that 'Hogg's confident use of Scots imbues his subjects with dignity and integrity'. Petrie's recognition of the 'vigour' and 'candour' of the collection was endorsed in 2003 by Karl Miller. Four years later, Valentina Bold responded more equivocally, finding the collection at times 'laboured' and 'insipid', but discerning 'a subtle mix of oral and artsong elements' and an ability simultaneously to adopt and subvert established forms which was to be developed richly in Hogg's subsequent works.
