= Songs, by The Ettrick Shepherd =

Songs, By the Ettrick Shepherd is a collection of 113 songs by James Hogg published in 1831. All except one of the songs had previously appeared in print, mostly either in Hogg's earlier publications or in a range of periodicals.

== Background ==
During the 1820s songs by Hogg had appeared in a number of periodicals, most notably in the Noctes Ambrosianae series in Blackwood's Edinburgh Magazine. In April 1830 Hogg announced to William Blackwood that he was selecting the best of these songs for a 'pocket volume'. In the event the choice was not limited to the previous decade: Hogg assembled songs from throughout his career, so that the volume offers a comprehensive survey of his work in the field. He was closely involved with the production of the volume between October and December, adjusting the contents and correcting the proofs, although his nephew Robert played a minor part in the process. In preparing the volume, Hogg provided most of the songs with short explanatory headnotes. The contents are presented as a miscellany rather than with any formal categorisation.

== Editions ==
Songs, by The Ettrick Shepherd. Now first collected, published by William Blackwood in Edinburgh and T[homas] Cadell in London, appeared at the beginning of January 1831. The print run was 1500.

A critical edition, by Kirsteen McCue with Janette Currie, appeared in 2014 as Volume 28 in the Stirling/South Carolina Research Edition of The Collected Works of James Hogg, published by Edinburgh University Press.

== Reception ==
The reviewers gave the volume an overwhelmingly favourable reception. Hogg was seen as a worthy successor of Burns, and the headnotes were found entertaining and informative. The final sentence of the review in The Literary Gazette may be regarded as representative of the general verdict: 'This volume will greatly raise the poet in the estimation of England, which is too apt to mistake him for a Noctesian roisterer, and, though an imaginative, a sometimes coarse prose writer.'
