= A Series of Lay Sermons =

Moral and religious discourses by James Hogg, 1834

A Series of Lay Sermons is a set of eleven moral and religious discourses by James Hogg published in 1834.

== Background ==
Information on the genesis of A Series of Lay Sermons is virtually non-existent. It seems that Hogg wrote them in 1833, envisaging that they would appear in London under the imprint of James Fraser, who published Fraser's Magazine from its foundation in 1830. After Hogg had parted company with William Blackwood at the end of 1831 Fraser's provided a welcome home for his short prose works and single poems, replacing Blackwood's Edinburgh Magazine. Hogg also had a difference of opinion with Fraser in the later part of 1833, but they settled their disagreement in November, and it must have been either in the first part of the year or at the end that he sent Fraser the Lay Sermons. On 25 January 1834 Hogg noted that the work was in the press.

== Editions ==
A Series of Lay Sermons on Good Principles and Good Breeding was published in London on 19 April 1834 by James Fraser. There were no further editions until a critical edition by Gillian Hughes appeared in 1997 as Volume 5 in the Stirling/South Carolina Research Edition of The Collected Works of James Hogg published by Edinburgh University Press.

== Contents ==
Sermon I. Good Principles [ensuring a fulfilled old age]

Sermon II. Young Women

Sermon III. Good Breeding [in social conversation]

Sermon IV. Soldiers

Sermon V. To Young Men

Sermon VI. Reason and Instinct

Sermon VII. To Parents

Sermon VIII. Virtue the Only Source of Happiness

Sermon IX. Marriage

Sermon X. Reviewers

Sermon XI. Deistical Reformers

== Reception ==
A Series of Lay Sermons met with an enthusiastic reception from the reviewers, especially for their good sense. The odd one out was Fraser's Magazine, modelled on Blackwood's Edinburgh Magazine, which produced a mischievous mocking demolition.
