= Noctes Ambrosianae =

Series of colloquies published 1822 - 1835

The Noctes Ambrosianae, a series of 71 imaginary colloquies, appeared in Blackwood's Magazine from 1822 to 1835. The earlier ones had several different authors, including John Gibson Lockhart, William Maginn, James Hogg and Professor John Wilson, but from 1826, with the 19th in the series, the contributions by Wilson predominate, and he eventually wrote all or most of 39 of the dialogues, as well as parts of some others.

The scene is usually set in Ambrose's Tavern in Edinburgh, and the central characters are "Christopher North" (Wilson himself), "Timothy Tickler" (based on Robert Sym, 1750–1840, a Writer to the Signet), and the "Ettrick Shepherd" (based on James Hogg). Several other characters, imaginary or based on real people, including the "English Opium Eater" (Thomas De Quincey) and "The tailor o' Yarrow Ford" (David Brunton) occur in some episodes. The series is particularly noted for the expressive Scots dialogue of the Ettrick Shepherd.
