= The Mountain Bard =

Collection of poems

The Mountain Bard (1807), containing 21 poems, was James Hogg's first substantial poetical publication.

== Editions ==
=== The first edition ===
The Mountain Bard; consisting of Ballads and Songs, founded on facts and legendary tales. By James Hogg, The Ettrick Shepherd was first published in Edinburgh in February 1807 by Archibald Constable and Co. and in London by John Murray. Hogg had had seven poems printed privately in 1801 as Scottish Pastorals, and several of his poems had been published separately in The Scots Magazine and The Edinburgh Magazine. For The Mountain Bard he revised his earlier texts, with input from Walter Scott, making them more refined for a polite readership. The first edition of The Mountain Bard contains an introductory memoir and 21 poems, ten of them 'Ballads, in Imitation of the Antients', and the other eleven 'Songs Adapted to the Times' (though only seven of them are actually songs). The ballads are:

- 'Sir David Græme' (first published in The Scots Magazine in 1805)
- 'The Pedlar' (first published in The Scots Magazine in 1804)
- 'Gilmanscleuch'
- 'The Fray of Elibank'
- 'Mess John'
- 'The Death of Douglas, Lord of Liddisdale' (first published in The Scots Magazine in 1804)
- 'Willie Wilkin'
- 'Thirlestane: A Fragment'
- 'Lord Derwent: A Fragment'
- 'The Laird of Lairistan'

The poems in the second section are:

- 'Sandy Tod: A Scottish Pastoral' (first published in The Edinburgh Magazine in 1802)
- 'A Farewell to Ettrick' (first published in The Scots Magazine in 1804 as 'Jamie's Farewell to Etttrick')
- 'Love Abused' (first published in The Scots Magazine in 1805)
- 'Epistle to Mr T. M. C., London' (first published in The Scots Magazine in 1805)
- 'Scotia's Glens'
- 'Donald Macdonald' (first published as a song-sheet probably in 1803)
- 'The Author's Address to his Auld Dog Hector' (first published in The Scots Magazine in 1805 as 'A Shepherd's Address to his Auld Dog Hector')
- 'The Bonnets o' Bonny Dundee' (first published in The Scots Magazine in 1804)
- 'Auld Ettrick John' (first published in The Scots Magazine in 1804)
- 'The Hay Making' (first published in The Scots Magazine in 1805)
- 'Bonny Jean' (first published in The Scots Magazine in 1803)

=== The third edition ===
There was no second edition of The Mountain Bard, but the first edition appeared in two formats. The third edition was published in Edinburgh on 19 February 1821 by Oliver & Boyd as The Mountain Bard; consisting of Legendary Ballads and Tales. Hogg provided the volume, which he intended to form part of a Collected Works, with an extended, updated version of the memoir. He retained the ten ballads from the first edition and (concluding the volume) three of the poems from its second section, with revisions again often in the direction of refinement:

- 'Sandy Tod: A Scottish Pastoral'
- 'Farewell to Ettrick'
- 'The Author's Address to his Auld Dog Hector'

Before this concluding trio Hogg inserted four poems not included in the 1807 edition:

- 'The Wife of Crowle' (first published in Hogg's periodical The Spy in 1810 as 'A Fragment')
- 'The Lairde of Kirkmabreeke' (a ballad satirical of medieval chivalry)
- 'The Tweeddale Raide' (a ballad by Robert Hogg, James's nephew)
- 'Robin an' Nanny' (a very early rural ballad)

With the exception of 'Epistle to Mr T. M. C., London' the remaining poems from the second section of the 1807 edition had been included in The Forest Minstrel (1810), and most of them reappeared in Songs by the Ettrick Shepherd (1831).

=== Standard critical edition ===
The standard modern critical edition, by Suzanne Gilbert (2007), occupies Volume 20 in the Stirling/South Carolina Research Edition of The Collected Works of James Hogg, published by Edinburgh University Press.

== Reception ==
The 1807 edition received nine reviews. In general the critics were well-disposed to Hogg as a rustic genius like Robert Burns. Typical is The Poetical Register: 'Mr. Hogg is the poet of the Shepherds; and is really an honour to them. Shepherds, be it remembered, were always a poetical tribe. The Ballads of Mr. Hogg are in the true style of that sort of writing. They are simple and natural, and contain many spirited and picturesque ideas and descriptions, and, occasionally, strokes of genuine humour. The songs also are good.' The reviews of the 1821 volume were mostly much less favourable than those of the first edition, Hogg's expanded memoir with its disconcertingly frank account of his experience of literary Edinburgh coming in for particular adverse criticism from the Scottish periodicals.
