= John Grieve (poet) =

Scottish poet (1781–1836)

John Grieve (12 September 1781 – 4 April 1836), was a Scottish poet.

== Early pursuits ==
John, son of the Rev. Walter Grieve, minister of the Reformed Presbyterian Church, was born at Dunfermline on 12 Sept. 1781. He was educated at the parish school of Ettrick, where his father had settled on retiring from the ministry. After leaving school he was first a merchant's clerk in Alloa, and then acted for some time as a bank clerk in Greenock; he returned to Alloa, however, to become a partner in the firm of his former employer. In 1804, he began business in Edinburgh, in partnership with Mr. Chalmers Izzet, hat-maker.

== He becomes a writer ==
Here he was successful, and found leisure for literary pursuits. He contributed to various periodicals, his most notable efforts being the songs which he wrote for the Forest Minstrel of James Hogg. He was on intimate terms with Hogg, who speaks of his literary advice as well as his material assistance. Hogg's Madoc of the Moor is dedicated to him, and he figures as a competing minstrel in the Queen's Wake.

It was on Grieve's recommendation that the Queen's Wake was published, and in regard to the more generous support given him by Grieve and his partner, Hogg says that without this he could never have fought his way in Edinburgh:

"I was fairly starved into it, and if it had not been for Messrs. Grieve and Scott would in a very short time have been starved out of it again."

In 1817, Grieve retired from business through ill-health. Until his death he was a well-known figure in Edinburgh literary society. He died unmarried on 4 April 1836, and was buried in St. Mary's, Yarrow.
