= Familiar Anecdotes of Sir Walter Scott =

Literature

Familiar Anecdotes of Sir Walter Scott, a memoir by James Hogg, was published in New York in 1834.

== Background ==
The origins of Familiar Anecdotes can be traced back to an article by Hogg which appeared in The Edinburgh Literary Journal on 27 June 1829. Towards the end of the article Hogg anticipated producing a more extended portrait if Scott pre-deceased himself. He was prompted to compose this longer essay, entitled 'Anecdotes of Sir W. Scott', when he received a visit from the London publisher John M'Crone shortly after Scott's death in the autumn of 1832, sending the manuscript south at the beginning of March 1833. In the event the essay in its original form did not see the light of day until 1983, when it appeared in an edition by Douglas S. Mack published at Edinburgh by the Scottish Academic Press. John Gibson Lockhart raised objections, asserting that he ought to have been given an opportunity to ask Hogg to omit 'things that would give pain to his [Scott's] children' and Hogg, offended in his turn, asked M'Crone to return the manuscript. However, in June 1833 Hogg agreed to entrust the work to Harper and Brothers in New York: for this purpose he prepared a fresh, substantially revised manuscript, with some new material, much reordering, and continuous small adjustments. Hogg's new manuscript was censored and toned down by the American editor.

== Editions ==
Familiar Anecdotes of Sir Walter Scott. By James Hogg, The Ettrick Shepherd was published in April 1834 at New York by Harper & Brothers. The first half of the volume was devoted to 'Sketch of the Shepherd's Life' by S. De Witt Bloodgood. A pirated version, The Domestic Manners and Private Life of Sir Walter Scott, was published by John Reid & Co. at Glasgow in June: this included footnotes by an unknown hand denigratory of Scott and Hogg.

A critical edition by Jill Rubenstein appeared in 1999 as Volume 7 in The Stirling/South Carolina Research Edition of The Collected Works of James Hogg published by Edinburgh University Press. Entitled Anecdotes of Scott this includes the original Anecdotes of Sir W. Scott and Familiar Anecdotes of Sir Walter Scott, taking Hogg's two manuscripts as copy texts.
