= James Hogg =

Scottish poet and novelist (1770–1835)

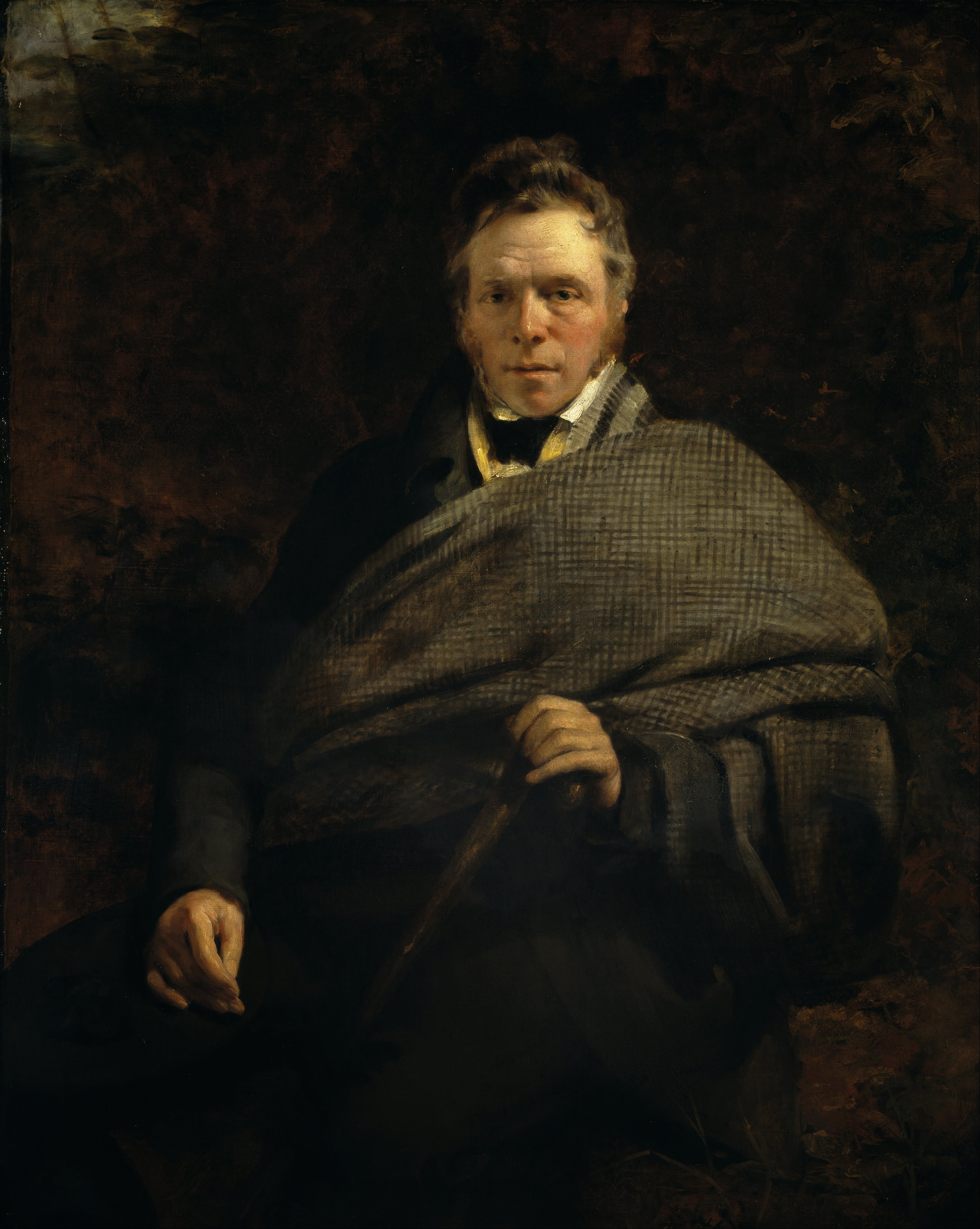
- Portrait by John Watson Gordon, 1830
- Born: before 9 December 1770; Ettrick, Selkirkshire, Scotland
- Died: 21 November 1835 (aged 64–65); Ettrick, Selkirkshire, Scotland
- Occupations: Novelist; essayist; poet; biographer; journalist
- Spouse: Margaret Phillips (m. 1820)
- Children: Elizabeth; James; Harriet; Jessie; Margaret; Mary; Catherine
- Relatives: Margaret Laidlaw (mother)
- Writing career
- Period: 1794–1835
- Notable work: The Private Memoirs and Confessions of a Justified Sinner

James Hogg (1770 – 21 November 1835) was a Scottish poet, novelist and essayist who wrote in both Scots and English. As a young man he worked as a shepherd and farmhand, and was largely self-educated through reading. He was a friend of many of the great writers of his day, including Sir Walter Scott, of whom he later wrote an unauthorised biography. He became widely known as the "Ettrick Shepherd", a nickname under which some of his works were published, and the character name he was given in the widely read series Noctes Ambrosianae, published in Blackwood's Magazine. He is best known today for his novel The Private Memoirs and Confessions of a Justified Sinner. His other works include the long poem The Queen's Wake (1813), his collection of songs Jacobite Relics (1819), and his two novels The Three Perils of Man (1822), and The Three Perils of Woman (1823).

== Biography ==
=== Early life ===
James Hogg was born on a small farm near Ettrick, Selkirkshire, Scotland in 1770 and was baptised there on 9 December, his actual date of birth having never been recorded. His father, Robert Hogg (1729–1820), was a tenant farmer while his mother, Margaret Hogg (née Laidlaw) (1730–1813), was noted for collecting native Scottish ballads. Margaret Laidlaw's father, known as Will o' Phawhope, was said to have been the last man in the Border country to speak with the fairies. James was the second eldest of four brothers, his siblings being William, David, and Robert (from eldest to youngest). Robert and David later emigrated to the United States, while James and William remained in Scotland for their entire lives.

James attended a parish school for a few months before his education was stopped due to his father's bankruptcy as a stock-farmer and sheep-dealer. Robert Hogg was then given the position of shepherd at Ettrickhouse farm by one of his neighbours. James worked as a farm servant throughout his childhood, tending cows, doing general farm work, and acting as a shepherd's assistant. His early experiences of literature and story telling came from the Bible and his mother's and uncle's stories. In 1784 he purchased a fiddle with money that he had saved, and taught himself how to play it. In 1785 he served a year working for a tenant farmer at Singlee. In 1786 he went to work for Mr. Laidlaw of Ellibank, staying with him for eighteen months. In 1788 he was given his first job as a shepherd by Laidlaw's father, a farmer at Willenslee. He stayed here for two years, learning to read while tending sheep, and being given newspapers and theological works by his employer's wife.

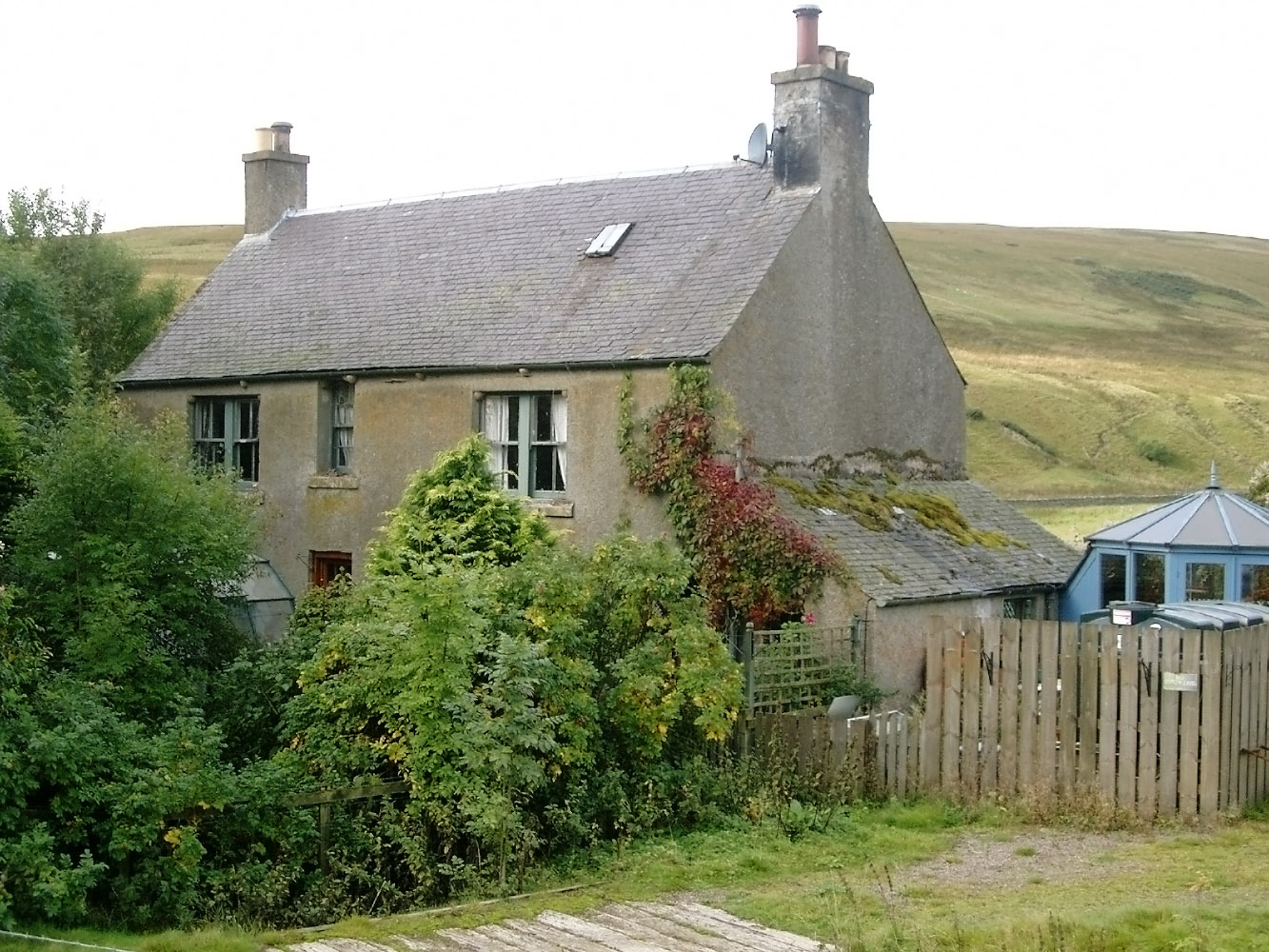
The farmhouse at Blackhouse, where Hogg worked as a young man

In 1790 he began ten years of service to James Laidlaw of Blackhouse in the Yarrow valley. Hogg later said that Laidlaw was more like a father to him than an employer. Seeing how hard he was working to improve himself, Laidlaw offered to help by making books available for Hogg from his own library, and through a local lending library. Hogg also began composing songs to be sung by local girls. He became a lifelong friend of his master's son, William Laidlaw, himself a minor writer and later the amanuensis of Walter Scott. It was at this time that Hogg, his eldest brother, and several cousins, formed a debating society of shepherds.

Hogg first became familiar with the work of the recently deceased Robert Burns in 1797, after having the poem Tam o' Shanter read to him. During this period Hogg wrote plays and pastorals, and continued producing songs. His work as a sheep drover stimulated an interest in the Scottish Highlands. In 1800 he left Blackhouse to help take care of his parents at Ettrickhouse. Early in 1801 he published a booklet Scottish Pastorals. His patriotic song "Donald Macdonald", printed as a broadside probably in 1803, achieved considerable popularity.

=== Career ===
In 1801 Hogg was recruited to collect ballads for Walter Scott's collection Minstrelsy of the Scottish Border. He met Scott himself the following year and began working for the Edinburgh Magazine. In the summer of 1802 he embarked on the first of three tours of the Highlands with a view to securing a farm of his own. He eventually found a farm on Harris but due to trouble with his finances and a legal issue he was unable to secure a lease by 1804. He may not have been really committed to the project in any case. His experiences on his Highland tours were described in letters to Scott which were published in the Scots Magazine. On his way back to Ettrickhouse in 1803 he dined with the novelist John Galt in Greenock. In 1805–06 he worked as a shepherd in Dumfriesshire, meeting the poet Allan Cunningham and becoming friends with him and his family. In October 1806 he became the lover of a young woman named Catherine Henderson, and in the same autumn he attempted unsuccessfully to establish himself as an independent farmer.

Hogg's first collection, The Mountain Bard, was published in February 1807 by Constable. At the end of summer 1807 his daughter by Catherine Henderson was born, baptised on 13 December as Catherine Hogg. In 1837 she married David Lauder and they named their son James Hogg Lauder. Catherine Henderson herself went on to marry David Laidlaw in 1812. Hogg continued working as a sheep-grazer for other farmers, but his debts began to grow throughout 1808–1809. At the end of 1809 he began an affair with Margaret Beattie, and soon after absconded from his creditors, returning in disgrace to Ettrick.

In 1810 Hogg moved to Edinburgh to start a literary career. In March 1810 his daughter by Margaret Beattie was born, christened Elizabeth Hogg in June. At the end of 1810 he met his future wife Margaret Phillips. His magazine The Spy, begun in 1810, ended after a year. At this time he became a founder member of a debating society called The Forum, eventually serving as its secretary. In 1812 he composed a long poetical work. The Queen's Wake (the setting of which was the return to Scotland of Mary, Queen of Scots in 1561 after her exile in France) was published early in 1813 and was a success. It was, in the guise of a competition, a collection of verse tales, of which Kilmeny became and remained the best known. At the end of 1813 Hogg began writing a narrative poem Mador of the Moor set in the central Highlands; he completed it the spring of 1814 but it was not published for another two years.

In 1814 Hogg completed a visionary poetic narrative The Pilgrims of the Sun in three weeks, and in the same year he met William Wordsworth and made a visit to the Lake District to see Wordsworth and other poets. In 1815 the Duke of Buccleuch granted him a small farm at Eltrive Moss, where he could live rent-free for his lifetime. He continued to write songs and poems, including "The Field of Waterloo" and "To the Ancient Banner of Buccleuch". His poem Mador of the Moor was published in 1816. Later in the year he published his collection of parodies The Poetic Mirror, achieving a marked success.

An oil painting of Hogg

Hogg first met the publisher William Blackwood in the aftermath of his own publisher John Goldie's 1814 bankruptcy, and in 1817 he helped with the start of Blackwood's Edinburgh Monthly Magazine. He published his two volume collection Dramatic Tales in May. In 1818 his collection The Brownie of Bodsbeck; and Other Tales was published by Blackwood. This work utilized genuine Scottish folklore which Hogg had collected. At this time Hogg was busy with his work Jacobite Relics. In 1819 he proposed marriage to Margaret Phillips. At the end of the year he published the first volume of Jacobite Relics. He married Margaret Phillips on 28 April 1820. His second tales collection Winter Evening Tales was published a month later. At the end of the year his father died. The second volume of Jacobite Relics was published in February 1821, and his son James Robert Hogg was born in March 1821. Around this time, Hogg began having serious financial problems.

It was through the Edinburgh Monthly Magazine, soon renamed Blackwood's Magazine, that Hogg found fame, although it was not the sort that he wanted. Launched as a counter-blast to the Whig Edinburgh Review, Blackwood wanted punchy content in his new publication. He found his ideal contributors in John Wilson (who wrote as Christopher North) and John Gibson Lockhart (later Walter Scott's son-in-law and biographer). Their first published article, "The Chaldee Manuscript", a thinly disguised satire of Edinburgh society in biblical language which Hogg started and Wilson and Lockhart elaborated, was so controversial that Wilson fled and Blackwood was forced to apologise. Soon Blackwood's Tory views and reviews – often scurrilous attacks on other writers – were notorious, and the magazine, or "Maga" as it came to be known, had become one of the best-selling journals of its day.

But Hogg quickly found himself forced out of the inner circle. As other writers such as Walter Maginn and Thomas de Quincey joined, he became not merely excluded from the lion's share of publication in Maga, but a figure of fun in its pages. Wilson and Lockhart were dangerous friends. Hogg's Memoirs of the Author's Life were savagely attacked by an anonymous reviewer, causing Hogg to temporarily break with Blackwood's, and go to work for Constable's smaller Edinburgh Magazine.

In 1822 the Maga launched the Noctes Ambrosianae or "Nights at Ambrose's", imaginary conversations in a drinking-den between semi-fictional characters such as North, O'Doherty, The Opium Eater and the Ettrick Shepherd. The Shepherd was Hogg. The Noctes continued until 1834, and were written after 1825 mostly by Wilson, although other writers, including Hogg himself, had a hand in them. The Shepherd of the Noctes is a part-animal, part-rural simpleton, and part-savant. He became one of the best-known figures in topical literary affairs, famous throughout Britain and its colonies. Quite what the real James Hogg made of this is mostly unknown, although some of his letters to Blackwood and others express outrage and anguish.

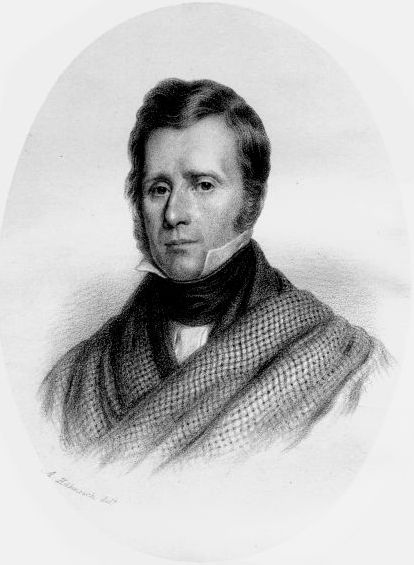
An etching of Hogg

Hogg's Poetical Works in four volumes were published in 1822, as was his novel The Three Perils of Man. In 1823, in debt to Blackwood, Hogg began publishing his work The Shepherd's Calendar in Blackwood's Edinburgh Magazine. Hogg's daughter Jessie was born in April, and later in the year he published his novel The Three Perils of Woman. In June 1824 he published his best known work, the novel The Private Memoirs and Confessions of a Justified Sinner. His epic poem Queen Hynde was published at the end of the year. In 1825 he found a new and lucrative market for his works as he began publishing in a literary annual called the Literary Souvenir.

In 1825 Hogg's daughter Maggie was born, and he began writing a new prose work, later titled Tales of the Wars of Montrose. In 1826 Hogg was in serious trouble with his debts, while the firm of Constable collapsed, involving Walter Scott and Hogg's friend John Aiken. In 1827 his debts began to lighten as his Shepherd's Calendar pieces were being published, and he was getting more and more applications to contribute to annuals. The death of his father-in-law, whose family Hogg had been supporting, gave him relief. His third daughter Harriet was born at the end of the year. Hogg's collection Select and Rare Scottish Melodies was published in 1829, and he continued to write songs and contribute to annuals throughout 1828–1829, while The Shepherd's Calendar was published in book form in Spring, 1829.

=== Later life ===
In 1830 he started publishing in the new Fraser's Magazine, which helped to alleviate a further financial crisis, and at the end of the year he met with Walter Scott for the last time. In early 1831 Hogg's Songs, by The Ettrick Shepherd was published, but the publishing of the companion volume A Queer Book was held up by Blackwood. Hogg's last child, his daughter Mary, was born in August. At the end of the year he quarrelled with Blackwood, and decided to publish his works in London. In 1832 his Altrive Tales was published in London, while Blackwood finally published A Queer Book in April or May. Hogg was offered a large sum to edit a collection of the works of Robert Burns, but the bankruptcy of his London publisher stopped the publication of his Altrive Tales after the first of the twelve projected volumes.

In 1833 Hogg had an accident while curling, falling through the ice, causing a serious illness. In 1834 his biographical work Familiar Anecdotes of Sir Walter Scott was published in the United States, while a pirated version published in Glasgow led to a break with Lockhart. Hogg mended his relationship with Blackwood in May, but Blackwood died at the end of the year. Hogg published Tales of the Wars of Montrose in March 1835.

=== Death ===
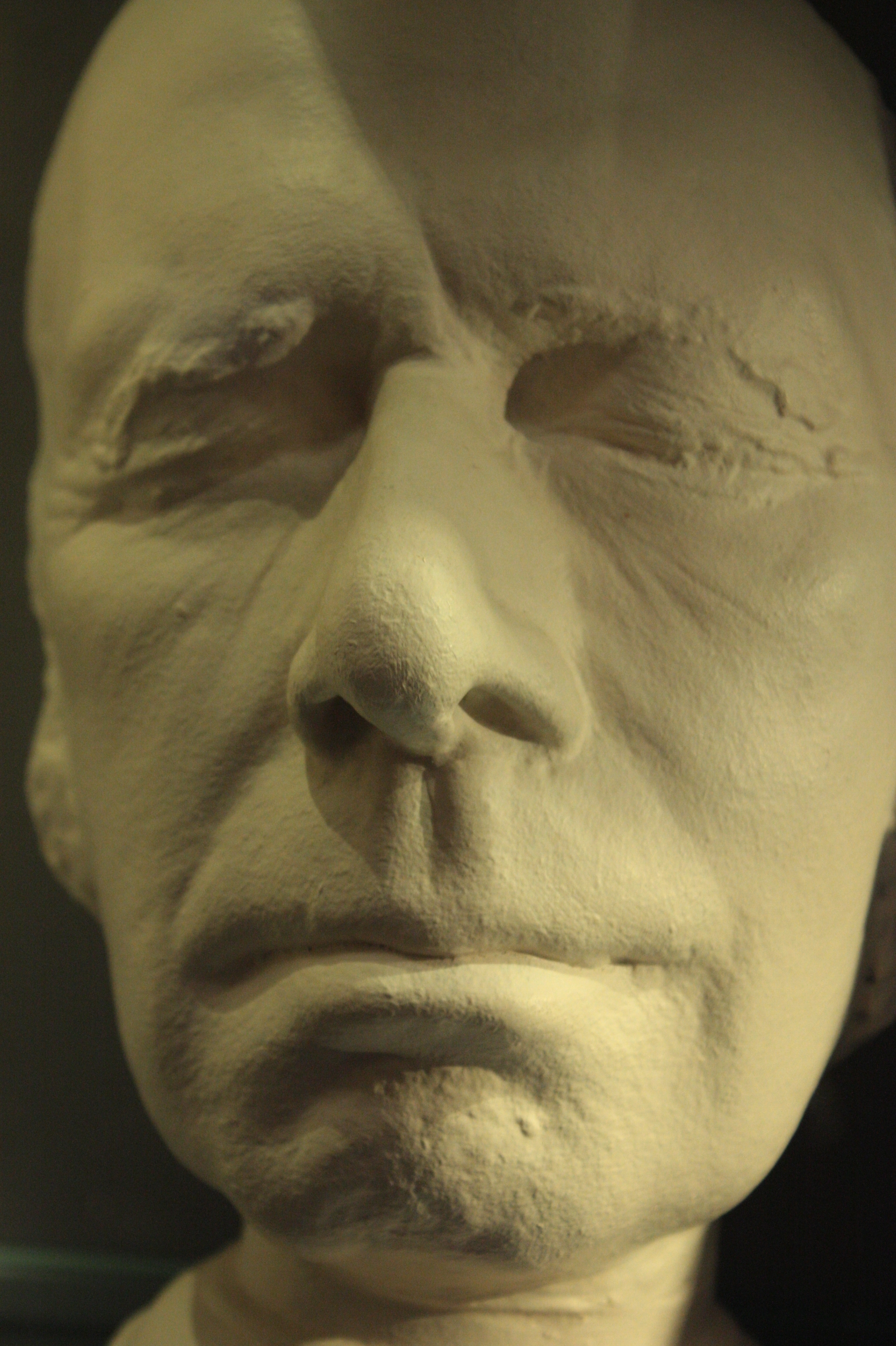
A live head cast of Hogg

James Hogg died on 21 November 1835 and was buried in Ettrick Churchyard, close to his childhood home in the Scottish Borders. In 2021, it was reported that his grave had been preemptively toppled by Scottish Borders Council out of safety concerns and that independent restoration efforts were planned by the community.

Wordsworth's "Extempore Effusion upon the Death of James Hogg", written on 30 November, nine days after Hogg's death, includes the lines:

The mighty Minstrel breathes no longer,
'Mid mouldering ruins low he lies;
And death upon the braes of Yarrow,
Has closed the Shepherd-poet's eyes.

This eulogy notwithstanding, Wordsworth's notes state "He was undoubtedly a man of original genius, but of coarse manners and low and offensive opinions."

== Legacy ==
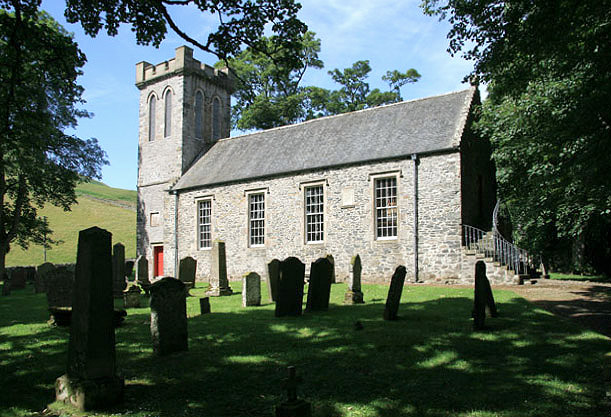
Ettrick Parish Church, where Hogg is buried

Among the reading public at large Hogg was, during his lifetime, one of the most admired writers of the day, but this admiration was largely for his success in overcoming the disadvantages of his peasant birth and lack of education. He was considered a man of great natural genius whose uncouth style and subject-matter, so natural for the clownish figure depicted in the Noctes Ambrosianae, should not be held against him. A collected edition of his works was published in the 1830s, after Hogg's death, pruned of some passages which offended the increasing delicacy of the age, and another Works of the Ettrick Shepherd was prepared in the 1860s which took the process even further; some works, for example The Three Perils of Woman, were excluded altogether. Victorian readers of these emasculated texts naturally came to the conclusion that Hogg had been overrated, and that he was notable mainly as an example of triumph over adverse circumstances. Apart from Justified Sinner, which even his detractors acknowledged as unusually powerful (and often attributed to someone else, usually Lockhart), his novels were regarded as turgid, his verse as light, his short tales and articles as ephemera.

This situation only began to change in 1924, when the French writer André Gide was loaned Justified Sinner by Raymond Mortimer. Gide was amazed, writing that "It is long since I can remember being so taken hold of, so voluptuously tormented by any book." Its republication in 1947, with an enthusiastic introduction by Gide, helped bring about the modern critical and academic appreciation of this novel. Growing interest in The Confessions led to the rediscovery and reconsideration of his other work in the late 20th and early 21st centuries. Now his novel The Three Perils of Woman is also considered a classic and all his work, including his letters, is undergoing major publication in the Stirling/South Carolina editions. However, Justified Sinner remains his most important work and is now seen as one of the major Scottish novels of its time, and absolutely crucial in terms of exploring one of the key themes of Scottish culture and identity: Calvinism. In a 2006 interview with Melvyn Bragg for ITV1, Scottish novelist Irvine Welsh cited Hogg, especially The Confessions as a major influence on his writing. A James Hogg Society was founded in 1981 to encourage the study of his life and writings. Hogg's story "The Brownie of the Black Haggs" was dramatised for BBC Radio 4 in 2003 by Scottish playwright Marty Ross as part of his "Darker Side of the Border" series. More recently Ross returned to the villain of that story, Merodach, making him the villain of a Doctor Who audiobook, Night's Black Agents (Big Finish Productions 2010), in which this demonic figure assumes the pose of a Minister of the Kirk.

Thomas Wilson's Opera, The Confessions of a Justified Sinner (1972–75), commissioned by Scottish Opera, is based on the novel. British composer Audrey Piggott (b 1906) used Hogg’s text in her composition “Boy’s Song.”

A bill he issued to purchase £50 worth of lambs in 1824 is exhibited in the Museum on the Mound, Edinburgh.

Hogg is an indirect ancestor of Nobel Prize-winning Canadian writer Alice Munro.

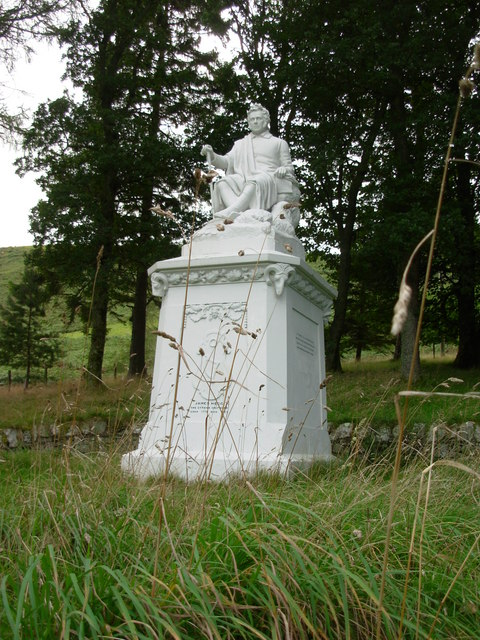
A monument to Hogg at St Mary's Loch by Andrew Currie

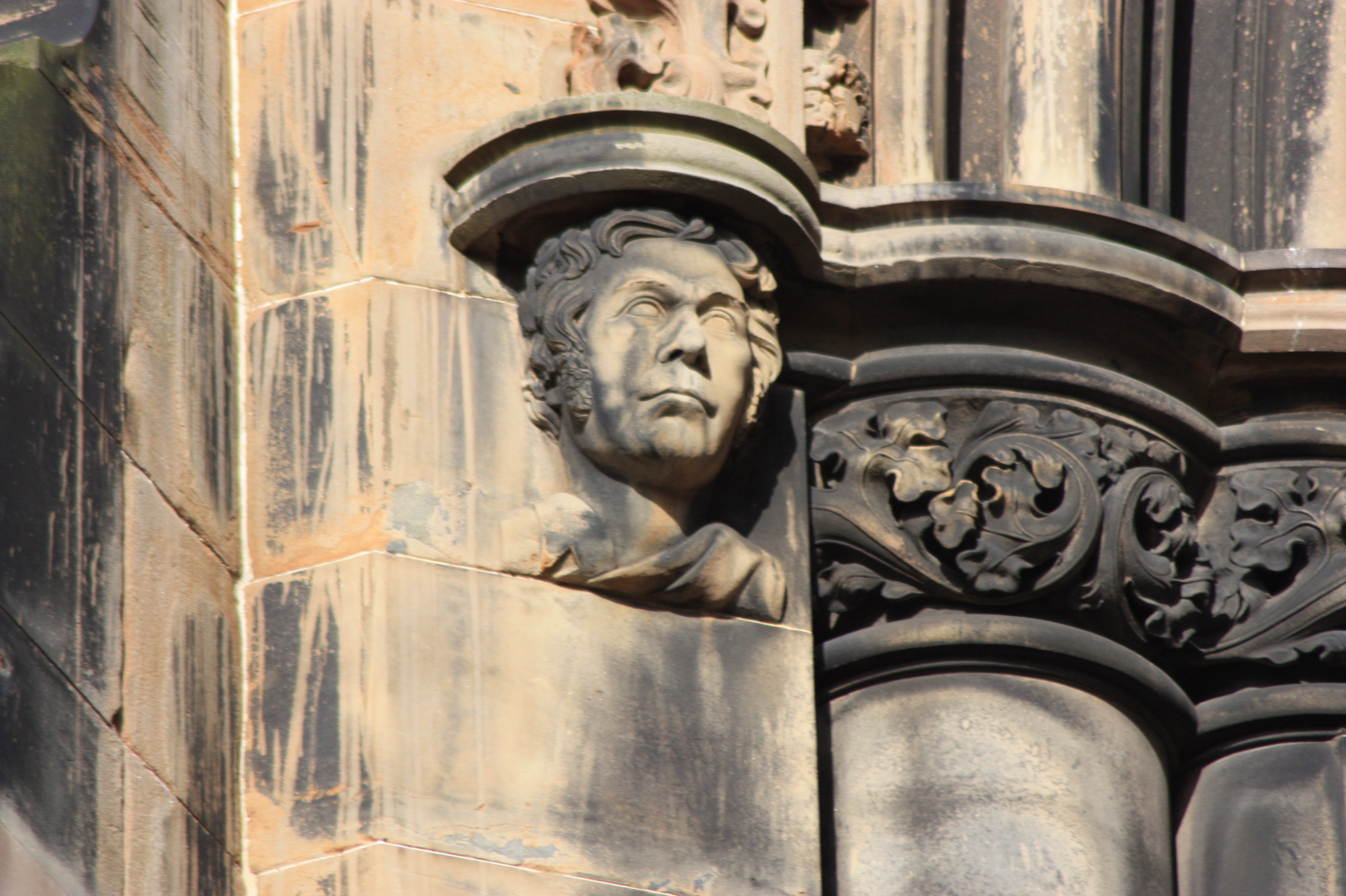
Hogg as depicted on the Scott Monument

== Works ==
=== Poetry ===
- Scottish Pastorals (1801)
- The Mountain Bard (1807)
- The Forest Minstrel (1810)
- The Queen's Wake (1813)
- The Pilgrims of the Sun (1815)
- Mador of the Moor (1816)
- Queen Hynde (1824)
- Winter Evening Tales (1820) - This book also contains short stories and novellas
- A Queer Book (1832)

=== Non-fiction ===
- The Shepherd's Guide (1807) (treatise on sheep)
- The Spy (1810–11) (weekly periodical)
- The Shepherd's Calendar (1829) (collected essays)
- Familiar Anecdotes of Sir Walter Scott (1834) (memoir)
- A Series of Lay Sermons (1834) (moral and religious discourses)

=== Prose fiction ===
- The Brownie of Bodsbeck (1817) (novel)
- The Surpassing Adventures of Allan Gordon (1818) (novella)
- Winter Evening Tales (1820) (short stories, novellas)
- The Three Perils of Man (1822) (novel)
- The Three Perils of Woman (1823) (novel)
- The Private Memoirs and Confessions of a Justified Sinner (1824) (novel)
- The Brownie of the Black Haggs (1828) (short story/tale)
- Altrive Tales (1832) (short stories)
- Tales of the Wars of Montrose (1835) (short stories)
- Tales and Sketches of the Ettrick Shepherd (1837)

=== Songs ===
- Jacobite Relics (1819) (collection of Jacobite protest songs)
- Songs, by The Ettrick Shepherd (1831) (songs)

== See also ==
- Aikwood Tower, the home of Lord Steel, houses an exhibition on the life and work of James Hogg.
- Jean Lorimer (Chloris)
