= Winter Evening Tales =

Collection by James Hogg

Winter Evening Tales is a collection by James Hogg of four novellas, a number of short stories (some of them semi-fictional) and sketches, and three poems, published in two volumes in 1820. Eleven of the items are reprinted, with varying degrees of revision, from Hogg's periodical The Spy (1810‒11).

== Background ==
In 1813 Hogg approached Archibald Constable to propose a collection of Scottish rural prose tales, including a number of those which had appeared in his periodical The Spy two years earlier. Constable turned the offer down, and it was not until 1817 that Hogg revived the project, informing William Blackwood that he had Cottage Winter Nights ready for the press. Discussions made progress, and in May 1818 Blackwood published The Brownie of Bodsbeck; and Other Tales, in two volumes, the other tales being 'The Hunt of Eildon' and 'The Wool-Gatherer', these replacing 'The Bridal of Polmood' which Blackwood rejected. Hogg had hoped that Blackwood would bring out a further two volumes, but in the event the sales of The Brownie were disappointing. However, Blackwood suggested that Hogg should approach Oliver and Boyd, and by August 1819 he had signed an agreement with them for 1500 copies of the desired two additional volumes.

== Editions ==
The first edition of Winter Evening Tales, Collected among the Cottagers in the South of Scotland appeared in two volumes on 19 April 1820. The publishers were Oliver & Boyd in Edinburgh and their associates G. & W. B. Whittaker in London. Sales were good, and in March 1821 Hogg signed an agreement for 1000 copies of a second edition. The text was revised, involving authorial involvement in the first volume, in the general direction of smoothness and propriety.

A critical edition, edited by Ian Duncan, appeared in 2002 as Volume 11 in the Stirling/South Carolina Research Edition of The Collected Works of James Hogg.

== Contents ==
Volume One

The Renowned Adventures of Basil Lee (novella)

- Originally published in Nos 3‒4 of The Spy: here radically re-worked and expanded, with a massive central section detailing Lee's amatory adventures in America

Adam Bell (short story)

- Originally published in No. 35 of The Spy: here abridged

Duncan Campbell (short story)

- Originally published in Nos 49 and 51 of The Spy: here minimally revised

An Old Soldier's Tale (short story)

- First publication here

Highland Adventures (short story)

- Originally published in Nos 40 and 44 of The Spy: here minimally revised

Halbert of Lyne (poem)

- Originally published in Illustrations of a Poetical Character (1816) by R. P. Gillies, who may have been co-author: ten lines omitted here

The Long Pack (short story)

- Originally published in chapbook form in 1817: here substantially revised

A Peasant's Funeral (short story)

- Originally published in No. 12 of The Spy: here unrevised

Dreadful Story of Macpherson (short story)

- Originally published in No. 13 of The Spy: here minimally revised

Story of Two Highlanders (short story)

- Originally published in No. 17 of The Spy: here unrevised

Maria's Tale, Written by Herself (short story)

- Originally published in No. 22 of The Spy: here unrevised

Singular Dream From a Correspondent (short story)

- Originally published in No. 48 of The Spy: here minimally revised

Love Adventures of Mr George Cochrane (novella)

- Originally published in No. 16 of The Spy: here augmented sevenfold with more amatory adventures

Country Dreams and Apparitions

No. I. John Gray o' Middleholm (short story)

- First publication here

Volume Two

The Bridal of Polmood (novella)

- First publication here
- Ch. 1: Giving an antiquary a lift from Moffat to Edinburgh, the author/narrator hears a story relating to Polmood which they pass on the way.
- Ch. 2: Late in the reign of James IV (King of Scots 1488‒1513) the laird of Polmood becomes engaged to Elizabeth Manners, who is more interested in her marital status than in her husband-to-be.
- Ch. 3: The baron Carmichael, one of Elizabeth's admirers, is upset by her engagement and unfavourably disposed towards Polmood.
- Ch. 4: Polmood betters Carmichael in courtly sports, impressing Elizabeth and further antagonising his rival.
- Ch. 5: Carmichael is interrupted while persuading Elizabeth to elope with him.
- Ch. 6: Elizabeth informs the king and Polmond that she 'rues' her engagement. While trying to get her to reverse this ruing Polmood accidentally places himself in a compromising position with Lady Hume.
- Ch. 7: A further confusion results in Carmichael being wrongly accused of sleeping with Lady Ann Gray (the king being the guilty party).
- Ch. 9 [sic]: The king acquits Polmood and remands Carmichael in custody.
- Ch. 10: The king orders preparations to be made for the wedding of Polmood and Elizabeth.
- Ch. 11: Polmood and Elizabeth are married.
- Ch. 12: A shepherd speaks critically of the king to James, who is incognito. He is threatened with execution but pardoned and knighted as Sir William Moray.
- Ch. 13: Sir William sings 'The Herone', alluding to the king's affair with Ann Gray.
- Ch. 14: The king proposes that he and William should undertake surveys of his realm incognito. [The author promises to relate their adventures later in the work, but fails to do so.] During his honeymoon Polmood is upstaged by Alexander, duke of Rosay [Rothsay].
- Ch. 15: Back at Polmood castle, the bored Elizabeth is fascinated by a young gardener, Connel. When Rosay arrives in anticipation of the king's descent, Polmood asks Connel to keep an eye on Rosay and Elizabeth.
- Ch. 16: Connel reveals himself to Elizabeth as Carmichael. He withdraws to a hiding-place when Rosay discovers his secret and informs Polmood.
- Ch. 17: Polmood has reason to believe Rosay has seduced Elizbeth. After a hunting party two decapitated corpses are found, believed to be Polmood and another knight, and it is thought Carmichael is responsible for their deaths.
- Ch. 18: A rustic pair hear what they take to be Polmood's ghost speaking of 'wicked Elizabeth'. The seeming ghost also appears to Elizabeth on her own and with Rosay.
- Ch. 19: Polmood, disguised as a palmer, finds Rosay and Elizabeth in a woodland bower. He binds them and hangs them on a tree, killing Rosay. Carmichael, in shepherd guise, arrives and wounds Polmood fatally. Before his death Polmood indicates that he killed the two knights, taking them for Rosay and his companion Lord Hamilton, and that he acted the part of his own ghost. A year later, Carmichael and Elizabeth are married.

King Gregory (ballad)

- Originally published in The Edinburgh Annual Register for 1812 (1814): limited revision here

The Shepherd's Calendar (five sketches)

- Originally published in Blackwood's Edinburgh Magazine in 1817 (Chs 3‒5) and 1819 (Chs 1 and 2): largely unrevised here

Country Dreams and Apparitions

No. II. Connel of Dee (poem)

- Originally published as part of Midsummer Night Dreams in Vol. 2 of The Poetical Works of James Hogg (1822): two lines censored in 1822 are here restored (451‒52)

No. III. The Wife of Lochmaben (short story)

- Originally published in No. 18 of The Spy: greatly expanded here

No. IV. Cousin Mattie (short story)

- First publication here

No. V. Welldean Hall (novella)

- First publication here

No. VI. Tibby Johnston's Wraith (short story)

- First publication here

== Reception ==
The reviewers generally accorded Winter Evening Tales a favourable reception. The depiction of rural life was admired as truthful and vivacious, but there were many objections to what was seen as Hogg's coarseness. Of the two longest novellas, 'The Bridal of Polmood' and 'Basil Lee', the former was preferred as more artistically finished in contrast to the latter's lack of refinement.
