= The Brownie of Bodsbeck =

The Brownie of Bodsbeck (1818) is the first (short) novel by James Hogg. Set in the Scottish Borders in 1685 it presents a sympathetic picture of the persecuted Covenanters and a harsh view of the Royalists led by Clavers (Claverhouse). It draws extensively on local superstitions.

== Background ==
It is not known for certain when Hogg composed The Brownie of Bodsbeck. It may have been in existence, or at least in contemplation, as early as 1813. The work was probably one of The Rural and Traditional Tales of Scotland that Hogg informed William Blackwood at the beginning of 1817 were ready to be printed. The Brownie was making its way through the press in January 1818, and it is clear from Hogg's letters to Blackwood that the material he is providing in batches consists of a transcription of an earlier manuscript: the amount of revision is unspecified. The date of composition of The Brownie is particularly important because Hogg claimed that, contrary to popular assumption, his novel was composed before the very different treatment of the period by Walter Scott in Old Mortality, which appeared in December 1816 with a much less sympathetic view of the Covenanters and a distinctly less harsh depiction of Claverhouse.

== Plot summary ==
Compassion leads Walter Laidlaw, a man of no strong religious views, to assist a group of Covenanters in hiding near his farm of Chapelhope. Unknown to him, his daughter Katharine is also helping them, drawing on local superstition to cast their leader in the role of Brownie. She discovers a fellow Covenanting sympathiser in a recently engaged servant, old Nanny Elshinder. Taken into custody by Clavers, Walter witnesses the commander's harsh behaviour before himself escaping sentence of death by defying witnesses for the prosecution at his trial. On his return to Chapelhope he is introduced by his daughter to the Covenanters, their leader being John Brown of Caldwell who is revealed to be Nanny's long-lost husband.

== Editions ==
The Brownie of Bodsbeck; and Other Tales. By James Hogg, Author of "The Queen's Wake," &c. &c. was published in two volumes in 1818 by William Blackwood, Edinburgh and John Murray, London. The two other tales were short stories, or novellas: 'The Wood-gatherer', revised from its original publication as 'The Country Laird. A Tale by John Miller' in Hogg's periodical The Spy Nos 24‒26 (February 1811); and 'The Hunt of Eildon', published for the first time. In 'The Wool-gatherer' a young modern laird befriends and eventually marries the secret wife of his late brother and mother of that brother's son. 'The Hunt of Eildon', a virtuoso display of medieval enchantment and shape-changing, centres on the beneficent actions of two innocent young women who have been changed into hounds with supernatural powers.

The Brownie of Bodsbeck was included in the first volume of the posthumous Tales and Sketches, by The Ettrick Shepherd, 6 vols (Glasgow, 1837). 'The Wool-gatherer' also appeared in the first volume, and 'The Hunt of Eildon' was included in the third. It is likely that some of the substantive changes for The Brownie in this edition had been made by Hogg.

The Brownie of Bodsbeck was edited by Douglas S. Mack in 1976 (Edinburgh and London), taking the first edition as copy-text but restoring manuscript readings and incorporating a small number of revisions from the 1837 edition so as to respect what are judged to have been Hogg's intentions.

== Chapter summary ==
Ch. 1: Walter Laidlaw of Chapelhope is told by his wife Maron that their daughter Katharine has been ordering her Brownie to kill five of Clavers' Highland troopers.

Ch. 2: (Chs 2‒4 fill in the background to Ch. 1) The narrator indicates that Maron, unlike Walter, is much influenced by a local curate. Clavers loses five of his men sent to hunt down the Covenanters who had taken refuge in the area.

Ch. 3: The reader is told, in Walter's own words, how he took compassion on a group of the Covenanters and provided them regularly with food.

Ch. 4: Continuing Walter's story, the narrator tells how he persuaded the Covenanters to stay in the area when they declined to put him in danger by continuing to accept his bounty.

Ch. 5: Katharine's Brownie scares most of the servants away from Chapelhope. Fearing her own expulsion she consults old Nanny Elshinder, a recently engaged servant, but finds her uncommunicative: Nanny waits till she thinks Katharine is out of hearing before singing an explicitly covenanting song.

Ch. 6: Clavers and his men arrive and examine in turn Nanny, Katharine (defended physically by her father), and finally Maron who reveals the Covenanters' hiding-place.

Ch. 7: Clavers arrests the Laidlaws and subjects a shepherd to harsh questioning about the deaths of the five Highland troopers.

Ch. 8: Clavers stages a mock execution of the two Laidlaw boys to elicit information.

Ch. 9: Walter's family is released but he is forced to accompany Clavers and witnesses a number of severe actions, including the execution of a number of Covenanters.

Ch. 10: The Brownie saves Katharine from an assault by the curate. Preparing to leave Chapelhope to seek help for her father from the laird of Drumelzier she entrusts the house to Nanny, whose covenanting credentials are now made clear, with instructions to admit one or two Covenanters every night.

Ch. 11: Katharine finds Drumelzier helpful, but on her return she discovers that Chapelhope has been deserted as haunted. Walter and his fellow-prisoners are transferred from the custody of a fair-minded Highlander Sergeant Daniel Roy Macpherson to less sympathetic officers to be taken to Edinburgh.

Ch. 12: The vacation of Chapelhope is explained: Nanny had seen the curate confronted by the Brownie and attendant spirits, resulting in his disappearance. Katharine and Nanny engage in Covenanting discourse. At the neighbouring Riskinhope farm, where she has taken refuge, Nanny joins the inhabitants in prayer (led with peculiar eloquence by the shepherd Davie Tait) and sacred song, after the inadvertent raising of a spirit.

Ch. 13: Davie Tait discovers that the Brownie has been carrying out part of the reaping, and a week later it is discovered that the job has been completed, and then that the dirty and laborious job of smearing the sheep has also been accomplished.

Ch. 14: At the end of his trial in Edinburgh, Walter is released on bail, after he defies his accusers in the king's name, following advice given by Sergeant Macpherson who now happily maintains that the Laidlaws and Macphersons are related.

Ch. 15: On Halloween Walter returns home, in spite of supernatural warnings, and looking in through a window sees Katharine and the Brownie with a fresh corpse. He takes refuge at Riskinhope with Davie Tait.

Ch. 16: Katharine leads her father to a concealed cave where the Brownie and his companions are identified as John Brown of Caldwell and other Covenanters.

Ch. 17: In the concluding explanations, John Brown is revealed to be Nanny's long-lost husband.
