= The Three Perils of Man =

1822 novel by James Hogg

The Three Perils of Man; or, War, Women, and Witchcraft. A Border Romance is an 1822 novel by James Hogg set in the Scottish Borders during the reign of Robert II, King of Scots (1371–1390).

== Composition and sources ==
The first surviving reference to the composition of The Three Perils of Man dates from November 1819, when Hogg indicated he had completed a little over one volume. He seems not to have made much progress in the next nine months, and it was not until the spring of 1821 that he claimed the novel was complete, albeit in need of further revision. He worked on proofs at the end of the year.

For the story of a nobleman holding a castle at his lady's behest Hogg was drawing on accounts of the defence of Castle Douglas by Sir John Webiton, or Walton, against Sir James Douglas. The tale was originally told by John Barbour (d. 1395) in The Brus and then by David Hume of Godscroft in The History of the Houses of Douglas and Angus (1644). In Hogg's own time it appears in a note to The Lord of the Isles (1815) by Walter Scott, and in the same author's essay on 'Chivalry' in the 1818 supplement of the Encyclopaedia Britannica. Hogg also draws on The Brus for an episode actually involving Roxburgh castle, in attacking which Sir James Douglas and his men are taken for cattle.

== Editions ==
The only edition of the complete novel in Hogg's lifetime appeared in London in three volumes in June 1822, the publishers being Longman, Hurst, Rees, Orme, and Brown. Lacking confidence in the work as a whole, Hogg extracted certain sections for separate publication: poems from the novel appeared in a number of journals; 'The Laird of Peatstacknowe's Tale' was retitled 'Marion's Jock' for Altrive Tales in 1832; 'The Poet's Tale' became 'The Three Sisters' in Fraser's Magazine for May 1835, but as a poem; and most extensively the Roxburgh material became 'The Siege of Roxburgh' in the posthumous final volume of Tales and Sketches (1837).

The standard modern critical edition of the novel, by Judy King and Graham Tulloch, was published in 2012 by Edinburgh University Press as Volume 27 of the Stirling/South Carolina Research Edition of The Collected Works of James Hogg.

== Plot summary ==
During the reign of Robert II, King of Scots (1371–1390), the English Sir Philip Musgrave captures Roxburgh castle and is committed to hold it for a specified period to satisfy his mistress Lady Jane Howard. James, Earl of Douglas, takes up a challenge by Robert's daughter Princess Margaret to recapture it within the same period. Sir Walter Scott of Rankleburn assists Douglas indirectly by harassing the English supply chain, to his own advantage. Both Jane and Margaret assume male disguise in order to keep an eye on their respective lovers. After Margaret has recognised Jane and arranged for her to be delivered up to Douglas, she (disguised as her own page) is captured by the English garrison at Roxburgh and executed. A monk conveys instructions to Douglas from her spirit to take revenge. The central part of the novel focusses on a delegation dispatched by Sir Walter Scott to ascertain the future fortunes of his family from the wizard Michael Scott at his castle of Aikwood. It consists of the bard Colley Carol, Thomas Craik (the Deil's Tam), Gibby Jordan of Peatstacknowe, and a friar, with Charlie Scott as leader and a girl and a boy (Delany Hall and Elias) as presents. They encounter a hostile reception. After a series of supernatural events, egress from the castle having become impossible, the wizard arranges a story-telling competition. More supernatural events follow. Back at Roxburgh, faced with the execution of his captured brother and defilement of Jane, Sir Philip takes his own life. In exchange for two baronies Sir Walter Scott takes direct action, capturing the castle by disguising his men as cattle. Margaret tests Douglas's commitment to herself by a further adoption of a disguise, and the couple marry. After a competition among the knights for ladies' favours, the friar unites Jane in marriage with Charlie, and Delany with Colley. The novel ends with an account by Gibby of Michael Scott's death in combat with a diabolical rival.

== Principal characters ==
Central characters in bold

- Robert II, King of Scots
- His queen
- **Princess Margaret**, his daughter
- **Sir Philip Musgrave**
- Sir Richard Musgrave, his brother
- **Lady Jane Howard**, his mistress
- **James, Earl of Douglas and Mar**
- **Sir Walter Scott of Rankleburn and Murdieston** (Sir Ringan Redhough in pre-2012 editions)
- Lady Rankleburn, his wife
- Dickie o' Dryhope, his cousin
- Simon of Gemelscleuch
- **Charlie Scott of Yardbire**
- **Patrick Chisholm of Castleweary**
- **Dan Chisholm**, his son
- **Bess Chisholm**, his daughter
- Sir Stephen Vernon
- Sandy Yellowlees, a fisherman
- Henry Clavering, an English officer
- Mary Kirkmichael of Balmedie, a Scottish maid of honour
- Benjamin, a monk
- **Colley Carol**, a poet
- **Gibby Jordan, Laird of Peatstacknowe**
- Thomas Craik (The Deil's Tam)
- **Roger, a Friar**
- **Michael Scott of Aikwood**, a wizard
- Prim, Prig, and Pricker, his three diabolical imps
- Delany Hall
- Elias
- Jock Robson of the Trows, a shepherd
- **Will Laidlaw of Craik**
- Lady Neville of Ravensworth

== Chapter summary ==
=== Volume One ===
Ch.1: The English Sir Philip Musgrave has taken Roxburgh castle and is committed to hold it until the end of the Christmas holidays to satisfy his mistress Lady Jane Howard. James, Earl of Douglas, takes up a challenge by Princess Margaret to retake the castle by the same date. Sir Walter Scott of Rankleburn refuses to join Douglas directly: he is assured by an old man of the future success of the Scott family.

Ch. 2: Sir Walter discusses the situation with his kinsmen, including his officious cousin Dickie o' Dryhope, and it is resolved they should enrich themselves by intercepting the English supply chain.

Ch. 3: The opposing forces at Roxburgh engage in single combat and skirmishes, in one of which Sir Philip's brother Richard is taken prisoner.

Ch. 4: Jane Howard and Princess Margaret, both in male disguise, encounter each other uneasily at Patrick Chisholm's home of Castleweary.

Ch. 5: Princess Margaret, who has penetrated Jane Howard's disguise, tells Patrick's son Dan to take Jane and her party prisoner and convey them to Douglas. Going ahead to Hawick, Margaret disguises herself afresh as her own page Colin and attaches herself to Douglas. Back at Castleweary, Charlie Scott of Yardbire arrives and joins Dan in conveying the disguised Jane and her party to Douglas, refusing a bribe to set them free.

Ch. 6: In front of Roxburgh castle Douglas confirms Jane's identity and executes her followers.

Ch. 7: Sandy Yellowlees, a fisherman, discovers a secret supply route to Roxburgh castle: he is captured and executed by the garrison, one of whom (Sir Stephen Vernon) is exposed and executed as a traitor. During a visit under safe conduct to the Scots camp, Sir Philip meets his condemned brother and Lady Jane, increasing the pressure on him to surrender the castle.

Ch. 8: Margaret (as Colin, speaking for his mistress) demands that Douglas take the castle immediately and that he have Jane mutilated. During an English sally Colin (Margaret) is captured.

Ch. 9: Sir Richard Musgrave is executed by the Scots (but see Vol. 3, Ch. 6), and Colin (Margaret) by the English (but see Vol. 3, Ch. 10). Douglas learns of Colin's identity. A monk called Benjamin conveys instructions to Douglas from Margaret's spirit to take measured steps of revenge.

Ch. 10: A delegation sent by Sir Walter to ascertain from the wizard Michael Scott the future fortunes of his family is accommodated at Jock Robson's house. The party consists of the bard Colley Carol, Thomas Craik (the Deil's Tam), Gibby Jordan of Peatstacknowe, and a friar, with Charlie Scott as leader.

Ch. 11: The delegation survive an attack by a party of Halls trying to rescue Delany Hall, who, together with a boy called Elias, is intended as a present to Michael Scott.

Ch. 12: The delegation arrive at Aikwood tower after an adventure involving the corpse of one of the Hall party on horseback, and a general expression of suspicion of the friar's motives in offering Delany spiritual instruction using oriental language.

=== Volume Two ===
Ch. 1: The delegation receive a hostile reception from Michael and his entourage, but they eventually win control of the castle and lock up the seneschal Gourlay.

Ch. 2: Using sacred objects, the delegation overcome first an aggressive witch, and then Michael's three diabolical imps. They release Gourlay when Michael promises to keep him under control.

Ch. 3: Michael and the friar compete in a demonstration of their respective powers.

Ch. 4: The friar frees Michel from the power of a demon by prayer, and they exchange accounts of their beliefs. Egress from the castle being impossible, the friar having blasted the keys away along with Gourlay, Michael proposes a story-telling competition with Delany as the prize.

Ch. 5: In 'The Friar's Tale' the friar tells a story of lost love in biblical style.

Ch. 6: Delany turns out to be the daughter of the friar's lost love. In the 'Laird of Peatstacknowe's Tale' Gibby tells the story of a voracious cowherd Jock.

Ch. 7: In 'Charlie Scott's Tale' Charlie tells of his early fighting career: in one episode the spirit of the Lady of Ravensworth adjures Charlie and Will Laidlaw of Craik to take care of her son whom they have rescued.

Ch. 8: Colley Carol reveals himself to be the boy of 'Charlie Scott's Tale', and Thomas Craik identifies himself as the Jock of Gibby's narrative. In 'Tam Craik's Tale' Thomas tells the rest of his life story, involving his mistreatment by a deceitful master and his apprenticeship to a mischievous proficient in swordsmanship.

=== Volume Three ===
Ch. 1: A party led by Dan Chisholm, sent by Sir Walter Scott, arrives at Aikwood with food but they are repelled by a master fiend.

Ch. 2: In 'The Poet's Tale' Colley tells of three maidens who, with divine assistance, effect the abolition of the worship of Odin.

Ch. 3: Gibby is chosen by lot to be killed and eaten if it should prove necessary.

Ch. 4: Approaching Melrose, Dan and his party are met by strange horsemen purporting to be the abbot and three monks, with whom they return to Aikwood where Michael prophesies future glory for the Scott family.

Ch. 5: Michael and the abbot (revealed as the Devil) torment Dan and his party, turning them into bulls but providing the friar with the means to reinstate them.

Ch. 6: Back at Roxburgh, Sir Philip Musgrave responds to the threatened execution of his brother Richard (who was in fact not killed in Vol. 1, Ch. 9) and defilement of Lady Jane by taking his own life. Douglas visits Sir Walter, who agrees to prosecute the taking of Roxburgh in exchange for two baronies.

Ch. 7: A band including Will Laidlaw and Dan Chisholm, disguised as English peasants, bringing hides to Sir Walter, arrive at Peter Chisholm's farm (Dan leaves the group before their arrival). Will recognises his sweetheart Bess Chisholm dressed as her absent brother and reveals his identity to her. A group of actual English thieves arrive, and Laidlaw's band overcome them. Laidlaw attacks more of the thieves who are stealing the Chisholm livestock, the disguised Bess being wounded in the skirmish and granted by her grateful father to Will. Laidlaw's men are reunited with Dan, and they all make their way to Roxburgh with the accumulated hides.

Ch. 8: Sir Walter takes Roxburgh castle by disguising his men as cattle.

Ch. 9: To save her from the English hide-merchant, whose identity he never discovers, Peter Chisholm gets Laidlaw to marry Bess immediately. The friar asks Charlie Scott to agree that Delany should marry Colley Carol. An English attempt to rescue Jane Howard from the Douglas's power at Roxburgh is frustrated. The King and Queen arrive at Roxburgh.

Ch. 10: The monk Benjamin tries to persuade the King that Douglas should marry Jane Howard, but Douglas refuses, and it turns out that Benjamin is Lady Margaret in disguise: she had not in fact been executed, and was testing Douglas. The pair marry, and during the wedding celebrations the friar's mule proves disruptive.

Ch. 11: Jane Howard tells Mary Kirkmichael that she is jealous of Lady Margaret. After Mary has prepared the ground, the knights are invited to compete for ladies' favours: the friar unites Colley Carol with Delany and Charlie Scott with Jane. At the Queen's request, Charlie accompanies her in search of the Devil, but instead they meet Gibby Jordan.

Ch. 12: Gibby tells of his tormenting by Michael and the devil at Aikwood, and of Michael's death in combat with his diabolical rival.
