= The Queen's Wake =

1813 poem by James Hogg

The Queen's Wake is a narrative poem by James Hogg, first published in 1813. It consists of an Introduction, three Nights, and a Conclusion, totalling over five thousand lines, and there are also authorial notes. The poem presents the contributions, in various metres, of a series of Scottish bards to a competition organised by Mary, Queen of Scots on her arrival in Scotland from France in 1561.

== Background ==
In his 'Memoir of the Author's Life', revised in 1832, Hogg maintained that he was encouraged by his friend John Grieve to build on his earlier poetic achievements as he sought to begin a literary career in Edinburgh. He recalled that, recognising that what he had produced recently, including pieces for his periodical The Spy, consisted of ballads or metrical tales, he decided that if he was to produce a long poem it would best consist of a collection of such shorter pieces: from this came the idea of the framework afforded by a bardic competition staged by Mary, Queen of Scots. 'Macgregor', sung by the eleventh bard, and 'King Edward's Dream', sung by the fifteenth, appeared in The Spy. The bulk of The Queen's Wake was probably composed between March and September 1812.

== Editions ==
=== First and second editions ===
The Queen's Wake: A Legendary Poem, by James Hogg was first published by George Goldie in Edinburgh, and by Longman, Hurst, Rees, Orme, and Brown in London on 30 January 1813. On 14 June the same publishers re-issued the copies remaining unsold as a second edition, with replacement pages at the beginning and end.

=== Third and fourth editions ===
Goldie published a third edition, this time with Henry Colburn in London, on 14 July 1814: for this Hogg made a number of changes, notably providing 'The Witch of Fife' with a happy ending at the suggestion of Walter Scott and modernising the language of 'Kilmeny'. Goldie then became bankrupt, and the edition was re-issued as the fourth on 15 December 1814 published by William Blackwood in Edinburgh and John Murray in London.

=== Fifth and sixth editions ===
In 1819 a fifth edition appeared, carefully revised by Hogg from the third, notably expanding the portraits of the eighth, ninth, and eleventh bards, with illustrations aimed at a subscription readership. It was published by Blackwood and Murray and accompanied by a sixth edition using the same type but smaller sheets.

=== Critical edition ===
A critical edition, by Douglas S. Mack, appeared as Volume 14 in the Stirling/South Carolina Research Edition of The Complete Works of James Hogg published by Edinburgh University Press in 2004. This presents amended texts of the first and fifth editions.

== Summary ==
Introduction

On her arrival in Scotland, Mary, Queen of Scots summons the nation's bards to a competition at Christmas [1813: at Easter].

Night the First

In 'Malcolm of Lorn', the first bard, Rizzio, sings elaborately of a youth who is grief-stricken when his beloved sails for foreign parts with her father and expires just as she returns.

In 'Young Kennedy', the second bard, Gardyn, sings of Kennedy's seduction of Matilda and murder of her father, whose spirit haunts their marriage bed, driving Matilda to madness and death.

In 'The Witch of Fife', the eighth bard, from Leven, sings of an old man who follows his wife and other witches to Carlisle to drink the bishop's wine. [In 1813 he is burnt alive, in 1819 rescued by his wife.]

Night the Second

In 'Glen-Avin', the ninth bard, Farquhar of Spey, sings of a sage who dies defying the Spirit of the Storm in the Cairngorms.

In 'Old David', the tenth bard, from Hogg's Ettrick, sings of the rescue by David and his seven sons of the beloved of one of them from a cave where she is imprisoned by marauders taken to be fairies.

The eleventh bard, from Lomond, sings 'The Spectre's Cradle-Song' and 'Macgregor', the latter telling of the eponymous warrior's abduction by a mysterious fatal woman.

In 'Earl Walter', the twelfth bard, from Clyde, sings of young Walter Hamilton's defeating Lord Darcie in single combat before the king and being rewarded with his daughter's hand.

In 'Kilmeny', the thirteenth bard, Drummond of Ern, sings of a young woman who is taken to 'the land of thochte' and returns for a period to impart 'wordis of wonder, and wordis of truthe'.

Night the Third

In 'Mary Scott', the fourteenth bard, from the Borders, sings of how Lord Pringle of Torwoodlee disguises himself as an abbot to visit his beloved Mary, daughter of his rival Tushilaw. When their liaison is discovered, her mother poisons her, but after his forces have triumphed Lord Pringle restores her to life with a kiss, they marry, and peace prevails.

In 'King Edward's Dream', the fifteenth bard, from Lammermoor, sings of the dying Edward I's vision of a future free Scotland entering into a voluntary union with England.

In 'Drumlanrig', the sixteenth bard, from Nithsdale, sings of the defeat of the Earl of Lennox's invading force by James Douglas of Drumlanrig. Douglas is spurred on by May Morison, who has been abducted by the English and whose brother falls in the conflict: at the end she accepts him as her husband.

In 'The Abbot M'Kinnon', the seventeenth bard, from the Hebrides, sings of the sinking of the Abbot of Iona's ship in retribution for his liaison with Matilda of Skye in male disguise.

Conclusion

After a passionate debate between the factions at Court, Queen Mary's harp is awarded to Gardyn. The Ettrick bard is happy to receive a less elaborate instrument, which will eventually be inherited by Hogg.

== Reception ==
The first edition of The Queen's Wake was enthusiastically received by almost all of the reviewers as a triumph by a self-taught genius. The only dissenting voice was The Eclectic Review, which objected to the modern obsession with supernatural beings. The third edition was boosted by a favourable review by Francis Jeffrey in The Edinburgh Review, recognising poetry of a high order, though elsewhere there were less sympathetic verdicts.
