= Cunningham number =

In mathematics, specifically in number theory, a Cunningham number is a certain kind of integer named after English mathematician A. J. C. Cunningham.

== Definition ==
Cunningham numbers are a simple type of binomial number – they are of the form

$$b^n\pm1$$

where b and n are integers ≥ 2, and b is not a perfect power. They are denoted C^{±}(b, n).

== Terms ==
The Cunningham numbers are:

3, 5, 7, 8, 9, 10, 15, 17, 24, 26, 28, 31, 33, 35, 37, 48, 50, 63, 65, 80, 82, 99, 101, 120, 122, 124, 126, 127, 129, 143, 145, 168, 170, 195, 197, ... (sequence A080262 in the OEIS)

The Cunningham numbers C^{−}(b, n) are:

3, 7, 8, 15, 24, 26, 31, 35, 48, 63, 80, 99, 120, 124, 127, 143, 168, 195, 215, 224, 242, 255, 288, 323, 342, 360, 399, 440, 483, ... (sequence A045542 in the OEIS)

The Cunningham numbers C^{+}(b, n) are:

5, 9, 10, 17, 26, 28, 33, 37, 50, 65, 82, 101, 122, 126, 129, 145, 170, 197, 217, 226, 244, 257, 290, 325, 344, 362, 401, 442, 485, ... (sequence A216765 in the OEIS)

It is conjectured that 26 is the only number that is both a Cunningham number C^{−}(b, n) and a Cunningham number C^{+}(b, n), this conjecture is equivalent to that 25 and 27 are the only two perfect powers differ by 2 (see Pillai's conjecture). Note that the proven Catalan's conjecture is that 8 and 9 are the only two perfect powers differ by 1.

== Properties ==
- There are infinitely many even and odd Cunningham numbers. Provable through observation that the infinite series $6^n\pm1$ and $5^n\pm1$ are both contained within the Cunningham numbers, and contain only odd and even numbers respectively.
  - By the same logic, there are infinitely many Cunningham numbers which are 5 modulo 10, 7 modulo 10, 4 modulo 10, or 6 modulo 10. In fact, for every modulo number $n<36$, there are infinitely many Cunningham numbers congruent to every residue mod $n$, however, for $n=36$, there is no Cunningham number congruent to 11, 13, 23, or 25 mod 36, this is because for the numbers m = 11, 13, 23, or 25 mod 36, neither m+1 nor m−1 can be powerful.
- Although by the proven Catalan's conjecture, 8 and 9 are the only two Cunningham numbers that are perfect powers, there are infinitely many Cunningham numbers that are powerful numbers, since if m is a Cunningham number C^{−}(b, n) that is a powerful number (such as 8), then so is $4m(m+1)$. The first ten such Cunningham numbers are:
  - 8 = C^{−}(3,2)
  - 9 = C^{+}(2,3)
  - 288 = C^{−}(17,2)
  - 675 = C^{−}(26,2)
  - 9800 = C^{−}(99,2)
  - 12168 = C^{+}(23,3)
  - 235224 = C^{−}(485,2)
  - 332928 = C^{−}(577,2)
  - 465125 = C^{+}(682,2)
  - 1825200 = C^{−}(1351,2)

== Primality ==
Establishing whether or not a given Cunningham number is prime has been the main focus of research around this type of number. Two particularly famous families of Cunningham numbers in this respect are the Fermat numbers, which are those of the form C^{+}(2, 2^{m}), and the Mersenne numbers, which are those of the form C^{−}(2, p) with prime p.

The prime Cunningham numbers are:

3, 5, 7, 17, 31, 37, 101, 127, 197, 257, 401, 577, 677, 1297, 1601, 2917, 3137, 4357, 5477, 7057, 8101, 8191, 8837, ... (sequence A296422 in the OEIS)

In fact, these numbers are exactly the generalized Fermat primes (which are those of the form C^{+}(b, 2^{m}) with even b) and the Mersenne primes (which are those of the form C^{−}(2, p) with prime p), since if the Cunningham number C^{−}(b, n) is prime, then b = 2 and n is prime, and if the Cunningham number C^{+}(b, n) is prime, then b is even and n is power of 2, this is because the algebraic factorization of the binomial numbers, such as difference of two squares and sum of two cubes.

Cunningham worked on gathering together all known data on which of these numbers were prime. In 1925 he published tables which summarised his findings with H. J. Woodall, and much computation has been done in the intervening time to fill these tables.

== See also ==
- Cunningham Project
