= The Spy (periodical) =

Periodical directed at the Edinburgh market

The Spy was a periodical directed at the Edinburgh market, edited by James Hogg, with himself as principal contributor, which appeared from 1 September 1810 to 24 August 1811. It combined features of two types of periodical established in the 18th century, the essay periodical and the miscellany. As an outsider, Hogg used his periodical to give a critical view of the dominant upper-class culture of Edinburgh, with Walter Scott and Francis Jeffrey as its leading lights, and to launch his career as a writer of fiction as well as poetry.

== Background ==
Hogg established The Spy during the year when he exchanged farming life in the south of Scotland for a literary career in Edinburgh. It combined features of essay periodicals such as The Spectator and The Rambler and miscellanies such as The Scots Magazine. Each issue had normally eight pages, usually containing an essay and one or more original poems. Hogg wrote over half the material himself, with James Gray, Classics master at the Royal High School, Edinburgh and his wife Mary Gray as his principal contributors. In six numbers (19, 35, 36, 39, 48, and 52) Hogg makes use, without acknowledgment, of passages by Samuel Johnson from The Rambler and The Idler.

== Editions ==
The first 13 numbers were printed, rather crudely, by James Robertson, who usually produced popular booklets and chapbooks. The remainder were more expertly printed by Andrew and James Aikman. It is not known how many copies were produced: Hogg indicated there were more than 100 subscribers by the second number; 73 of them withdrew after the fourth number in which the narrator is seduced by his housekeeper, but enough support survived to make it possible to complete 52 issues. As soon as The Spy had finished the year-long run it was made available in volume form, published in Edinburgh by Archibald Constable & Co. with the title The Spy. A Periodical Paper of Literary Amusement and Instruction. Published Weekly, in 1810 and 1811.

Several of Hogg's own contributions to The Spy were included, with smaller or greater revisions, in some of his later publications: most notably, for prose items, Winter Evening Tales (1820) and, for poems, Poetical Works (1822). Two of the longer poems, 'King Edward's Dream' (No. 20) and 'Macgregor, a Highland Tale' (No. 40) were republished as part of The Queen's Wake (1813).

A critical edition of The Spy, by Gillian Hughes, appeared as Volume 8 in the Stirling/South Carolina Research Edition of The Collected Works of James Hogg, published by Edinburgh University Press in 2000.

== Contents ==
All items are by Hogg unless otherwise indicated

No. 1: The editor ('the Spy') introduces himself and his plan to compare Scottish poets and reviewers with each other, noting especially inconsistencies of judgment by individuals.

No. 2: Mr Giles Shuffleton conjures up the characteristic muses of Walter Scott, Thomas Campbell, James Hogg, and John Leyden (continued in Nos 5 and 10). The number ends with two verse epitaphs on Alexander Gibson Hunter of Blackness and Mrs Quin, a prostitute.

Nos 3 and 4: A (fictitious) correspondent tells of his unstable life, as a moral lesson to readers. No. 3 ends with an 'Elegy on Lady Roslin'.

No. 5: Mr Shuffleton's display continues from No. 2 with the muses of James Grahame, Hector Macneill, James Nicol, William Gillespie of Kells (1776‒1825), and James Montgomery. The number ends with an imitation of Catullus by James Park (c. 1778‒1817) and an epitaph by Hogg on Dr John Borthwick Gilchrist and his wife.

No. 6 (by James Gray): A correspondent tells of his stubborn childhood (continued in Nos 8, 9, and 11). The number ends with Gray's 'Elegy on Mrs H[ay] of D[rumelzie]r'.

No. 7: The number contains three letters to the editor: 'Alice Brand' objects to her husband's arranging dinner parties for entertaining and enlightening conversation, which is never forthcoming; 'Fanny Lively' argues against the separation of the sexes on social occasions; and in the third letter (by John Ballantyne) the correspondent censures coarse and immoral features in the earlier issues. The number ends with a poem, 'The Fall of the Leaf'.

Nos 8‒9 (by James Gray): The correspondent of No. 6 continues his life story with an account of his throwing away his prospects as a promising student at Edinburgh. No. 9 ends with 'The Battle of Assaye' by John Leyden, introduced by Walter Scott.

No. 10: Mr Shuffleton's display continues from No. 5 with the muses of Thomas Mounsey Cunningham and Allan Cunningham, James Kennedy, Joanna Baillie, Anne Bannerman, Janet Stuart, and Anne Grant. There is strong popular support for Thomas Campbell, but Walter Scott's supporters prevail, dethroning Reason and appointing Scott judge in his place. The number ends with two poems: 'A Fragment' ('Lord Huntly's sheets …'), and 'Epitaph on a Living Character' ('Warrior, when the battle's o'er …').

No. 11 (James Gray): The stubborn correspondent of Nos 6, 8, and 9 concludes his life story with his descent into bigamy and utter perdition.

No. 12: The editor explains the obstacles that 'John Miller', fresh from the country, will encounter in pursuing a literary career in Edinburgh. He includes as specimens of Miller's writing 'Description of a Peasant's Funeral' and a song, 'Poor Little Jessy'. The number ends with 'A Fragment' ('And ay she sat …').

No. 13: The editor gives a review of the opening night of The Clandestine Marriage by David Garrick and George Colman the Elder at the Theatre Royal, Edinburgh, including remarks by John Miller. The number ends with a letter giving an account of the strange death in 1800 of John Macpherson of Lorick, and a poem 'The Druid' by Janet Stuart.

No. 14 (by William Gillespie): 'Philanthropus' writes in a letter of his experience of the superficial wit prevalent among Edinburgh students. The number ends with two poems by Hogg: 'The Dawn of July, 1810', and 'Scotch Song' ('What gars the parting day-gleam blush?').

No. 15 (by James Gray): A foreign gentleman writes to complain of his difficulty in making the acquaintance of Edinburgh citizens, who are devoted to ostentatious and extravagant parties. The number ends with Hogg's 'Scotch Song' ('Could this ill warl' … ').

No. 16: The editor, a reluctant bachelor, tells of his early love adventures. The number ends with a poem by James Aikman, 'To the Evening Star, Written at Sea by an Emigrant'.

No. 17 (by John Black): 'Metropolitanus' writes from London of the difficulty of producing creative writing in the face of publishers' exploitation. The rest of the number contains Hogg's 'Story of Two Highlanders' and James Gray's poem 'Maria, A Highland Legend'.

No. 18: The editor, unrecognised in a reading room, tells of hearing two different views as to what The Spy should contain and quotes a published argument that it is impossible to please everybody. The number ends with 'Story of the Ghost of Lochmaben' by 'John Miller' and a poem by Miss Lockhart Gillespie, 'The Night Gale'.

No. 19: The new year prompts the editor to express a set of moral and religious sentiments. The number ends with a poem, 'The Close of the Year'.

No. 20 (author unknown, ascribed to Walter Scott or Hogg): 'Well-wisher and Constant Reader' writes on the arguments for and against card-playing, himself preferring the singing of old songs and ballads. The second half of the number consists of Hogg's poem 'King Edward's Dream'.

No. 21 (by James Gray): The writer advocates firm but sympathetic and fair treatment of servants. The number ends with two poems: 'To Mary' by Robert Southey, and 'Song of Wallace' by John Leyden.

No. 22 (probably by Hogg with John Black): 'M. M.' writes with the story of her seduction, to act as a warning. The number ends with 'Will and Davy, A Scotch Pastoral'.

No. 23: In the first half of the number, by James Lister (1750‒1832), 'An Observer' writes to complain about the unfair treatment of prisoners in the Canongate Tolbooth. The second half, by Robert Sym, consists of a letter on card-playing in response to No. 20, and a poem, 'The Twa Craws'.

Nos 24‒26: In 'The Country Laird. A Tale by John Miller' a young laird befriends and eventually marries the secret wife of his late brother and mother of that brother's son. No. 24 ends with a poem 'The Battle of Busaco', and No. 26 with the poem 'The Sailor Boy', probably by William Dimond.

No. 27: In the first half of the number, by Robert Sym, 'T. M.' counters the strictures of 'An Observer' in No. 23. The second half consists of a poem by James Gray, 'Glencoe'.

No. 28 (by Mary Gray): The writer tells of a couple ruined by adversity in the country and then in Edinburgh, and their rescue by a benevolent doctor who, it transpires, had known the wife when they were both children. The number ends with a poem by W[illiam] G[illespie], 'Address to the Setting Moon'.

No. 29: The editor argues against 'extreme impatience under misfortunes', with an illustrative anecdote. The number ends with a poem by 'John Miller', 'The Auld Man's Farewell to his Little House'.

No. 30 (by William Gillespie): In a letter to the editor the writer observes the importance of choosing a wife carefully, bearing in mind the desirability of good nature, good sense, and sensibility. The number ends with a Hogg poem, 'The Lady's Dream'.

No. 31: The editor offers ironical advice on (in)appropriate ways of observing the Sabbath. The number ends with two poems: 'Moor-Burn: A Simile' by Miss Lockhart Gillespie, and Hogg's 'Border Song' ('Lock the door, Lariston …').

No. 32 (by Mary Gray): In a letter to the editor 'C. D.' tells of how he accompanied his daughter to Edinburgh and was unimpressed by the fashionable influences to which she was exposed there. Two songs by Mary Gray conclude the number: 'Song' ('Do not ask me why I languish') and 'The Reason Why'.

No. 33 (by James Gray): The writer argues that much Classical education is wasted on boys, and that it is valuable only when pursued with application and a sense of its usefulness, in achieving which mothers can play a crucial cole. The number ends with a poem by James Aikman, 'Maelstrom'.

No. 34 (by Mary Gray): 'C. D.' tells of his visits to contrasting Edinburgh ladies, one of them an admirably balanced bluestocking.

No. 35: The editor tells a story which he maintains illustrates the taking advantage of a man's passion for eminence. In a letter to the editor 'A. Solomon' says he has been ruined by the predominant ruling passion of vanity.

No. 36: The editor writes, generally favourably, of curiosity. He prints, from manuscript, a letter of James Thomson. There follows a contribution by Robert Anderson enclosing an alleged translation of a letter from ancient Rome. The number ends with two poems: 'The bittern's quavering trump …' by Hogg, and 'The Harper of Mull' by James Aikman.

No. 37 (by James Gray): The writer describes the consolation afforded by a belief in a 'particular providence', with an illustrative story. The number ends with a 'Scottish Song' by Hogg ('Ah Peggy! Since thou'rt gane away').

No. 38 (by Thomas Gillespie, 1778‒1844): 'A Scots Tutor' tells of his education up to his student days in Edinburgh (continued in Nos 42 and 46). The number ends with Hogg's poem 'Morning'.

No. 39: The editor identifies a number of behavioural traits undesirable in society, principally 'affected singularity'. The number ends with an 'Elegy' ('Fair was thy blossom …').

No. 40: 'Malise' relates his tour of the Trossachs with many allusions to Walter Scott's poem The Lady of the Lake and a versification of a story heard on the trip, 'Macgregor.—A Highland Tale'.

No. 41 (by Mary Gray): In a letter to the editor, 'J. S.' argues from his own experience that absence of female contact during prolonged bachelorhood can lead a man to relinquish the idea of marriage.

No. 42 (by Thomas Gillespie): 'A Scots Tutor' takes up his narrative from No. 38, telling of a happy appointment. The number ends with 'To-Morrow', a poem by a Miss Ainslie.

No. 43: The number begins with a letter from 'Metropolitanus' (by John Black) warning of the difficulties facing newcomers to London. There follow a short letter by Robert Sym 'On Monumental Honours', and another (possibly also by Sym) from 'Christian Capias' enumerating her marriageable accomplishments, by which the editor is unimpressed. The number ends with two poems by Hogg: 'Regret', and 'To Time'.

No. 44: Malise's account of his tour of the Trossachs in No. 40 is concluded. The number ends with a poem, 'The Admonition'.

No. 45 (by Mary Gray): Two country girls respond differently to Edinburgh: Elen is industrious, Jessie feckless with predictable consequences.

No. 46 (by Thomas Gillespie): 'A Scots Tutor' concludes the story in Nos 38 and 42 with an account of his unhappy engagement by Lord Chesterrook [the Earl of Wemyss]. The number ends with two poems: 'To the Patriots of Spain' by John Wightman (1762‒1847), and 'A Winter Scene' by Miss Lockhart Gillespie.

No. 47 (by James Gray): The writer points out that human aspirations are liable to be unfulfilled, and that genius is liable to calumny as in a case known to the writer [that of Robert Burns]. The number ends with a poem by Burns, 'Ah! woe is me my mother dear'.

No. 48 (by Hogg, perhaps with Rev. John Gray): 'J. G.' argues against routine ill-speaking, citing a philosophical friend of his acquaintance as a notorious offender. The number ends with two poems: 'Antient Fragment' by Hogg, and 'To Miss Helen K——' by Rev. John Gray.

No. 49: The editor tells the story of the Highland boy Duncan Campbell and his beloved collie dog Oscar (continued in No. 51). The number ends with 'Hymn to the Evening Star'.

No. 50 (by John Clinton Robertson): The writer laments the decline, with the sophistication and corruption of society, in the force and morality of songs and ballads. At the end of the number, a David Black writes 'On the Advantages of Literary Societies'.

No. 51 (continued from No. 49): The editor tells of his friendship with Duncan Campbell, who turns out to be heir to a Highland estate and marries the editor's sister.

No. 52: The editor takes his leave of his readers, defending The Spy against its critics.
