= Binomial number =

In mathematics, specifically in number theory, a binomial number is an integer which can be obtained by evaluating a homogeneous polynomial containing two terms. It is a generalization of a Cunningham number.

== Definition ==
A binomial number is an integer obtained by evaluating a homogeneous polynomial containing two terms, also called a binomial. The form of this binomial is $x^n \!\pm y^n$, with $x > y$ and $n > 1$. However, since $x^n \!- y^n$ is always divisible by $x - y$, when studying the numbers generated from the version with the negative sign, they are usually divided by $x - y$ first. Binomial numbers formed this way form Lucas sequences. Specifically:

$U_n(a+b,ab) = \frac{a^n - b^n}{a-b},$ and $V_n(a+b,ab) = a^n \!+ b^n$

Binomial numbers are a generalization of Cunningham numbers, and it will be seen that the Cunningham numbers are binomial numbers where $y = 1$. Other subsets of the binomial numbers are the Mersenne numbers and the repunits.

== Factorization ==
The main reason for studying these numbers is to obtain their factorizations. Aside from algebraic factors, which are obtained by factoring the underlying polynomial (binomial) that was used to define the number, such as difference of two squares and sum of two cubes, there are other prime factors (called primitive prime factors, because for a given $x^n \!\pm y^n$ they do not factor $x^m \!\pm y^m$ with $m < n$, except for a small number of exceptions as stated in Zsigmondy's theorem) which occur seemingly at random, and it is these which the number theorist is looking for.

Some binomial numbers' underlying binomials have Aurifeuillian factorizations, which can assist in finding prime factors. Cyclotomic polynomials are also helpful in finding factorizations.

The amount of work required in searching for a factor is considerably reduced by applying Legendre's theorem. This theorem states that all factors of a binomial number are of the form $kn + 1$ if $n$ is even or $2kn + 1$ if it is odd.

== Observation ==
Some people write "binomial number" when they mean binomial coefficient, but this usage is not standard and is deprecated.

== See also ==
- Cunningham project
