= Peter Miller Cunningham =

Peter Miller Cunningham (1789–1864) was a Scottish naval surgeon and pioneer in Australia.

== Life ==
Peter Miller Cunningham was the fifth son of John Cunningham, land steward and farmer (1743–1800), and brother of Thomas Mounsey Cunningham (1776–1834) and of Allan Cunningham (1784–1842). He was born at Dalswinton, near Dumfries, in November 1789, and was named after that Peter Miller who is generally recognised as the first person who used steam in propelling boats.

He received his medical education at the University of Edinburgh, and on 10 December 1810 entered the Royal Navy as an assistant surgeon, and in that capacity saw service on the shores of Spain, where the war was then raging. From August 1812 until promoted to the rank of surgeon (28 January 1814) he was employed on board the Marlborough, on the coast of North America. In 1816 he served in the Confiance, on Lake Erie, where he became the close friend of the traveller, Hugh Clapperton.

After 1817 he made four voyages to New South Wales as surgeon-superintendent of convict ships, in which upwards of six hundred criminals were transported to that colony without the loss of a single life. The results of his observations during this period were embodied in his Two Years in New South Wales, (1827, 2 vols.), which was favourably noticed in the Quarterly Review for January 1828, pp. 1–32. To the profits arising from this book he added his early savings while in the Navy, and expended them in an attempt to open up a large tract of land in Australia, which he then fondly regarded as his adopted country. But the locality was perhaps badly chosen, the seasons were certainly unpropitious, and he soon abandoned the struggle, as far as his own personal superintendence was concerned.

His well-earned reputation at the Admiralty, however, speedily procured him employment, and on 22 October 1830 he was appointed to the Tyne, served on the South American station until January 1834, and had opportunities of observing the effects of tropical climates on European constitutions. He joined the Asia in 1836, and, proceeding to the Mediterranean, was present at the blockade of Alexandria in 1840. He left the sea in May 1841, and was placed on the list of medical officers unfit for further service in 1850.

In addition to the work above mentioned he wrote two others: On the Motions of the Earth, and on the Conception, Growth, and Decay of Man and Causes of his Diseases as referable to Galvanic Action, 1834; and Hints for Australian Emigrants, with descriptions of the Water-raising Wheels in Egypt, 1841. He contributed an account of a visit to the Falkland Islands to the Athenaeum and was a frequent writer elsewhere. He was a man of remarkable powers of observation, greatly attached to his brother Allan, and very popular among his friends.

He died at Greenwich on 6 March 1864, aged 74.
