= Alexander Cunningham =

British Army engineer (1814–1893)

Major-General Sir Alexander Cunningham KCIE CSI
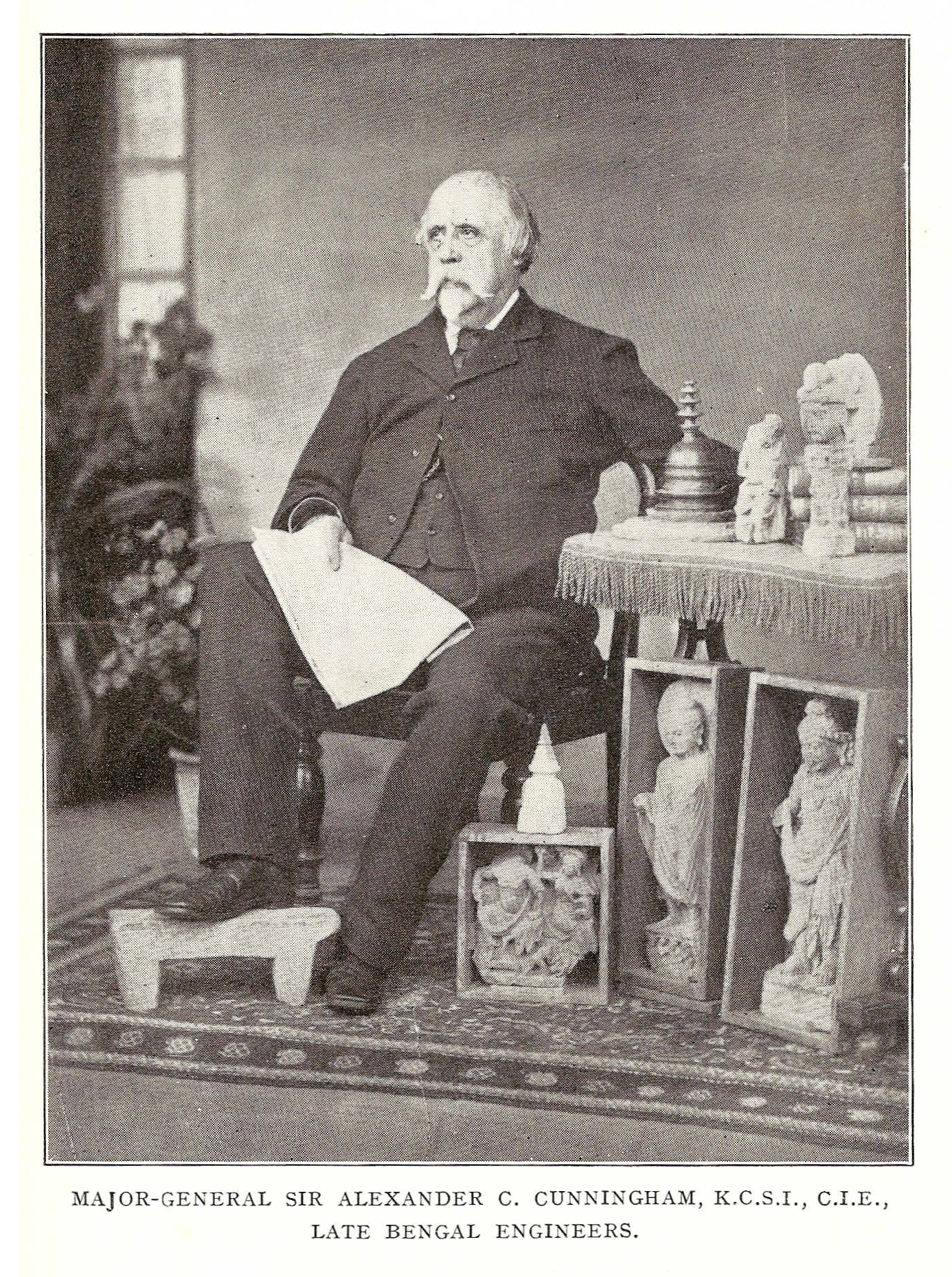
- Born: 23 January 1814; London, United Kingdom
- Died: 28 November 1893 (aged 79) London, United Kingdom
- Spouse: Alicia Maria Whish (m. 1840–1870) (her death)
- Children: Allan J. C. Cunningham; Sir Alexander F. D. Cunningham
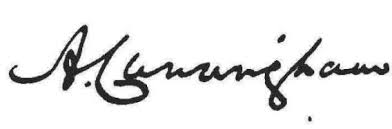
- Signature

Major-General Sir Alexander Cunningham KCIE CSI (23 January 1814 – 28 November 1893) was a British Army engineer with the Bengal Sappers who later took an interest in the history and archaeology of India. In 1861, he was appointed to the newly created position of archaeological surveyor to the government of India; and he founded and organised what later became the Archaeological Survey of India.

He wrote numerous books and monographs and made extensive collections of artefacts. Some of his collections were lost, but most of the gold and silver coins and a fine group of Buddhist sculptures and jewellery were bought by the British Museum in 1894. He was also the father of mathematician Allan Cunningham.

== Early life and career ==
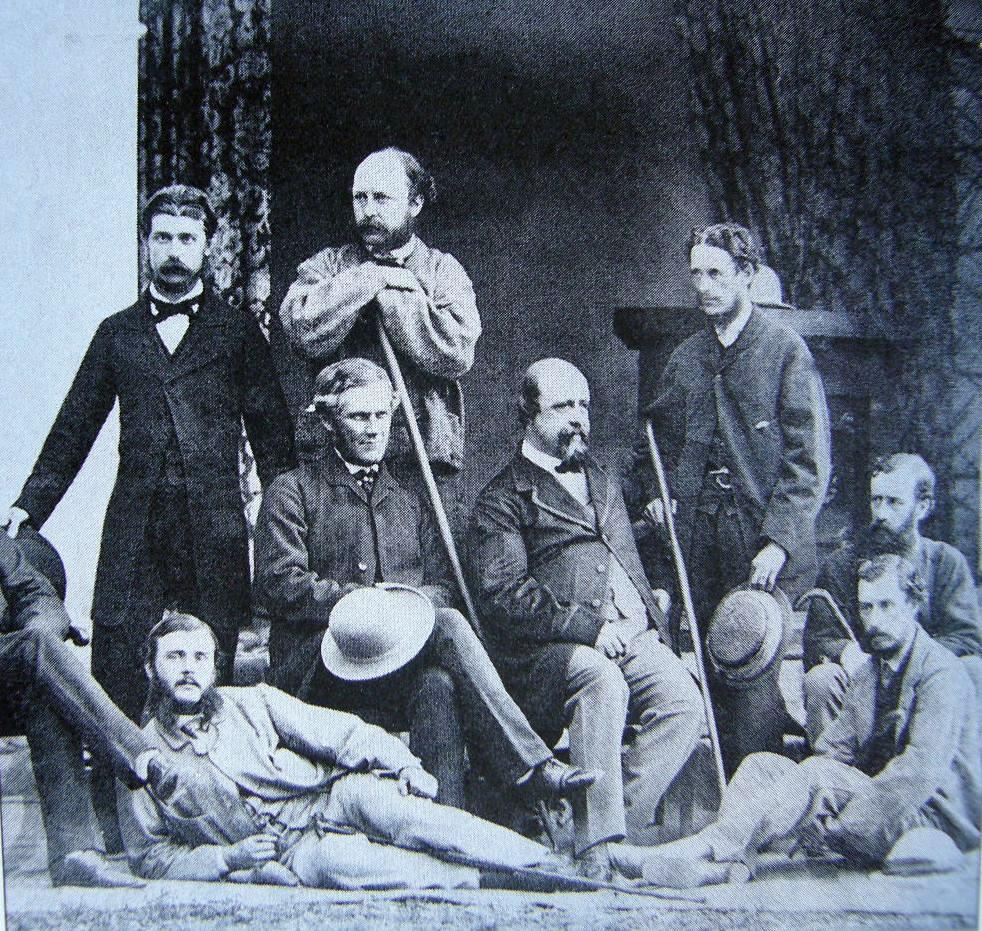
Cunningham (fourth from the right)

Cunningham was born in London on 23 January 1814 to the Scottish poet Allan Cunningham (1784–1842) and his wife Jean née Walker (1791–1864). Along with his older brother, Joseph, he received his early education at Christ's Hospital, London. Through the influence of Sir Walter Scott, both Joseph and Alexander obtained cadetships at the East India Company's Addiscombe Seminary (1829–31), followed by technical training at the Royal Engineers Estate at Chatham.

Alexander joined the Bengal Engineers at the age of 19 as a Second Lieutenant and he spent the next 28 years in the service of British Government of India. He demonstrated his abilities as an official by surveying flood-prone areas in and around Delhi. Cunningham's interest in the history and architecture of ancient India developed during his service. Soon after arriving in India on 9 June 1833, he met James Prinsep. He was in daily communication with Prinsep during 1837 and 1838 and became his intimate friend, confidant and pupil. Prinsep passed on to him his lifelong interest in Indian archaeology and antiquity.

From 1836 to 1840, he was ADC to Lord Auckland, the Governor-General of India. During this period he visited Kashmir, which was then not well explored. He finds mention by initials in Up the Country by Emily Eden.

== Military life ==
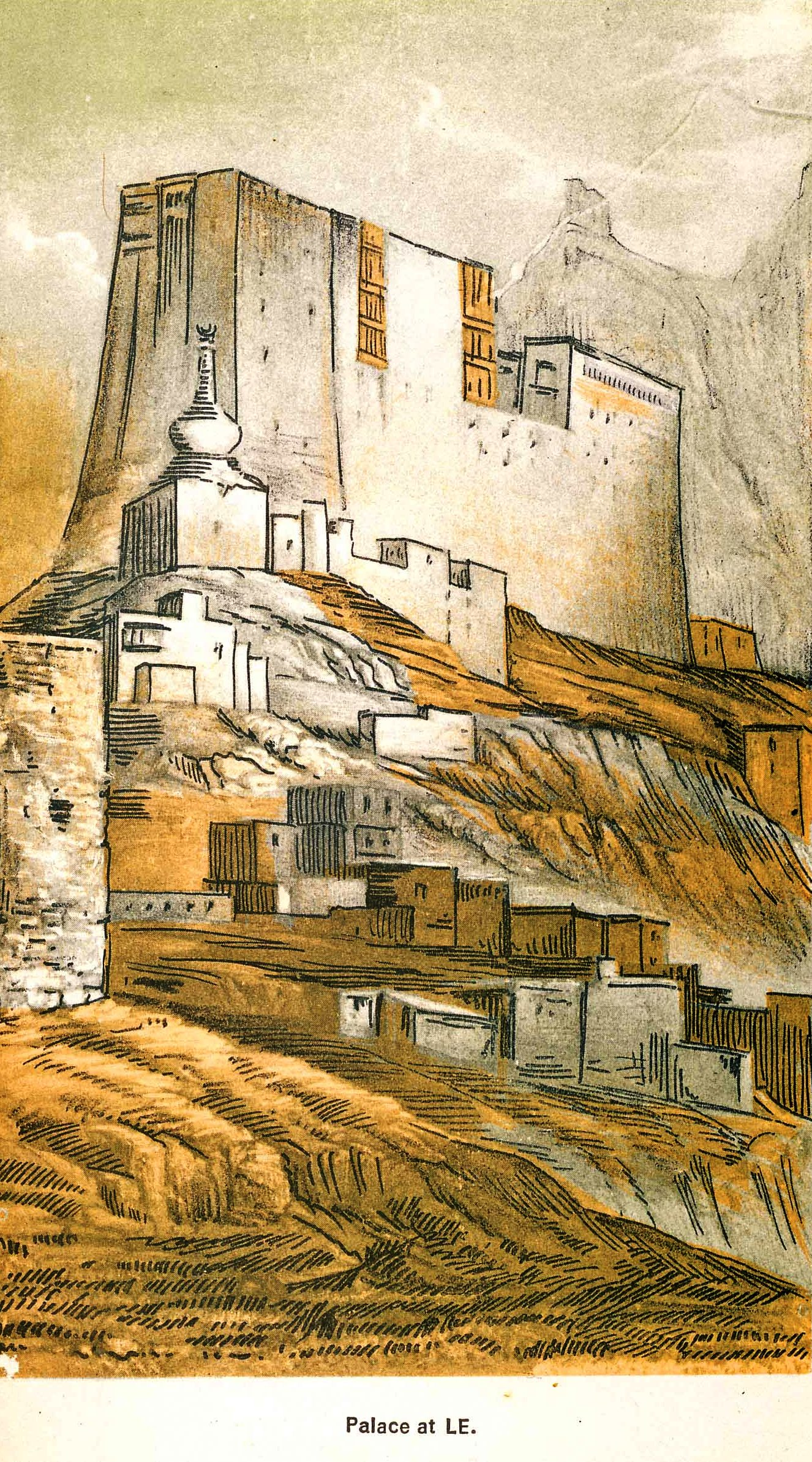
Leh Palace, Ladakh. Illustration from Ladak: Physical, Statistical, and Historical

In 1841 Cunningham was made executive engineer to the king of Oudh. In 1842 he was called to serve the army in thwarting an uprising in Bundelkhand by the ruler of Jaipur. He was then posted at Nowgong in central India before he saw action at the Battle of Punniar in December 1843. He became engineer at Gwalior and was responsible for constructing an arched stone bridge over the Morar River in 1844–45. In 1845–46 he was called to serve in Punjab and helped construct two bridges of boats across the Beas River prior to the Battle of Sobraon.

In 1846, he was made commissioner along with P. A. Vans Agnew to demarcate boundaries. Letters were written to the Chinese and Tibetan officials by Lord Hardinge, but no officials joined. A second commission was set up in 1847 which was led by Cunningham to establish the Ladakh-Tibet boundary, which also included Henry Strachey and Thomas Thomson. Henry and his brother Richard Strachey had trespassed into Lake Mansarovar and Rakas Tal in 1846 and his brother Richard revisited in 1848 with botanist J. E. Winterbottom. The commission was set up to delimit the northern boundaries of the Empire after the First Anglo-Sikh War concluded with the Treaty of Amritsar, which ceded Kashmir as war indemnity expenses to the British. His early work Essay on the Aryan Order of Architecture (1848) arose from his visits to the temples in Kashmir and his travels in Ladakh during his tenure with the commission. He was also present at the battles of Chillianwala and Gujrat in 1848–49. In 1851, he explored the Buddhist monuments of Central India along with Lieutenant Maisey and wrote an account of these.

In 1856 he was appointed chief engineer of Burma, which had just been annexed by Britain, for two years; and from 1858 served for three years in the same post in the North-Western Provinces. In both regions, he established public works departments. He was therefore absent from India during the Rebellion of 1857. He was appointed Colonel of the Royal Engineers in 1860. He retired on 30 June 1861, having attained the rank of Major General.

== Archaeology ==
Cunningham had taken a keen interest in antiquities from early on in his career. Following the activities of Jean-Baptiste Ventura (general of Ranjit Singh)—who, inspired by the French explorers in Egypt, had excavated the bases of pillars to discover large stashes of Bactrian and Roman coins—excavations became a regular activity among British antiquarians.

In 1834 he submitted to the Journal of the Asiatic Society of Bengal, an appendix to James Prinsep's article, on the relics in the Mankiala stupa. He had conducted excavations at Sarnath in 1837 along with Frederick Charles Maisey and made careful drawings of the sculptures. In 1842 he excavated at Sankassa and at Sanchi in 1851. In 1854, he published The Bhilsa Topes, a piece of work which attempted to establish the history of Buddhism based on architectural evidence.

By 1851, he also began to communicate with William Henry Sykes and the East India Company on the value of an archaeological survey. He provided a rationale for providing the necessary funding, arguing that the venture

... would be an undertaking of vast importance to the Indian Government politically, and to the British public religiously. To the first body it would show that India had generally been divided into numerous petty chiefships, which had invariably been the case upon every successful invasion; while, whenever she had been under one ruler, she had always repelled foreign conquest with determined resolution. To the other body it would show that Brahmanism, instead of being an unchanged and unchangeable religion which had subsisted for ages, was of comparatively modern origin, and had been constantly receiving additions and alterations; facts which prove that the establishment of the Christian religion in India must ultimately succeed.

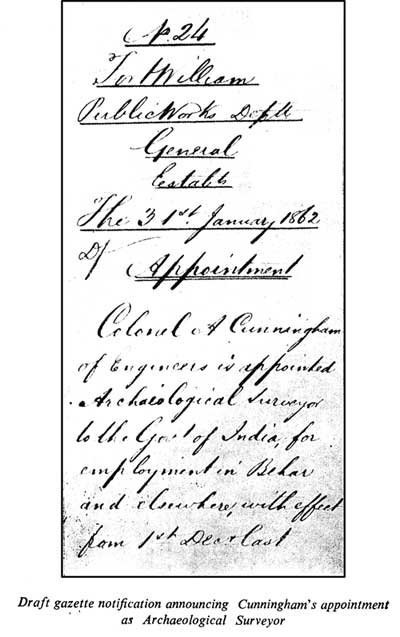
Letter dated 31 January 1862, appointing Cunningham as Surveyor General

Following his retirement from the Royal Engineers in 1861, Lord Canning, then Viceroy of India, appointed Cunningham as an archaeological surveyor to the Government of India. He held this position from 1861 to 1865, but it was then terminated through lack of funds.

Most antiquarians of the 19th century who took interest in identifying the major cities mentioned in ancient Indian texts, did so by putting together clues found in classical Graeco-Roman chronicles and the travelogues of travellers to India such as Xuanzang and Faxian. Cunningham was able to identify some of the places mentioned by Xuanzang, and counted among his major achievements the identification of Aornos, Ahichchhatra, Bairat, Kosambi, Nalanda, Padmavati, Sangala, Sankisa, Shravasti, Srughna, Taxila, and Vaishali. Unlike his contemporaries, Cunningham would also routinely confirm his identifications through field surveys. The identification of Taxila, in particular, was made difficult partly due to errors in the distances recorded by Pliny in his Naturalis Historia which pointed to a location somewhere on the Haro River, a two-day march from the Indus. Cunningham noticed that this position did not tally with the itineraries of Chinese pilgrims and in particular, the descriptions provided by Xuanzang. Unlike Pliny, these sources noted that the journey to Taxila from the Indus took three days and not two and therefore, suggested a different location for the city. Cunningham's subsequent explorations in 1863–64 of a site at Shah-dheri convinced him that his hypothesis was correct.

Now as Hwen Thsang, on his return to China, was accompanied by laden elephants, his three days' journey from Takhshasila [sic] to the Indus at Utakhanda, or Ohind, must necessarily have been of the same length as those of modern days, and, consequently, the site of the city must be looked for somewhere in the neighbourhood of Kâla-ka-sarâi. This site is found near Shah-dheri, just one mile to the north-east of Kâla-ka-sarâi, in the extensive ruins of a fortified city, around which I was able to trace no less than 55 stupas, of which two are as large as the great Manikyala tope, twenty-eight monasteries, and nine temples.

— Alexander Cunningham,

After his department was abolished in 1865, Cunningham returned to England and wrote the first part of his Ancient Geography of India (1871), covering the Buddhist period; but failed to complete the second part, covering the Muslim period. During this period in London he worked as director of the Delhi and London Bank. In 1870, Lord Mayo re-established the Archaeological Survey of India, with Cunningham as its director-general from 1 January 1871. Cunningham returned to India and made field explorations each winter, conducting excavations and surveys from Taxila to Gaur. He produced twenty-four reports, thirteen as author and the rest under his supervision by others such as J. D. Beglar. Other major works included the first volume of Corpus Inscriptionum Indicarum (1877) which included copies of the edicts of Ashoka, The Stupa of Bharhut (1879) and the Book of Indian Eras (1883) which allowed the dating of Indian antiquities. He retired from the Archaeological Survey on 30 September 1885 and returned to London to continue his research and writing.

== Archaeological methodology ==
Cunningham relied heavily on historical and textual sources, especially the travelogues of the Chinese pilgrims Xuanzang and Faxian, to locate sites. He depended on these accounts for directions and to match written descriptions with surrounding geography. As well as locating ancient sites, Cunningham attempted to match what was written in the travelogues with the ancient ruins he encountered, allowing him to identify them.

Cunningham's stops at each site were hurried, as he could visit up to thirty sites in each season. On arrival, he and his team of labourers would clear the jungle, and search for coins, inscriptions, and sculptures. His excavations consisted of haphazard probing, or inserting a pole vertically, and digging for objects of value.

Cunningham's surveys consisted of the documentation of locations, measurements, and inscriptions. He placed emphasis on meticulously recording and mapping the ancient sites, as opposed to simply collecting artefacts. He produced extensive reports through the Archaeological Survey of India that organised information about monuments, stupas, temples and ruins in a structured and methodical manner.

== Father of Indian archaeology ==
Cunningham provided the Archaeological Survey of India with much-needed organization and expertise after he left the Army in 1861. In his capacity as the first Director General, he carried out excavations in significant ancient towns, issued thirty volumes of archaeological papers, and assessed over 725 sites. He is regarded as the founder of archaeology in India because:

- He is regarded as the father of Indian archaeology since he was the first to use archaeological data to reconstruct ancient Indian history in a methodical manner.
- His thorough excavations at locations like Sanchi, Sarnath, and Bharhut produced priceless artifacts and inscriptions that expanded our understanding of the dissemination of Buddhism.
- Many others were motivated to pursue a career in archaeology by his authoritative references found in the Reports of the ASI. The pioneer of Indian prehistoric archaeology,
- Cunningham established techniques for documenting, mapping, photography, and conservation that are still in use today.
- For the first time, Indians were involved in archaeology thanks to his training of indigenous assistants that he hired for digs.
- Cunningham made sure archaeology got financing and formal recognition, which helped to establish the field's legitimacy in India.

== Numismatic interests ==
Cunningham assembled a large numismatic collection, but much of this was lost when the steamship he was travelling in, the Indus, was wrecked off the coast of Ceylon in November 1884. The British Museum, however, obtained most of the gold and silver coins. He had suggested to the Museum that they should use the arch from the Sanchi Stupa to mark the entrance of a new section on Indian history. He also published numerous papers in the Journal of the Asiatic Society and the Numismatic Chronicle.

== Family and personal life ==
Two of Cunningham's brothers, Francis and Joseph, became well known for their work in British India; while another, Peter, became famous for his Handbook of London (1849). Cunningham married Alicia Maria Whish, daughter of Martin Whish, B.C.S., on 30 March 1840. The couple had two sons, Lieutenant-Colonel Allan J. C. Cunningham (1842–1928) of the Bengal and Royal Engineers, and Sir Alexander F. D. Cunningham (1852–1935) of the Indian Civil Service. Cunningham died on 28 November 1893, at his home in South Kensington and was buried at Kensal Green Cemetery, London. His wife predeceased him, in 1870. He was survived by his two sons.

== Awards and memorials ==
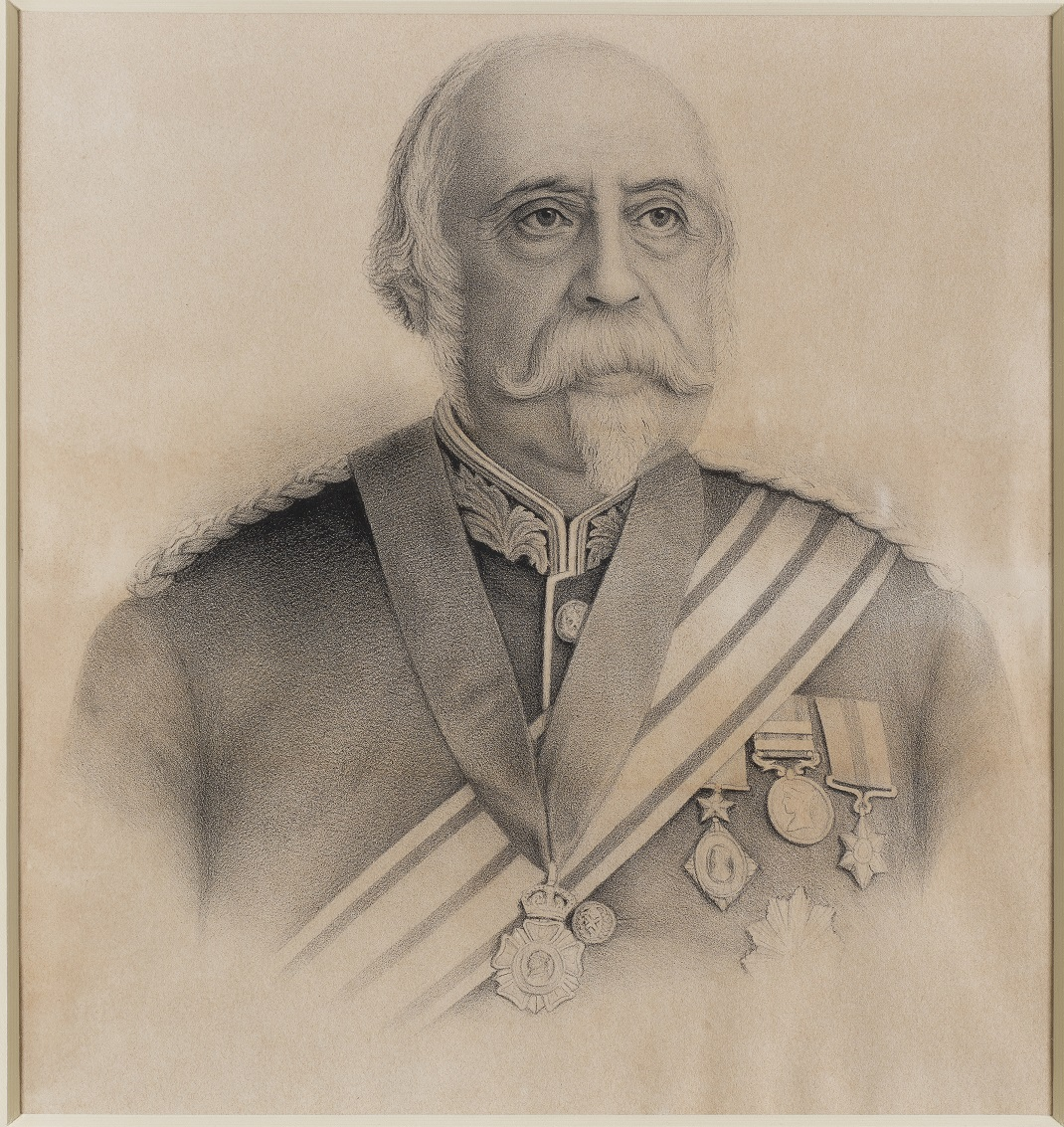
Portrait of Cunningham by C. W. Walton, showing him wearing the badge of a KCIE, with other decorations.

Cunningham was awarded the CSI on 20 May 1870 and CIE in 1878. In 1887, he was made a Knight Commander of the Order of the Indian Empire.

== Publications ==
Books written by Cunningham include:

- LADĀK: Physical, Statistical, and Historical with Notices of the Surrounding Countries (1854).
- Bhilsa Topes (1854), a history of Buddhism
- The Ancient Geography of India (1871)
- Archaeological Survey Of India Vol. 1 (1871) Four Reports Made During the Years, 1862-63-64-65, Volume 1 (1871)
- Archaeological Survey Of India Vol. 2
- Archaeological Survey Of India Vol. 3 (1873)
- Corpus Inscriptionum Indicarum. Volume 1. (1877)
- The Stupa of Bharhut: A Buddhist Monument Ornamented with Numerous Sculptures Illustrative of Buddhist Legend and History in the Third Century B.C. (1879)
- The Book of Indian Eras (1883)
- Coins of Ancient India (1891)
- Mahâbodhi, or the great Buddhist temple under the Bodhi tree at Buddha-Gaya (1892)
- Coins of Medieval India (1894)
- Report of Tour in Eastern Rajputana

Additional works:

- The World of India’s First Archaeologist: Letters from Alexander Cunningham to J.D.M. Beglar; Oxford University Press: Upinder Singh.
- Imam, Abu (1963). Sir Alexander Cunningham and the Beginnings of Indian Archeology (Thesis). doi:10.25501/SOAS.00033626. OCLC 966141480.

== See also ==
- Joseph David Beglar
- Sir Edward Clive Bayley
- Sir John Hubert Marshall
