= Francis Cunningham (Indian Army officer) =

Madras Army officer

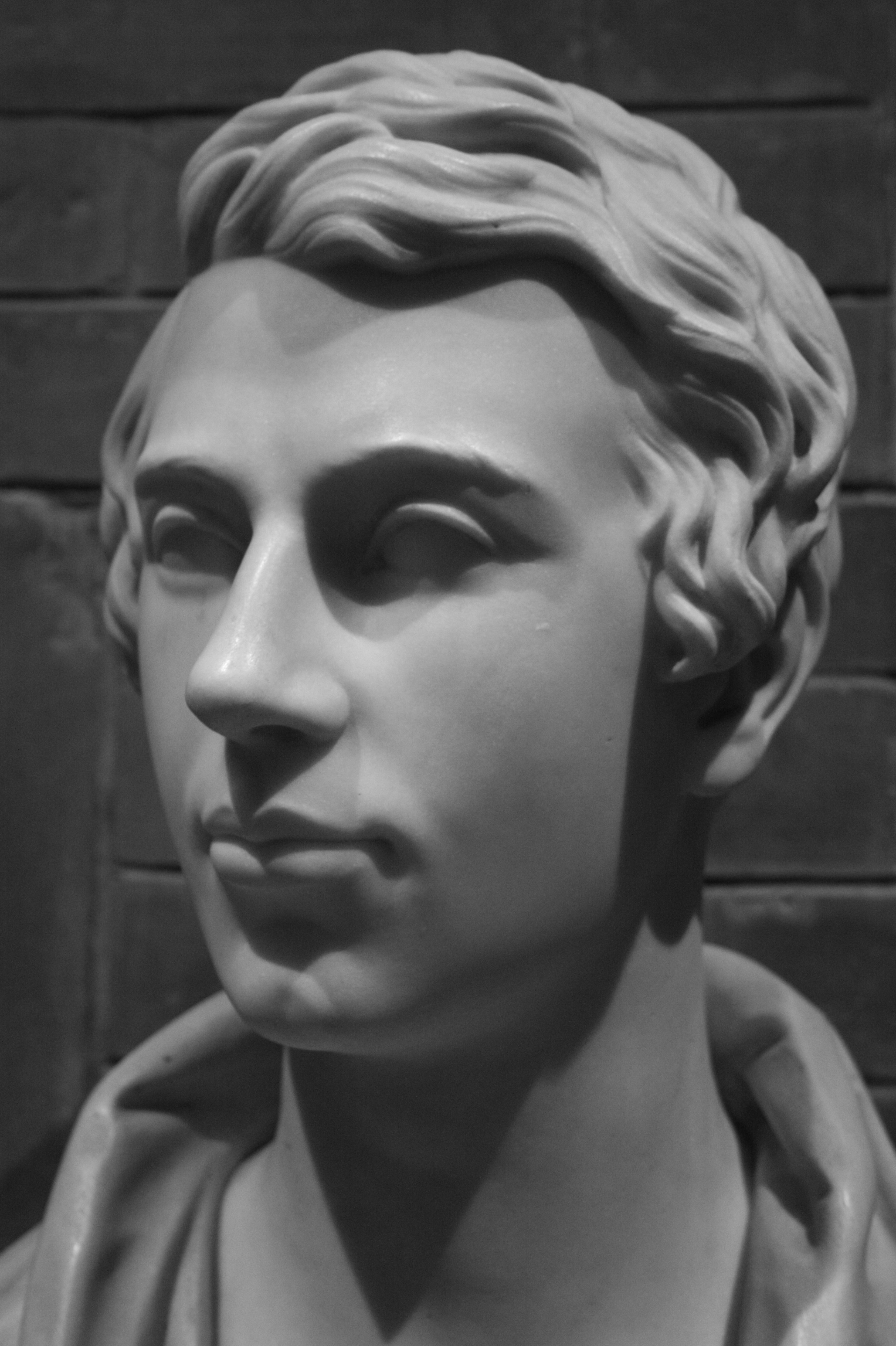
Francis Cunningham (aged 20) by Sir Francis Chantrey

Francis Cunningham (1820 – 3 December 1875) was an officer in the Madras Army, member of the Mysore Commission as secretary to Mark Cubbon, and a literary editor. He published a three volume revised edition of Gifford's Works of Ben Jonson in 1871. Cunningham road in Bangalore is named after him.

== Life ==
Francis Cunningham was the son of the poet Allan Cunningham and the younger brother of historian Joseph Davey (1812–1851, who wrote on the History of the Sikhs), (1816–1869), author and literary editor and archaeologist Sir Alexander Cunningham (1814–1893, who founded the Archaeological Survey of India), who also spent most of their working lives in India. His younger brother Peter Cunningham (1816–1869) also became a literary editor, best known for his Handbook of London.

The brothers' cadetships were obtained through a friend of their father's, Sir Walter Scott, who was extremely friendly with Robert Dundas and others with a Scottish background who had been or were at the Board of Control. After undergoing training at the Military Seminary of the British East India Company at Addiscombe, then in Surrey, Francis was gazetted as an Ensign and posted to the 23rd Madras Native Infantry in 1838. He then joined the Shah's Sappers to Kabul to support Lord Auckland's campaign to set up Shah Shuja in Afghanistan. Cunningham distinguished himself as a Field Engineer, with Robert Sale at Jalalabad, during the 1st Afghan War. After the withdrawal of the forces in 1850, he was placed by Lord Ellenborough in the Mysore commission and posted in Bangalore where he stayed for the remained of his career in India. He was known for his hospitality and for maintaining a large private library. As Secretary to the Mysore Commission and a deputy to Sir Mark Cubbon, the Chief Commissioner at Bangalore he played an active role in the development of Bangalore including the Horticultural Gardens at Lalbagh, constructions including the one he built for Sir Mark Cubbon in the nearby Nandi Hills and possibly, a large bungalow called the Balabrooie. Unfortunately, documentation on this period of Bangalore's history is sparse.

When Cubbon retired and left Bangalore in 1861, Cunningham stayed on in a private capacity but his health declined, lobbying on behalf of the deposed Maharaja Krishna Rajendra Wodeyar III, arguing that he should be allowed to adopt an heir and that the kingdom should be restored to him. As Cunningham was an extremely effective writer, this caused endless headaches for the next Chief Commissioner, Lewin Bentham Bowring. Bowring writes: 'During many years, the secretary of the commission was Captain F. Cunningham, a son of the poet Allan Cunningham, and a brother of the well known archaeologist General A. Cunningham, and of Major J.D. Cunningham who wrote the 'History of the Sikhs.' He wielded a ready and incisive pen, his official letters showing great command of language, in which was often a vein of irony and humour that was unpalatable to the recipients. He had left the commission before I joined, but had taken service with the Raja at Mysore, his principal duty being to compose the despatches which His Highness sent to the Government about his claims, a task which his literary qualifications enabled him to perform exceedingly well, although his presence at the capital and the encouragement given by him to intriguing parties were a source of some embarrassment to me...'

Cunningham returned to England and settled at 18 Clarendon Road, Kensington, where his house was filled with books and rare pictures including four 1798 pencil drawings of Charles Lamb, S. T. Coleridge, Robert Southey, and William Wordsworth. These later went to the British Library. He pursued his literary activity, editing the works of Kit Marlowe in 1870 and Philip Massinger and Ben Jonson in 1872. His obituary in The Athenaeum by A.H. Bullen praised him for revising and reissuing William Gifford's 1816 text of Ben Jonson. Later editors C.H. Herford, Percy and Evelyn Simpson however found fault in Cunningham's text. Cunningham had made corrections but simply reprinted Gifford's errors of 1875 and added a list of supplementary notes. He was also accused of not reading the manuscripts carefully and getting them in the wrong sequence. Cunningham however received praise for including William Drummond's Conversations with Ben Jonson. Toward the end of his life he was working on a new edition of his brother Peter Cunningham's Handbook to London. He died on 3 December 1875.

A marble bust of Francis Cunningham by the sculptor Francis Leggatt Chantrey (who was assisted by Francis Cunningham's father.) exists in the Scottish National Portrait Gallery. Cunningham Road in Bangalore is named after him. Given the significant roles that the Cunningham siblings have played in Indian history, this road might well be considered a tribute to the entire family.
