= Peter Cunningham (British writer) =

British writer (1816–1869)

Peter Cunningham FSA
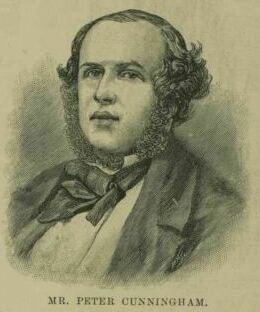
- Peter Cunningham, when he contributed the London Evening News
- Born: Peter Nicolas Cunningham; 1 April 1816; Pimlico, England
- Died: 18 May 1869 (aged 53); St. Albans, England
- Occupation: Writer
- Partner: Zenobia Martin
- Children: Edith Cunningham; Norah Cunningham; Walter Cunningham
- Parents: Allan Cunningham (father); Jean Walker (mother)
- Relatives: Francis Cunningham (brother); Joseph Davey Cunningham (brother); Alexander Cunningham (brother)

Peter Nicolas Cunningham FSA (1 April 1816 – 18 May 1869) was a British writer born in London, son of the Scottish author Allan Cunningham and his wife Jean (née Walker, 1791–1866). Cunningham published several topographical and biographical studies, of which the most important are his Handbook of London (1849) and The Life of Drummond of Hawthornden (1833). He edited Extracts from the Accounts of the Revels at Court in the Reigns of Elizabeth and James I (1842) and Horace Walpole's Letters (1857).

In 1851, he appeared in an amateur production of a play Not So Bad As We Seem by Edward Bulwer-Lytton along with Charles Dickens, Wilkie Collins, Mark Lemon, John Tenniel, Douglas Jerrold and others.

== Family ==
Cunningham married Zenobia Martin (1816–1901). They had three children Edith, Norah, and Walter Cunningham (1850–1936).
