= Not So Bad as We Seem =

1851 play

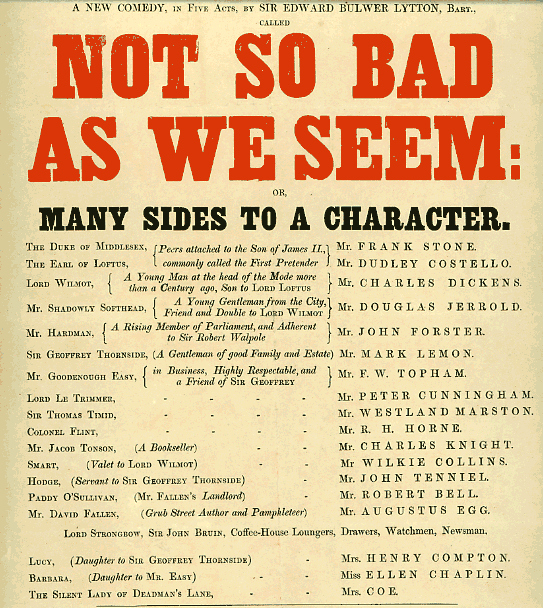
- Playbill for the first performance (detail)
- Original language: English
- Written by: Edward Bulwer-Lytton
- Genre: Comedy

Premiere
- Date: 16 May 1851
- Place: Devonshire House, London

Not So Bad as We Seem, Or, Many Sides to a Character: A Comedy in Five Acts was a play written by Sir Edward Bulwer-Lytton in 1851, and performed the same year as a charity event to benefit the Guild of Literature and Art, a charitable society for authors and artists. The male roles were taken by an array of well-known figures from the worlds of literature and the visual arts, including the novelists Charles Dickens and Wilkie Collins, Punch editor Mark Lemon, the artists Augustus Egg, Frank Stone, F. W. Topham and John Tenniel, and the writers John Forster, Peter Cunningham, John Westland Marston, Richard Henry Horne, Dudley Costello and Douglas Jerrold. Charles Knight was a popular author and publisher. Dickens and Collins met for the first time during the production.

"Robert Bell" was probably Robert Charles Bell, a Scottish engraver, or perhaps his son, Robert P. Bell, a painter. "Mr Coe", who played "Smart" in some performances, and is credited as the prompter, was Thomas Coe (1822–1886), who acted small parts and worked as a stage manager at the Haymarket Theatre and elsewhere. "Mrs Coe", acting "The Silent Lady of Deadman's Lane", was presumably his wife.

Unlike the men, Ellen Chaplin and "Mrs Henry Compton" (Emmeline Catherine Montague (1823–1911) were professional actresses.

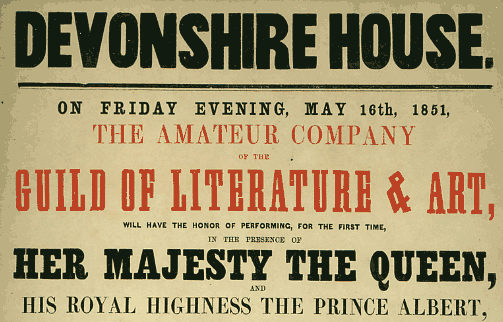
Top of the first night playbill

The first performance was on 16 May 1851, at Devonshire House on Piccadilly, which the Duke of Devonshire had agreed to make available for the night. The small, invited audience included Queen Victoria, who thought it "full of cleverness, though rather too long", and Prince Albert. But the Duke of Wellington had had enough by the end of the second act, and left. The production toured to Bath, Bristol and beyond, with a modified cast. Sir Joseph Paxton had designed a special collapsible stage, which was used at all venues. Edward Matthew Ward designed an elaborate engraved ticket.

According to a playbill poster in the Victoria and Albert Museum, the 12th performance was at the Free Trade Hall in Manchester on 11 February 1852. The cast was largely the same, but with Mr Coe taking the Earl of Loftus, and Miss Fanny Young the role of Barbara. The 19th performance was at the Lecture Hall, Derby on 25 August 1852, the play by now "compressed into three acts", but followed by a one-act Mr Nightingdale's Diary by Dickens and Lemon, then a short comic scene Two o'clock in the morning, translated from the French, and acted by Dickens and Lemon.

== Scenery ==
The painters of the ten scenery backdrops were also notable artists, with the largest number by "Mr Pitt", or William Pitt Senior, a longstanding London scene-painter, especially at the Lyceum Theatre. In 1853 he emigrated to Melbourne, Australia, where his career as an artist and publican flourished, his son William Pitt Junior (1855 – 1918) becoming a leading Australian architect. Painting scenery for the voracious London theatre market, which often required (as here) a large number of painted backdrops, was a well-established route for landscape painters to establish themselves; the best were well-paid.

Of the other painters, Thomas Grieve was a top scene painter, who established a firm, Grieve and Sons, and a dynasty. Grieve had worked with William Telbin (1812–1873) and John Absolon (1815–1895), notably on the huge exhibited panoramas that were a popular attraction of the period. Absolon was already escaping the scenery business and became a successful painter, mostly in watercolour. Clarkson Frederick Stanfield and David Roberts were already members of the Royal Academy, though both had worked, often together, as stage painters in the early part of their careers.

The Belgian Louis Haghe was a watercolourist, but mainly active, and very successful, running a lithography business, notably reproducing over 250 images by Roberts for his hit The Holy Land, Syria, Idumea, Arabia, Egypt, and Nubia in the 1840s.

== Ticket ==
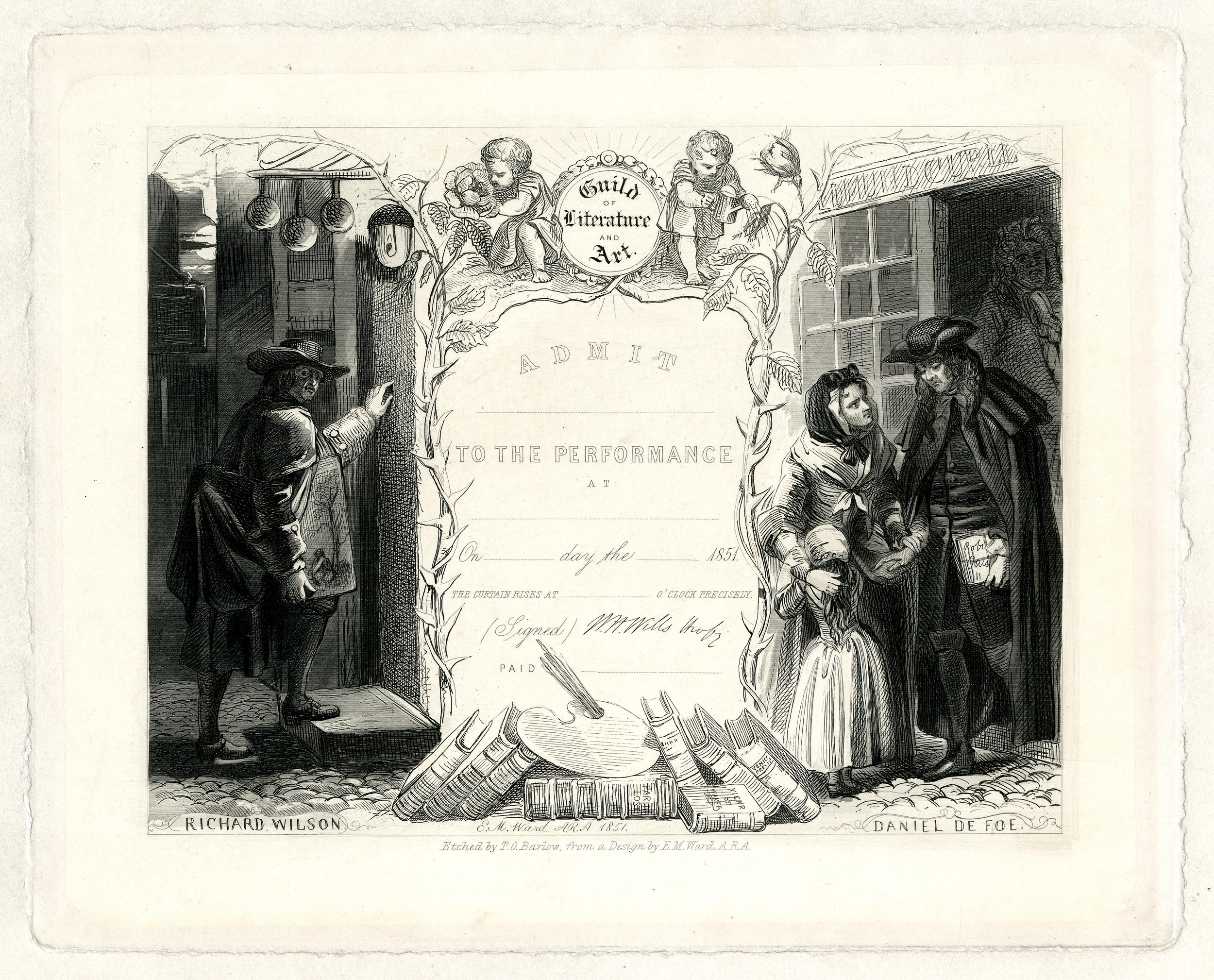
The printed ticket

An elaborate engraved ticket for performances was produced by the Guild of Literature and Art, leaving the details of play, time and place to be completed by hand. Edward Matthew Ward created the design, showing examples of 18th-century figures from the arts reduced to dire financial straits. On the left Richard Wilson enters a pawnshop with a painting under his arm, and on the right Daniel Defoe, carrying the manuscript of Robinson Crusoe in his pocket, leaves the shop of the publisher "Edmund Curll with a sad expression on his face, met by his worried wife and daughter".
