= Francis William Topham =

English watercolour-painter and engraver

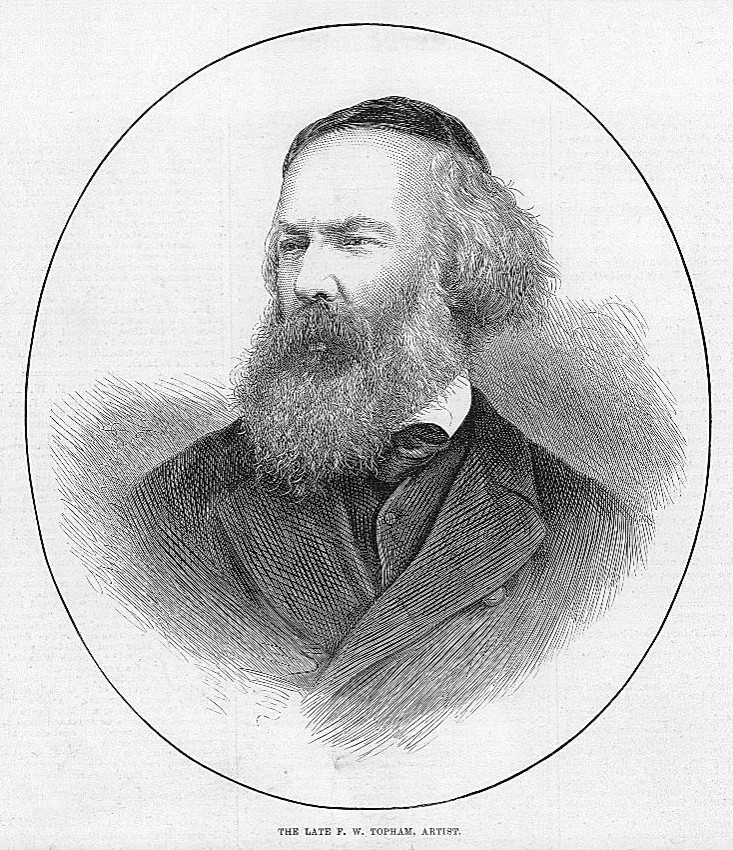
- Born: 15 April 1808; Leeds, United Kingdom
- Died: 31 March 1877 (aged 68); Córdoba, Andalusia, Spain
- Occupations: watercolourist, engraver
- Spouse: Mary Anne Beckwith (m. 1832)
- Children: 10

Francis William Topham (15 April 1808 – 31 March 1877) was an English painter, mainly in watercolour but also in oils, illustrator and engraver, mainly of figure subjects, especially peasants in Ireland, Spain and Italy. In 1848 he switched from the "New" to the "Old Watercolour Society", where his figure subjects were, like those of George Cattermole, especially welcomed as relieving the great predominance of landscape subjects in the Society's exhibitions.

His artistic career began as a line engraver in London in the 1830s, reproducing the designs of others, having started as a trainee engraver of lettering in Leeds. He trained himself to paint, in oils and watercolours, and continued to work in both media for some time, engraving book illustrations and for the illustrated "annuals" that were popular at this time.

== Life ==
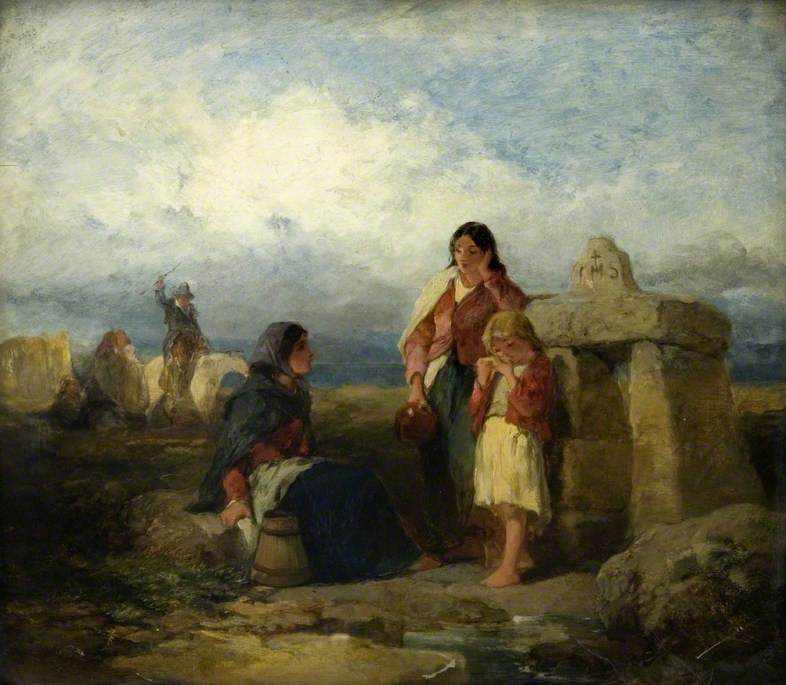
At the Holy Well, oils

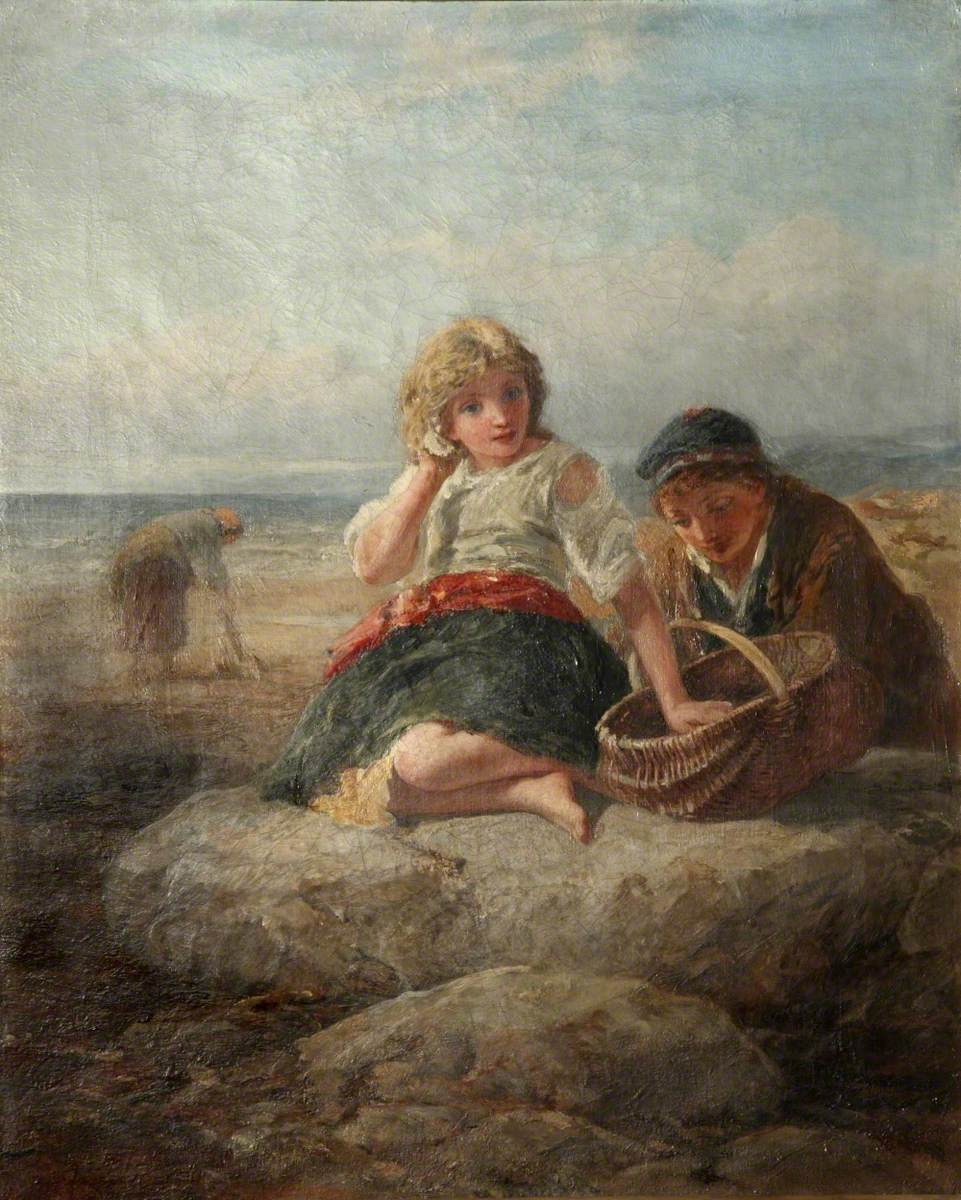
Voices of the Sea, oils, Walker Art Gallery

In his early life he was articled to an uncle who was a writing engraver. Around 1830 he came to London, and at first found employment in engraving coats-of-arms. He then entered the service of Messrs. Fenner & Sears, engravers and publishers. Moving employment to James Sprent Virtue, he engraved landscapes after William Henry Bartlett and Thomas Allom.

Topham's earliest exhibited work was The Rustic's Meal, which appeared at the Royal Academy in 1832, and was followed in 1838, 1840, and 1841 by three paintings in oil-colours. In 1842 he was elected an associate of the New Society of Painters in Watercolours (or "Royal Institution"), of which he became a full member in 1843. He retired, however, in 1847, and in 1848 was elected a member of the (Old) Society of Painters in Watercolours, to which he contributed a Welsh view near Capel Curig, and a subject from the Irish ballad of Rory O'More. His earlier works consisted chiefly of representations of Irish peasant life and studies of Wales and her people. These were diversified in 1850 by a scene from Dickens' Barnaby Rudge.

Topham first visited Ireland in 1844 and 1845, with Frederick Goodall and Alfred Fripp. His career as watercolourist appears to have started self-taught, helped by practice at the meetings of the Artists' Society in Clipstone Street. He was in 1850 one of Charles Dickens's company of actors (the "splendid strollers") in The Rent Day of Douglas Jerrold and Bulwer Lytton's Not So Bad as We Seem, performed before Queen Victoria. Towards the end of 1852 he went for a few months to Spain in search of the picturesque.

In the winter of 1876 Topham again went to Spain, dying in Córdoba in 1877, and was buried in the Protestant cemetery there.

== Works ==
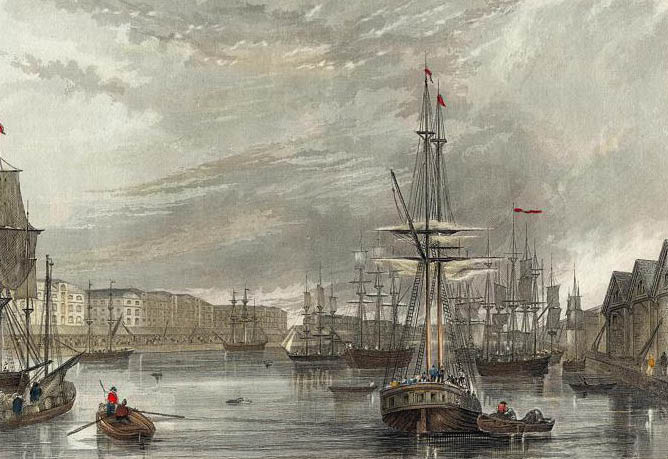
West India Dock (Import), 1837 engraving by Topham

Topham also made designs for Fisher, Son & Co.'s edition of the Waverley Novels, some of which he engraved. He drew on the wood illustrations for Pictures and Poems, 1846, Mrs. S. C. Hall's Midsummer Eve, 1848, Robert Burns's Poems, Thomas Moore's ‘'Melodies and Poems, Dickens's ‘'A Child's History of England, and other works.

The earliest of Topham's Spanish subjects appeared in 1854, when he exhibited Fortune Telling — Andalusia, and Spanish Gypsies 29,5 x 38,5 cm. These paintings were followed by The Andalusian Letter-Writer and The Posada in 1855, Spanish Card-players and Village Musicians in Brittany in 1857, Spanish Gossip in 1859, and others, mainly Spanish. In the autumn of 1860 he paid a return visit to Ireland, and in 1861 exhibited The Angel's Whisper and Irish Peasants at the Holy Well. In 1864 he began to exhibit Italian drawings, sending Italian Peasants and The Fountain at Capri, and in 1870 A Venetian Well.

By the end of his life his work could fetch very good prices, with several relatively small paintings recorded as selling for over £300 (over £30,000 in 2026).

Four of Topham's drawings, Galway Peasants, Irish Peasant Girl at the foot of a Cross, Peasants at a Fountain, Basses-Pyrénées, and South Weald Church, Essex, went to the South Kensington Museum. Several of his drawings were engraved:

- The Spinning Wheel and The Sisters at the Holy Well, by Francis Holl;
- Irish Courtship, by F. W. Bromley;
- Making Nets, by Thomas Oldham Barlow;
- The Mother's Blessing, by William Henry Simmons; and
- The Angel's Whisper, for The Art Journal of 1871, by C. W. Sharpe.

== Family ==
While with Fenner & Sears, Topham met Henry Beckwith the engraver, and married his sister Mary Anne Beckwith in 1832. They had ten children. Their son Frank William Warwick Topham (1838–1924) became known as a painter, of both genre and history subjects.

In 1873 he moved into a grand house in an eccentic neo-Gothic style at 4 Arkwright Road, Hampstead, London NW3, which now carries a blue plaque, not one of the standard and "official" blue plaques but erected by the Hampstead Plaque Fund.

== Notes ==
- Roget, John Lewis. A history of the 'Old Water-Colour' Society, 1891 (London, New York), Longmans, Green and Co., Vol II
