= Joseph Davey Cunningham =

British historian (1812–1851)

- Born: 9 June 1812; Lambeth
- Died: 28 February 1851 (aged 38); Ambala
- Occupations: Historian; Soldier
- Father: Allan Cunningham
- Relatives: Francis Cunningham (brother); Alexander Cunningham (brother); Peter Cunningham (brother)

Joseph Davey Cunningham (9 June 1812 – died 28 February 1851) was a British colonial soldier and the author of the book History of the Sikhs (1849) and an authority in Punjab historiography. His father was the Scottish poet and author Allan Cunningham and his brother was the archaeologist Sir Alexander Cunningham. His book was the first authentic English-language account of Sikh history. During the Anglo-Sikh wars, he was present at Bhaddowal, Aliwal and Sabhraon.

== Early life ==
Joseph Davey Cunningham was the eldest of five sons of Allan Cunningham. At an early age he was reported to have shown such an aptitude for mathematics that his father was advised to send him to Cambridge. However, since he desired to become a soldier, a cadetship in the British East India Company's service was procured for him, through the good offices of Sir Walter Scott. After a reported brilliant career at Addiscombe Military Academy (London Borough of Croydon, England), he sailed for India in 1834. Other sources state he migrated to India in 1832 or 1837.

== Career in India ==
He was first employed on the staff of the chief engineer of Bengal Presidency in 1834. In 1837, he was appointed assistant to Colonel Claude Wade, the political agent in Ludhiana on the Sikh Empire and Anglo-Afghan ties. For the next eight years he held and occupied several political positions in this area under Colonel Wade and his successors until 1845. At time of the outbreak of the first Anglo-Sikh War (December 1845), he was a political agent in the state of Bahawalpur.

Upon the commencement of the conflict, he was attached first to the staff of Sir Charles Napier and then to that of Sir Hugh Gough, Commander-in-chief in India. He was present, as political officer, with the division of Sir Harry Smith at the battles of Buddawal (22 January 1846) and Aliwal (28 January 1846). At Sobraon (10 February 1846), he served as an additional aide-de-camp to the Governor-General, Sir Henry Hardinge. His services earned him a brevet and the appointment of political agent to the state of Bhopal from 1846 to 1850. As per his tombstone, he was a captain of the Bengal Engineers.

Joseph lived amongst the Sikhs for eight years and conceived of writing a first-hand account of the Sikhs in 1844 and had access to reports amid other British sources and his own testimony, as he was an eyewitness to the two Anglo-Sikh wars. He published History of the Sikhs in Bhopal in 1849. The book consisted of nine-chapters divided into two parts: the first part (chapters 1–4) deals with the early Sikh history involving the Sikh gurus whilst the second part (chapters 5–9) deals entirely with Anglo-Sikh relations. The second edition of the book was published in 1853 after the death of Cunningham by his brother Peter Cunningham.

According to Cunningham, the British bested the Sikhs in the wars due to Dogra treason within the Sikh court, specifically Raja Lal Singh, Raja Tej Singh, and Gulab Singh. The book was noted for Cunningham's criticism of Sir Henry Hardinge's management of the Anglo-Sikh War and which then brought about his dismissal from political service since the views expressed in this work were anything but pleasing to his superiors. As a punishment, he was removed from his political appointment and sent back to regimental duty. The disgrace is reported to have hastened his death, and soon after his appointment to the Meerut Division of Public Works, he died at the city of Ambala, Punjab in 1851. His grave is located at the Christian Cemetery/European Cemetery on Jagadhari Road in Ambala Cantonment, with it being rediscovered in 2021 by a team of the Commonwealth War Graves Commission (CWGC).

== Views ==
Despite his authentic account on them, Cunningham had limited sympathetic view of Sikhs. He stated the following after being accused of being too sympathetic to the Sikhs, defending British-rule in India:

... the Sikhs, moreover, are so inferior to the English in resources and knowledge that there is no equality of comparison between them

— Joseph Davey Cunningham (1918). A History of the Sikhs from the Origin of the Nation to the Battles of the Sutlej, p. xxiii. H.L.O. Garrett, ed. London, Oxford University Press. Orig. publ. 1849.

== Publications ==
- Cunningham, Joseph Davey (1849). A History of the Sikhs, from the Origin of the Nation to the Battles of the Sutlej. London: J. Murray.

== Sources ==
- Stephen, Leslie, ed. (1888). "Cunningham, Joseph Davey" . Dictionary of National Biography. Vol. 13. London: Smith, Elder & Co.
