= Léon-François-Antoine Aurifeuille =

French mathematician

- Born: 1822
- Died: 1882 (aged 59–60)
- Scientific career
- Fields: Mathematics

Léon-François-Antoine Aurifeuille (1822–1882) was a French mathematician after whom Aurifeuillean factorizations are named.

He was the author of three books: Cours de géométrie élémentaire (with C. Richaud, Paris: Bachelier, 1847), Traité de géométrie élémentaire (with C. Dumont, 2nd ed., Toulouse: Bonnal & Gibrac, 1860), and Traité d'arithmétique (with C. Dumont, 2nd ed., Toulouse: Bonnal & Gibrac, 1859).

Under the pseudonym Alfred de Caston, he also wrote several other books, including Les Tricheurs, scènes de jeu (Paris: E. Dentu, 1863) and Les marchands de miracles; histoire de la superstition humaine (Paris: E. Dentu, 1864).
