= Allan J. C. Cunningham =

British-Indian mathematician

- Born: Allan Joseph Champneys Cunningham; 1842; Delhi, British India
- Died: 1928 (aged 86); London, United Kingdom
- Known for: Cunningham chain; Cunningham number; the Cunningham project
- Scientific career
- Fields: Number theory

Allan Joseph Champneys Cunningham (1842–1928) was a British-Indian mathematician.

== Biography ==
Born in Delhi, Cunningham was the son of Sir Alexander Cunningham, archaeologist and the founder of the Archaeological Survey of India. He started a military career with the East India Company's Bengal Engineers at a young age. From 1871 to 1881, he was instructor in mathematics at Thomason College of Civil Engineering which later became the Indian Institute Of Technology Roorkee (IIT Roorkee). Upon returning to the United Kingdom in 1881, he continued teaching at military institutes in Chatham, Dublin and Shorncliffe. He left the army in 1891. He spent the rest of his life studying number theory. He applied his expertise to finding factors of large numbers of the form a^{n} ± b^{n}, such as Mersenne numbers ($2^p-1$) and Fermat numbers ($2^{2^n}+1$) which have b = 1. His work is continued in the Cunningham project.
