= Sum of two cubes =

Mathematical polynomial formula

Visual proof of the formulas for the sum and difference of two cubes

In mathematics, the sum of two cubes is a cubed number added to another cubed number.

== Factorization ==
Every sum of two cubes may be factored according to the identity
$$a^3 + b^3 = (a + b)(a^2 - ab + b^2)$$
in elementary algebra.

Binomial numbers generalize this factorization to higher odd powers.

=== Proof ===
Starting with the expression, $a^2-ab+b^2$ and multiplying by a + b
$$(a+b)(a^2-ab+b^2) = a(a^2-ab+b^2) + b(a^2-ab+b^2).$$
distributing a and b over $a^2-ab+b^2$,
$$a^3 - a^2 b + ab^2 + a^2b - ab^2 + b^3$$
and canceling the like terms,
$$a^3 + b^3.$$

Similarly for the difference of two cubes,
$$\begin{align}
(a-b)(a^2+ab+b^2) & = a(a^2+ab+b^2) - b(a^2+ab+b^2) \\
& = a^3 + a^2 b + ab^2 \; - a^2b - ab^2 - b^3 \\
& = a^3 - b^3.
\end{align}$$

=== "SOAP" mnemonic ===
The mnemonic "SOAP", short for "Same, Opposite, Always Positive", helps recall of the signs:

	original sign		Same		Opposite		Always; Positive
a^{3}	+	b^{3} = (a	+	b)(a^{2}	−	ab	+	b^{2})
a^{3}	−	b^{3} = (a	−	b)(a^{2}	+	ab	+	b^{2})

== Fermat's Last Theorem ==
Fermat's Last Theorem in the case of exponent 3 states that the sum of two non-zero integer cubes does not result in a non-zero integer cube. The first recorded proof of the exponent 3 case was given by Euler.

== Taxicab and Cabtaxi numbers ==
A Taxicab number is the smallest positive number that can be expressed as a sum of two positive integer cubes in n distinct ways. The smallest taxicab number after Ta(1) = 2, is Ta(2) = 1729 (the Ramanujan number), expressed as

$1^3 +12^3$ or $9^3 + 10^3$

Ta(3), the smallest taxicab number expressed in 3 different ways, is 87,539,319, expressed as

$436^3 + 167^3$, $423^3 + 228^3$ or $414^3 + 255^3$

A Cabtaxi number is the smallest positive number that can be expressed as a sum of two integer cubes in n ways, allowing the cubes to be negative or zero as well as positive. The smallest cabtaxi number after Cabtaxi(1) = 0, is Cabtaxi(2) = 91, expressed as:

$3^3 + 4^3$ or $6^3 - 5^3$

Cabtaxi(3), the smallest Cabtaxi number expressed in 3 different ways, is 4104, expressed as

$16^3 + 2^3$, $15^3 + 9^3$ or $-12^3+18^3$

== See also ==
- Difference of two squares
- Binomial number
- Sophie Germain's identity
- Aurifeuillean factorization
- Fermat's Last Theorem
