= H. J. Woodall =

Herbert J. Woodall was a British mathematician, known as the namesake for the Woodall numbers.

In an 1889 publication, Woodall listed his affiliation as the Normal School of Science (now part of the Royal College of Science) in South Kensington. He was an Associate of the Royal College of Science, and taught physics at the Normal School from 1889 to 1892.

== Woodall numbers ==
A Woodall number is defined to be a number of the form $n\,2^n-1.$ If a prime number can be written in this form, it is then called a Woodall prime. The generalized Woodall numbers and generalized Woodall primes substitute any base $b\ge 2$ for the base 2.

Woodall first announced his work on factorization in a 1911 publication, acknowledging in it his communication on the subject with Allan J. C. Cunningham. In 1925 Cunningham and Woodall gathered together all that was known about the primality and factorization of the Woodall numbers and the generalized Woodall numbers with base 10, and published a small book of tables. Since then many mathematicians have continued the work of filling in these tables.
