= Allan Cunningham (author) =

Scottish poet and author (1784–1842)

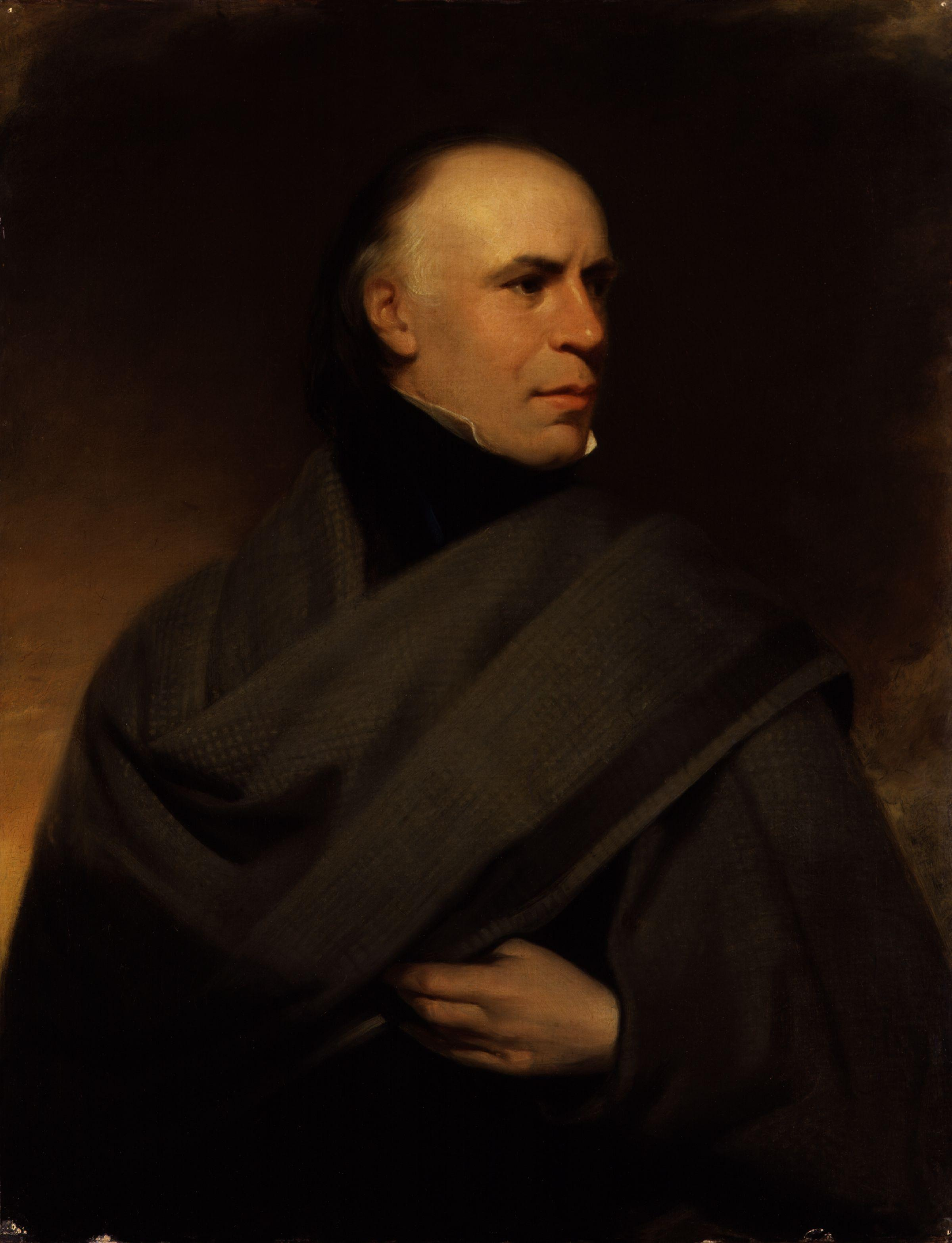
Allan Cunningham, Henry Room, c.1840

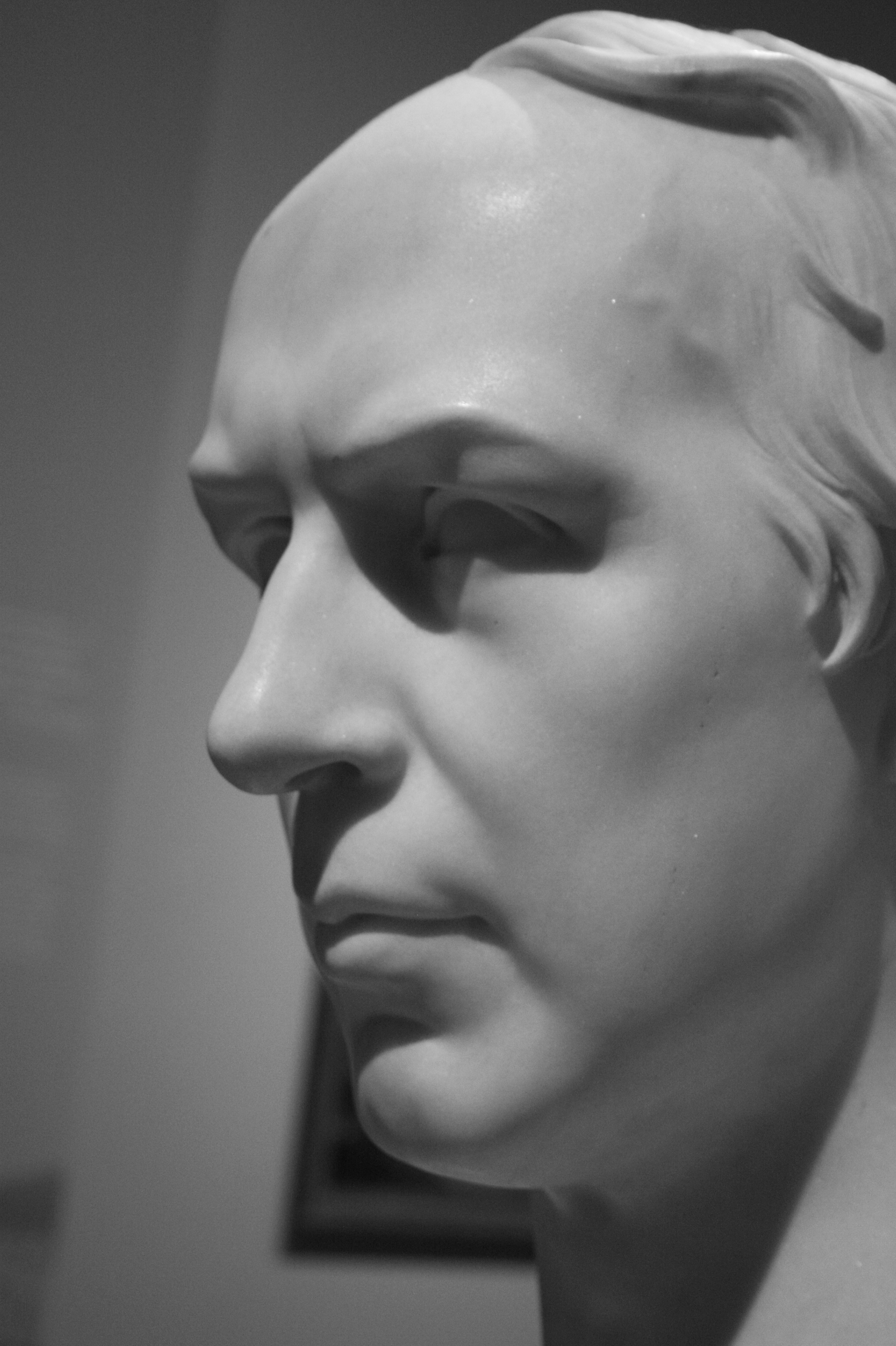
Bust of Allan Cunningham, by Henry Weekes, 1842

Allan Cunningham (7 December 1784 – 30 October 1842) was a Scottish poet and author.

== Life ==
He was born at Keir, near Dalswinton, Dumfries and Galloway, and first worked as a stonemason's apprentice. His father was a neighbour of Robert Burns at Ellisland, and Allan with his brother James visited James Hogg, the "Ettrick shepherd", who became a friend to both. Cunningham's other brothers were the naval surgeon Peter Miller Cunningham (1789–1864) and the poet, Thomas Mounsey Cunningham (1776–1834).

Cunningham gave his leisure to reading and writing imitations of old Scottish ballads. In 1809 he collected old ballads for Robert Hartley Cromek's Remains of Nithsdale and Galloway Song; he sent in, however, poems of his own, which the editor inserted, even though he may have suspected their real authorship. It gained for him the friendship of Walter Scott and James Hogg.

In 1810 Cunningham went to London, where he worked as a parliamentary reporter and journalist until 1814, when he became clerk of the works in the studio of the sculptor, Francis Chantrey, a post he kept until Chantrey's death in 1841.

== Works ==
Cunningham contributed some songs to Eugenius Roche's Literary Recreations in 1807. He wrote three novels, a life of Sir David Wilkie, and Lives of Eminent British Painters, Sculptors, and Architects (1829–33), that include biographies of William Hogarth, Sir Joshua Reynolds, Thomas Gainsborough and William Blake.

Besides these, he wrote many songs. A Wet Sheet and a Flowing Sea is a sea-song; and many other of Cunningham's songs became popular. He also brought out an edition of Robert Burns' Works.

Other works included:

- Sir Marmaduke Maxwell (1820) (play)
- The King of the Peak (1822), the story of Sir George Vernon and his daughter, Dorothy Vernon's supposed elopement with John Manners from Haddon Hall.
- The Maid of Elvar (1830) (a poem, in twelve parts)
- The Life and Correspondence of Robert Burns (1836)
- The Poems, Letters and Land of Robert Burns (1838), a new memoir of the poet and notices critical and biographical of his works

== Family ==
Cunningham was married to Jean Walker, who had been servant in a house where he lived, and they had five sons and one daughter, all of whom rose to important positions, and inherited in some degree his literary gifts. Among them were Joseph Davey Cunningham, Alexander Cunningham, Peter Cunningham and Francis Cunningham.

== See also ==
- Scottish literature
