= Sophie Germain's identity =

Mathematical polynomial factorization

In mathematics, Sophie Germain's identity is a polynomial factorization named after Sophie Germain stating that
$$\begin{align}
x^4 + 4y^4 &= \bigl((x + y)^2 + y^2\bigr)\cdot\bigl((x - y)^2 + y^2\bigr)\\
&= (x^2 + 2xy + 2y^2)\cdot(x^2 - 2xy + 2y^2).
\end{align}$$
Beyond its use in elementary algebra, it can also be used in number theory to factorize integers of the special form $x^4+4y^4$, and it frequently forms the basis of problems in mathematics competitions.

== History ==
Although the identity has been attributed to Sophie Germain, it does not appear in her works. Instead, in her works one can find the related identity
$$\begin{align}
x^4+y^4 &= (x^2-y^2)^2+2(xy)^2\\
&= (x^2+y^2)^2-2(xy)^2.\\
\end{align}$$
Modifying this equation by multiplying $y$ by $\sqrt2$ gives
$$x^4+4y^4 = (x^2+2y^2)^2-4(xy)^2,$$
a difference of two squares, from which Germain's identity follows. The inaccurate attribution of this identity to Germain was made by Leonard Eugene Dickson in his History of the Theory of Numbers, which also stated (equally inaccurately) that it could be found in a letter from Leonhard Euler to Christian Goldbach.

The identity can be proven simply by multiplying the two terms of the factorization together, and verifying that their product equals the right hand side of the equality. A proof without words is also possible based on multiple applications of the Pythagorean theorem.

== Applications to integer factorization ==
One consequence of Germain's identity is that the numbers of the form
$$n^4+4^n$$
cannot be prime for $n>1$. (For $n=1$, the result is the prime number 5.) They are obviously not prime if $n$ is even, and if $n$ is odd they have a factorization given by the identity with $x=n$ and $y=2^{(n-1)/2}$. These numbers (starting with $n=0$) form the integer sequence

1, 5, 32, 145, 512, 1649, 5392, 18785, 69632, ... (sequence A001589 in the OEIS).

Many of the appearances of Sophie Germain's identity in mathematics competitions come from this corollary of it.

Another special case of the identity with $x=1$ and $y=2^k$ can be used to produce the factorization
$$\begin{align}
\Phi_4(2^{2k+1})&=2^{4k+2}+1\\
&=(2^{2k+1}-2^{k+1}+1)\cdot (2^{2k+1}+2^{k+1}+1),\\
\end{align}$$
where $\Phi_4(x)=x^2+1$ is the fourth cyclotomic polynomial. As with the cyclotomic polynomials more generally, $\Phi_4$ is an irreducible polynomial, so this factorization of infinitely many of its values cannot be extended to a factorization of $\Phi_4$ as a polynomial, making this an example of an aurifeuillean factorization.

== Generalization ==
Germain's identity has been generalized to the functional equation
$$f(x)^2+4f(y)^2 = \bigl( f(x+y)+f(y) \bigr)\bigl(f(x-y)+f(y)\bigr),$$
which by Sophie Germain's identity is satisfied by the square function.
