= Thomas Mounsey Cunningham =

Scottish poet

Thomas Mounsey Cunningham (1776–1834) was a Scottish poet.

== Life ==
The second son of John Cunningham and Elizabeth Harley, daughter of a Dumfries merchant, he was born at Culfaud, Kirkcudbrightshire, on 25 June 1776. He was an elder brother of Allan Cunningham. He received his early education at a dame's school and the village school of Kellieston, after which he attended Dumfries Academy, where he acquired a knowledge of book-keeping and the elements of mathematics, French, and Latin.

At sixteen Cunningham became clerk to John Maxwell of Terraughty, but remained with him only a short time. He was next apprenticed to a millwright, and on the conclusion of his apprenticeship in 1797 found employment at Rotherham. His master having become bankrupt, he went to London, and was planning to emigrate to the West Indies, when he learned that his master had set up in business at King's Lynn in Norfolk, and joined him there. About 1800 he moved to Wiltshire, and soon afterwards to the neighbourhood of Cambridge.

In 1805 Cunningham was in Dover; going on to London, he found employment in the establishment of George Rennie the engineer. Subsequently he was for some time foreman superintendent of Fowler's chain cable manufactory, by London Docks; then in 1812 he again joined Rennie's establishment as a clerk, and rose to be the chief clerk.

Cunningham died on 28 October 1834 in Princes Street, Blackfriars Road, London.

== Works ==
At an early age Cunningham had begun to compose songs and poetry in Lallans, and in 1797 The Har'st Kirn (Harvest Home) was published in Brash and Reid's Poetry, original and selected. While at Cambridge he wrote: The Hills o' Gallowa, wrongly included in a collected edition of Robert Burns published by Orphoot at Edinburgh in 1820; a satirical poem entitled The Cambridgeshire Garland; and another that was similar, The Unco Grave.

In 1806 Cunningham began to contribute poetry to the Scots Magazine, his verse being mainly on Lowland country life. In 1809 he was invited by James Hogg to contribute to his Forest Minstrel. On the founding of the Edinburgh Magazine in 1817, he contributed to it poems and songs, and under the title Literary Legacy, prose sketches on society, stories and antiquarian topics. In the end he became discouraged as a writer.

== Notes ==
Attribution

This article incorporates text from a publication now in the public domain: Stephen, Leslie, ed. (1888). "Cunningham, Thomas Mounsey". Dictionary of National Biography. Vol. 13. London: Smith, Elder & Co.
