= Archibald Fullarton =

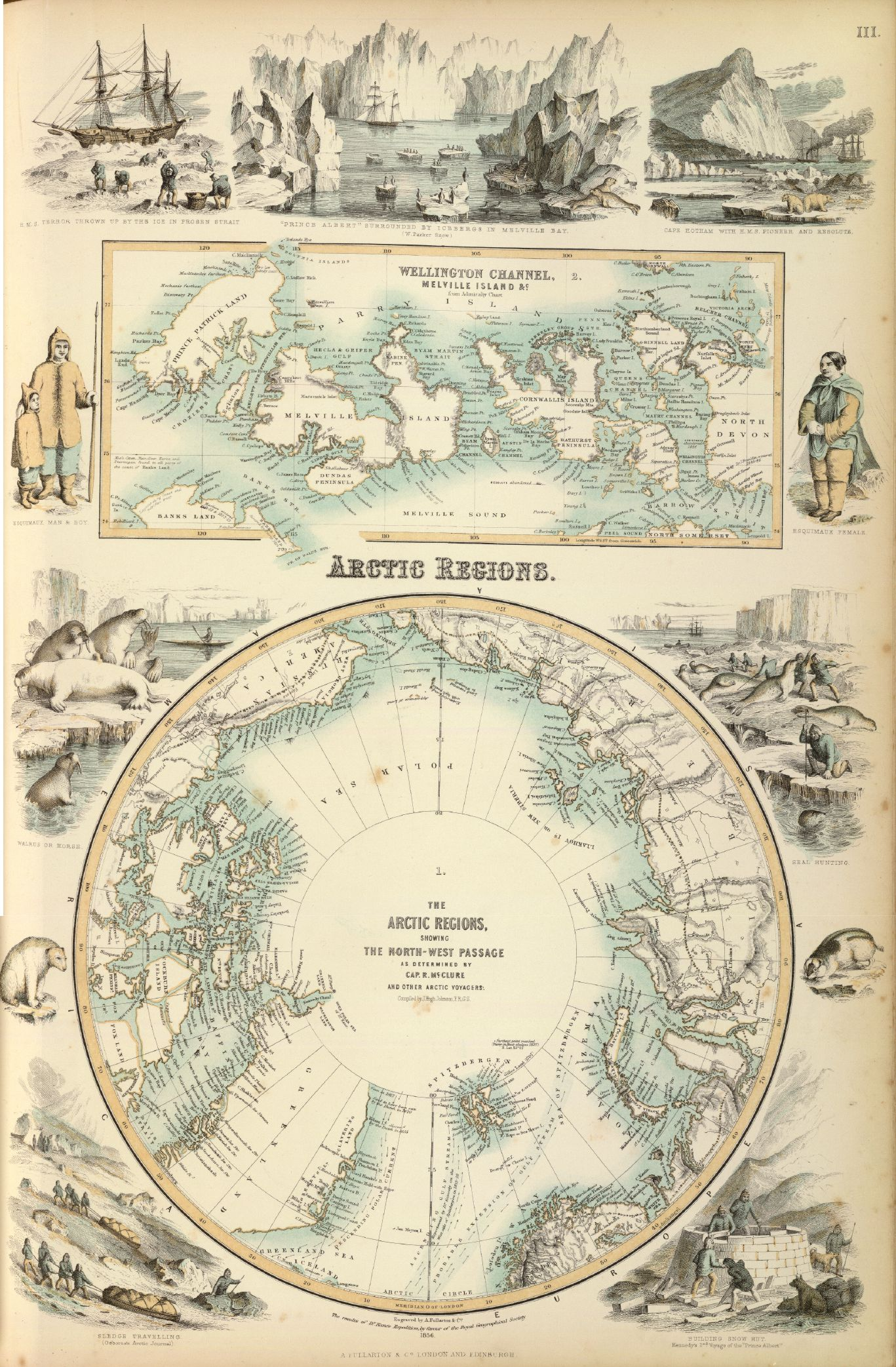
"Arctic Regions" from the Royal Illustrated Atlas (1872)

Archibald Fullarton and Co. was a prominent publisher in Glasgow in the 1800s, and maintained a prodigious output of books, atlases and maps.

== History ==
The company produced the last maps to boast decorative vignettes, often done by George Heriot Swanston, the Scottish cartographer and engraver. Fullarton was in partnership with John Blackie in Glasgow until 1831, when the stock, plant and agencies were equally shared out.

Fullarton's Parliamentary Gazetteer of England and Wales, was a set of finely engraved maps of the counties, recording the changes brought about by the Great Reform Bill, which was the basis of Britain's modern parliamentary constituencies, and went through a large numbers of editions. Some maps were engraved by Robert Scott, who made use of vignette views to decorate the map border. Another monumental work by the firm was the Royal Illustrated Atlas

James Bell (1769–1836) published his New and Comprehensive Gazetteer of England and Wales in 1833–34. Bell was a writer on geography who edited Rollin's Ancient History in 1828 and wrote a System of Geography in 1830. The maps in his gazetteer all bear the imprint of the publisher and were engraved by Gray and Son, Josiah Neele & Co or Robert Scott.

Fullarton republished extracts from Bell's Gazetteer in his Parliamentary Gazetteer, acknowledging that some material had been included. He was therefore angry at what he saw as an accusation of plagiarism and 'extremely disingenuous attempt to underrate the value and importance of their laborious and accurate Compilation' stating that 'these materials do not constitute one third part of the present Publication'.

James Bell had pirated the work of Samuel Lewis' Topographical Dictionary. Lewis obtained an injunction in 1839 and Bell's Gazetteer was withdrawn. Fullarton, who had been Bell's publisher, bought the plates, and issued the maps in his own Parliamentary Gazetteer.

Fullarton was also responsible for Rev. J. M. Wilson's Imperial Gazetteer of Scotland, its companion volume Imperial Gazetteer of England and Wales and Bartholomew's Imperial Map.

Another major work was A Gazetteer of the World: Or, Dictionary of Geographical Knowledge, edited by George Godfrey Cunningham, who was a partner at Fullarton, and published in 1856. This provided a concise description of towns, cities, provinces and countries around the world, all beyond the British Isles.

On 20 November 1809 Fullarton, William Sommerville and John Blackie entered into a partnership, taking over the business of publisher A. & W. D. Brownlie, where they had previously worked. Archibald Fullarton was made a Burgess and Guild Brother of Glasgow on 18 December 1815, as he had earlier married Jean, the daughter of John M'Naught, a weaver, who had served in the Glasgow Regiment.

== Publications ==
- Lawson, John Parker (1839). Historical Tales of the Wars of Scotland, And of the Border Raids, Forays and Conflicts. Vol. I. Edinburgh, London and Dublin: Archibald Fullarton.
- Lawson, John Parker (1839). Historical Tales of the Wars of Scotland, And of the Border Raids, Forays and Conflicts. Vol. II. Edinburgh, London and Dublin: Archibald Fullarton.
- Lawson, John Parker (1839). Historical Tales of the Wars of Scotland And of the Border Raids, Forays, and Conflicts. Vol. III. Edinburgh, London and Dublin: A. Fullarton.
- Lawson, John Parker (1839). Historical Tales of the Wars of Scotland And of the Border Raids, Forays, and Conflicts. Vol. IV. Edinburgh, London and Dublin: A. Fullarton.
- Browne, James (1840). A History of the Highlands and of the Highland Clans. Vol. 1. Glasgow: A. Fullarton & Co.
- Browne, James (1852). A History of the Highlands and of the Highland Clans. Vol. 2. Glasgow: A. Fullarton & Co.
- Anderson, William (1867), The Scottish Nation; or, The Surnames, Families, Literature, Honours, and Biographical History of the People of Scotland, vol. I, 44 South Bridge, Edinburgh and 115 Newgate Street, London: A. Fullarton & Co
- Anderson, William (1862), The Scottish Nation; or, The Surnames, Families, Literature, Honours, and Biographical History of the People of Scotland, vol. II, 44 South Bridge, Edinburgh and 115 Newgate Street, London: A. Fullarton & Co
- Keltie, John Scott; Maclauchlan, Thomas; Browne, James; Wilson, John (1875). A history of the Scottish Highlands, Highland clans and Highland regiments. Sterling and Francine Clark Art Institute Library. Edinburgh; London: Fullarton.
- Anderson, William (1878). The Scottish Nation; or, The Surnames, Families, Literature, Honours, and Biographical History of the People of Scotland. Vol. III. 13 Blair Street, Edinburgh and 45 Ludgate Hill, London: A. Fullarton & Co.

== See also ==
- Archibald Constable
- Thomas Constable (printer and publisher)
- George Washington Bacon
