= John Struthers (poet) =

Scottish poet and writer

John Struthers (18 July 1776 – 30 July 1853) was a Scottish poet and miscellaneous writer.

== Early life ==
John Struthers was born in East Kilbride, Lanarkshire on 18 July 1776, the son of a shoemaker. Initially educated at home, he was sent to the local school at eight and although the local teacher saw his potential, the family circumstances meant that at the age of nine he was working as a cow-herd. He eventually became a farm labourer and took various positions until he learnt the art of making fine shoes at the prestigious Glasgow firm of Jenkin and Smith in 1793. Iniatally he made his shoes from his home in Anderson, near Glasgow and took the completed shoes in once a fortnight. In 1798 he was married and had a pretty cottage in the village. In 1801, he decided to publish privately a small book of poems. After publication he seems to have got very embarrassed and had all the copies that had not found owners destroyed. He described his feelings about this event – "Ignorant of printing and still more of publishing, I had not the common sense to consult anyone upon the subject".

== Poor Man's Sabbath ==
Sometime around 1803 he wrote 'A Poor Man's Sabbath', but anxious not to publish hastily again he lay around for a year. In 1804, a couple of acquaintances told him that they were anxious to see the poem in print. He had the poem printed off by Mr William Lang who had it "beautifully and correctly printed on a stout and fine foolscap extending to 32 pages having neither preface or note". The price of the printing was 4½d per copy and Lang thought he could ask no more than 6d a copy. So Struthers left the printers "With the whole edition formed into a small parcel, which I carried below my arm". His first port of call was a bookseller he had known for some time called Brash. Mr Brash read the first few verses, liked it and bought 2 dozen copies. He suggested another Glasgow bookseller, Mr Ogle who might also be interested. Struthers took the poem to that bookseller but he was rude and insulting about the work, hardly bothering to read it. Despite this he bought 6 copies and by selling another 6 to shoemakers on his way home, he had sold 3 dozen by the end of the day. 10 days later when he was looking in Ogle's window, he was beckoned inside, where Mr Ogle's attitude had taken on a great change. He asked whether there were any copies left and offered to take the whole edition at 6d a time. He would also take any unsold stock off any other booksellers. The deal was done, and as Brash was the only other to hold the book, he went to ask after any unsold copies. Mr Brash was most amused at Ogles antics and the naivety of the author. He brought out an article from an Edinburgh periodical the previous week that gave the poem a glowing review. In 1808, Struthers was visited in his house by his childhood teacher, Joanna Baillie, who suggested a 3rd edition printed in a better style than the previous 2 editions. She asked him to add some stanza's. a preface and some additional poems. Through Walter Scott they got an agreement from Archibald Constable for £30 to be paid for an edition of 1000 copies.

== Peasant's Death ==
In 1806 he finished 'The Peasant's Death', which was intended as a sequel to 'The Poor Man's Sabbath'. It was printed again for Mr Ogle and on the same terms as before, which means that Struthers would make very little money from the book. In 1808, he was in Edinburgh and for the first time met Sir Walter Scott. Although he felt that most of the thanks for the printing of the 3rd edition of 'The Poor Man's Sabbath' was due to Joanna Baillie, it was good manners to go and thank Scott for the effort that he had made on his behalf, and for getting him a generous fee. They got on well and would go on meeting when Struthers went into Edinburgh, but he rejected the many invitations to visit Ashestiel or later Abbotsford. In 1809 he found himself out of the job he had kept for a number of years. These years were times of much change and unrest and this had been especially true in the shoemaking trade. There had been a number of strikes by jobbing shoemakers, that is those who were paid a salary. Despite the exhortations of the organizers, Struthers had always refused to join the strikes. In 1809 the firm at which he worked entered into a closed shop agreement with the union. Struthers was totally opposed to Union activity and there was no way he was going to join, so he was forced to leave. His only alternative was to work on his own from home in his small house. He had always been opposed to self-employment, but now he had no choice. After a year he took a shop, but a year later he had given that up commenting "the experience of what it is to keep an open door, I thought rather dear".

== Later work ==
In 1811 he completed 'A Winters Day', which was printed privately with some success and in 1816 he wrote 'An Essay on the State of the Labouring Poor'. The work caused considerable correspondence for Struthers. One of the correspondents was Mr Archibald Fullarton of the firm Khull, Blackie & Co who asked his permission to print a cheap edition for circulation among that class of the community for whose benefit it was more immediately intended. The pamphlet was reduced from 18d to a groat. For the working man however the work held no charms. In 1818 'The Plough' was printed by Robert Chapman and was well received by the public. He also produced a volume of poems by William Muir, of which he edited and added a preface and saw through the press. The work died without a trace. Fullarton asked Struthers to edit a collection of songs. He did this reluctantly, thinking himself unqualified for the job. The result was 'The Harp of Caledonia' which came out in 3 volumes in 1819. It included songs by Sir Walter Scott and Joanna Baillie. In 1819 he gave up shoemaking and joined the firm of Khull, Blackie and Co. His jobs were of a most general kind including a little proof reading or editing. At the request of Fullarton he wrote 'The History of Scotland from the Union to 1827'. He intended to add a third volume, but this was never finished. He worked for 18 months on Scottish biographies, many of which appeared in Chambers 'Eminent Scotsmen'. In 1829 the firm of Khull and Blackie was broken up and Struthers found himself without employment. In 1832 took a post as librarian at Stirling's Public Library in Glasgow, a post he held for another thirteen years.

He died on 30 July 1853.

== Works ==
=== Poetry ===
- Poems on various subjects 1801. Glasgow
- The Poor Man's Sabbath 1804. Glasgow
- The Peasant's Death; or, a visit to the house of mourning; and other poems 1806. Glasgow
- The Winters Day, with other poems 1811. Glasgow
- Poems, moral and religious 1814. Glasgow
- The Plough, and other poems 1818. Edinburgh
- Poems by John Struthers, 3 vols, 1824-26. Glasgow
- Dychmont: A poem 1836. Glasgow
- The Poetical Works of John Struthers, with autobiography 1850. London

=== Miscellaneous work ===
- An Essay on the State of the Labouring Poor, with some hints for its improvement 1816. Glasgow
- The History of Scotland, from the Union to the abolition of the heritable jurisdictions in 1748 1827. Glasgow
- Tekel; an examination of the Rev. Mr. Andrew Marshall's sermon, entitled Ecclesiastical establishments considered, and letter to the late Dr. Andrew Thomson 1831. Glasgow
- Scripture Grounds for a National Church, and a National Profession of Christianity: in a letter to a friend By a Layman. 1836. Glasgow

=== Works as editor ===
- The Harp of Caledonia: a collection of songs, ancient and modern, chiefly Scottish. With an essay on Scottish song writers 1819. Glasgow
- The British minstrel; a selection of ballads, ancient and modern / with notes biographical and critical 1821 Glasgow
