= John Smith of Grothill =

Scottish landowner and merchant

Sir John Smith of Grothill and Kings Cramond (c. 1600 – c. 1675) was a 17th-century Scottish landowner and merchant who served as Lord Provost of Edinburgh from 1643 to 1646.

== Life ==
He was the son of Robert Smith and Gillis Mowbray, a daughter of John Mowbray of Barnbougle.

In 1634 he is first referred to as "John Smith of Grothill" in the purchase of the Southfield estate (south of Edinburgh) from William Adamson of Craigcrook (his close neighbour). Grant alternatively places him at Groat Hall, a mansion to the west near Craigleith.

As a burgess of Edinburgh he and one other (Hugh Kennedy of Ayr) were dispatched to London to settle the Treaty of London in 1641. He was also involved in the drafting of the Solemn League and Covenant in 1643.

In 1643 he succeeded Sir Alexander Clerk of Pittencrieff as Lord Provost of Edinburgh. The time of this is critical as it immediately precedes Scotland's involvement in the English Civil War and is said to have been a tactical election. In his capacity as Provost, in 1645, with his brother-in-law Sir William Gray, he met the captain of an Algerian ship who had an armed ship placed within Leith Roads. The pirate demanded the provost's son as a hostage, but Smith had only a daughter, and furthermore that daughter was stricken with the plague which swept Edinburgh in that year. Gray's daughter Egidia, had died of the plague earlier that year. However, the "Moor" offered to cure Smith's daughter: if he failed he would leave; if he succeeded a ransom should be paid. Smith took some days to decide, while the "moor" lodged in a house at the head of the Canongate. However, the physician who appeared was not the moor, but Andrew Gray son of Master Gray of Kinfauns, who had for many years been serving the Emperor of Morocco where his sister was one of the emperor's wives. Andrew Gray had fled Edinburgh at the time of rioting due to the coronation of King Charles I, and had been living in exile. The story tells that he saved her life and then married her. Gray and his wife settled on the Canongate in the building now known as Morocco Land.

He was succeeded as Provost by Sir Archibald Tod. His most important task in this period was representing the city of Edinburgh during the creation of the Solemn League and Covenant in 1643: the document which gives name to the Covenanters. Although beyond his term of office he also appears on the Treaty of 1650 (with Charles II) presumably due to ongoing negotiation in its terms.

In 1651 he took over from James Steuart of Coltness as Collector General of Excise (together with John Wauchope) a highly unpopular role during these periods of high taxation. In 1676 John Inglis of Cramond purchased Kings Cramond from the "creditors of John Smith of Grothill" implying Smith was deceased and his estate was broken.

Grothill (Grotil) House is first shown in a map in John Adair's 1682 map of central Scotland. It stood south-east of Drylaw House.

The original Kings Cramond House stood on what is now Barton Avenue West. It was demolished around 1800 and replaced by a huge mansion by Robert Adam known as Barton House and owned by the Ramsays of Barnton, a banking family. The second mansion was demolished in 1920 and redeveloped as large villas.

Groathill House was demolished in 1925 to create Telford Road, the main link between Ferry Road and Queensferry Road.

== Family ==
His sister Egidia Smith (a.k.a. Geida or Geils), married Sir William Gray of Pittendrum, an Edinburgh merchant and son of Andrew Gray, 7th Lord Gray. Their six sons and twelve daughters including Andrew Gray. Their daughter Agnes married John Dundas of Dundas Castle and Newliston. Following the death of John Dundas she married Archibald Primrose, Lord Rosebery. Her daughter Elizabeth married John, Earl of Stair.

Another sister, Agnes Smith was second wife to John Byres of Coates, Treasurer of the Council while he was Provost.

John Smith married Jonet Eleis. His sons Robert Smith of Southfield (born 1631), and John Smith younger inherited his properties. The estate was broken and sold from 1676, John Smith sold Grothill in 1683.
