= Imperial gazetteer =

Imperial Gazetteer may refer to the following reference works on parts of the colonial age British Empire :

- The Imperial Gazetteer of India
  - and the parallel publications known as the Imperial Gazetteer of India: Provincial Series
- The Imperial Gazetteer of Scotland
- The Imperial Gazetteer of England and Wales
