= George Godfrey Cunningham =

Scottish writer, compiler, and translator (1802–1860)

George Godfrey Cunningham (c. 1802 – 23 September 1860) was a Scottish writer, compiler, and translator.

== Biography ==
After publishing a poem ("A Choice") in Alexander Whitelaw's The Casquet of Literary Gems (1828), Cunningham's first full work was Foreign Tales and Traditions (1829), published by Blackie, Fullarton & Company. It was a collection of translations of several European stories, mostly German Romanticist literature, which was popular in Britain in the 1820s. This included five stories from Grimms' Fairy Tales, that were heavily based on the earlier translations by Edgar Taylor and David Jardine. His Lives of Eminent and Illustrious Englishmen (1834–1837) aimed to teach English history through biographies of its leading figures. It was patronised by royalty and Henry Brougham, and though it initially won praise, the biographies of its later volumes were less well connected, and began to rely heavily on extracts from the subjects' memoirs.

By 1838, Cunningham was living in Glasgow. On 2 August 1843, he married Isabella Crawford Laurie (1812–1903) in St Cuthbert's Church, Edinburgh. On 18 March 1845, their only son, also named George Godfrey Cunningham (1845–1904), was born. Around 1846, they moved from Glasgow to Redcol (also spelled Redcoll or Redcoal) in Gladsmuir parish, East Lothian, where Cunningham was one of twenty-seven landowners in that parish eligible to vote for their member of parliament. They continued to live at Redcol until at least 1852, but by 1855 had moved to Hillside Crescent in Edinburgh, before finally moving to Windermere in Cumbria by 1859.

He was a shareholder of the Bank of London, partner of the publishing firm Fullarton & Co., and a member of the Camden Society, Percy Society, Royal Geographical Society, and Granger Society. In 1854, he chaired a meeting of the shareholders of the Caledonian Railway and Edinburgh and Glasgow Railway, to get the two companies to stop lowering their fares in a price war which was negatively affecting the value of both companies.

His Gazetteer of the World (1850–1856) was considered his greatest and principal work, and he was in the process of preparing an improved edition of it at the time of his death. In addition to his main works, he wrote short biographies of his friend Reverend John Morell Mckenzie, Church of Scotland minister John Brown Patterson, and seventeenth century Church of England cleric Jeremy Taylor.

Cunningham died on 23 September 1860 at Elleray Bank, Windermere.

== Bibliography ==
- Foreign Tales and Traditions (1829) 2 volumes
  - Tales from the German (1854) second edition of first volume
  - German Stories (1855) second edition of second volume
- Lives of Eminent and Illustrious Englishmen from Alfred the Great to the Latest Times (1834–1837) 8 volumes
  - A History of England in the Lives of Englishmen (1849–1852) 8 volumes (revised edition)
  - The English Nation; or, A History of England in the Lives of Englishmen (1863–1868) 8 volumes (revised edition)
- Parliamentary Gazetteer of Scotland (1848–1851) 2 volumes
- Gazetteer of the World (1850–1856) 7 volumes
- James Bell's A System of Geography (editor of later editions)
