= Thomas Constable (printer and publisher) =

Scottish printer and publisher (1812 – 1881)

- Born: 29 June 1812; Craigcrook, Scotland
- Died: 26 May 1881 (aged 68); Marston Bigot, Somerset, England
- Occupations: Publisher, printer, bookseller
- Writing career
- Notable works: Archibald Constable and his Literary Correspondents

Thomas Constable FRSE (29 June 1812 – 26 May 1881) was a Scottish printer and publisher.

== Early life and career ==
Thomas Constable was born on 29 June 1812 in Craigcrook Castle, west of Edinburgh. He was the fourth son of the Scottish publisher, bookseller and stationer Archibald David Constable (1774–1827) and Mary, daughter of David Willison.

In his youth he studied printing under the tutelage of Mr. Charles Richards of St. Martin's Lane, London and then returned to Edinburgh to establish his own printing business. Following the death of his father Archibald in 1827, Thomas took over his father's printing, publishing and bookselling business in 1833 and moved the business to 11 Thistle Street, New Town, Edinburgh. In conformity with his late father's wishes, Thomas continued the publishing programme that was already under way, issuing new books on "practical" topics such as history, geography, engineering and travel accounts, and issuing new volumes in his father's Constable's Miscellany book series. Thomas also continued and expanded the Edinburgh printing business of his grandfather, David Willison (father-in-law of Archibald Constable).

In 1835 he became the His Majesty's Printer and Publisher in Edinburgh (which gave him the privilege of Acts of Parliaments, Edicts, Proclamations, and other papers" but did not give him a monopoly of printing the Bible in Scotland as had formerly been the case) and four years later he was appointed Printer to the University of Edinburgh.

In the 1830s he printed small circulars, legal works and work for learned societies. He also printed books for the publishers Robert Caddell and Adam and Charles Black.

Beginning in the early 1840s Thomas Constable began printing periodicals and magazines for various markets. Those included the Edinburgh Ladies Magazine, the Children's Missionary Record, the British Mothers' Magazine, the Bulwark, or Reformist Journal, and reports from the Free Church of Scotland's Women's Home Missionary Society. He also printed the Northern British Review and the Scottish Jurist.

== Thomas Constable & Company ==
In the late 1840s he began publishing under the aegis of Thomas Constable & Company.

In 1847 he purchased the copyright of all the works of the Scottish churchman Dr Thomas Chalmers (1780-1847). Many of those works were published over the following years along with the Memoirs of the Life and Writings of Thomas Chalmers by William Hanna. The rights for those works had cost Constable £10,000 which he failed to recoup by publishing them but that did not deter Constable from undertaking further publishing projects.

In 1854 he began publishing the complete works (in eleven volumes and edited by Sir William Hamilton; 1854-1877) of the Scottish philosopher and mathematician Dugald Stewart. In the same year Constable launched the popular school series known as Constable's Educational Series (which featured such books as J. D. Morell's A Grammar of the English Language Together with an Exposition of the Analysis of Sentences, James Clyde's Elementary Geography and James Currie's The Elements of Musical Analysis).

Also in 1854 he launched the series known as Constable's Miscellany of Foreign Literature.

Some of the other notable works published by Thomas Constable included the Letters of Calvin Compiled from the Original Manuscripts and Edited with Historical Notes (1855), Giovanni Ruffini's novels such as Lorenzo Benoni Or Passages in the Life of an Italian (1853), The Paragreens on a Visit to the Paris Universal Exhibition (1856) and Doctor Antonio: A Tale (1858), and the earlier works of John Brown, M.D., such as Rab and his Friends (1859).

In 1853 much of Thomas Constable's printing work consisted of Bible printing. In that year he also extended his printing clientele: rather than just printing for the local Scottish market, he entered the London market and began to print books for London publishers.

== T. & A. Constable Ltd ==

Thomas Constable continued publishing until 1860, at which point he sold the publishing part of his business to Edmonston & Douglas. He continued the printing activities of his firm. In 1861 he was employing 50 compositors for his printing work, a greater number than any other Edinburgh firm at that date. In 1865 his son Archibald joined the firm as a partner and the firm began publishing as T. & A. Constable Ltd.

=== Publications ===
- Fraser, William (1869). The Chiefs of Colquhoun and Their Country. Edinburgh: T. and A. Constable.
- Fraser, James (1905) [Edited from original manuscript (c.1674) with notes and introduction, by William Mackay]. Chronicles of the Frasers: the Wardlaw manuscript entitled 'Polichronicon seu policratica temporum, or, The true genealogy of the Frasers', 916–1674. Inverness: Printed at the University Press by T. and A. Constable for the Scottish History Society.
- MacPhail, James Robertson Nicolson (1914). Highland Papers. Vol. 1. Edinburgh: T. and A. Constable for the Scottish History Society.
- MacPhail, James Robertson Nicolson (1914). Highland Papers. Vol. 2. Edinburgh: T. and A. Constable for the Scottish History Society.
- Blaikie, Walter Biggar (1916). Origins of the 'forty-five : and other papers relating to that rising. Edinburgh: Printed at the University press by T. and A. Constable for the Scottish History Society.

== Later years ==
In the 1870s Thomas Constable devoted himself to writing. His major work was a biography of his father Archibald Constable and his Literary Correspondents (1873). He also penned some private memoirs, including Memoir of Lewis D. B. Gordon, F.R.S.E., Professor of Civil Engineering and Mechanics in the University of Glasgow (1877) and Memoir of the Rev. Charles A. Chastel de Boinville (1880).

== Honours ==
In 1866 he became a Fellow of the Royal Society of Edinburgh.

== Personal life and death ==
On 14 October 1837 Constable married Lucia Anna Cowan, the daughter of Alexander Cowan, a papermaker in Valleyfield, Penicuik. Their children included Archibald David Constable (1843–1915), who had been named after his grandfather.

He died on 26 May 1881 at "Marston Biggot Rectory, the residence of his brother, the Rev. John Constable".

== Freemasonry ==
Constable was a Scottish Freemason. He was Initiated in Lodge Canongate Kilwinning, No. 2, on 13 March 1835.

== Assessment ==
The book history academic Alexis Weedon has described Thomas Constable's career "modest". However, Constable maintained a publishing programme and printing over many years and improved efficiency by modernising the working practices and acquiring new fonts (adding "Arabic, Hebrew, Coptic, Sanskrit, German, and Music" fonts to the "fount of Greek" originally owned in 1835) and presses (adding sixteen presses and a cylinder and three platen machines" to the four presses owned in 1835).

It was also partly as a result of Thomas taking over the firm of his father Archibald Constable in 1833 after the bankruptcy of the previous decade that the Constable publishing firm would survive into the twentieth century as a major publisher of fiction and non-fiction books. The Constable name continues today under the imprint name of Constable and Robinson.

== See also ==
- George Washington Bacon
- Archibald Fullarton
