= Craigcrook Castle =

Castle in Edinburgh, Scotland

- Edinburgh, Scotland
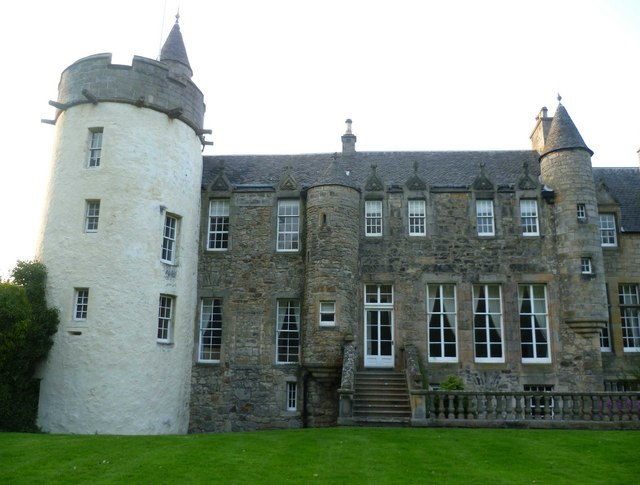

Location
- Coordinates: 55.9549515°N 3.2656914°W

Site history
- Built: 17th century
- Materials: Masonry

Listed Building – Category B
- Official name: Craigcrook Castle Craigcrook Road
- Designated: 14 July 1966; 60 years ago
- Reference no.: LB28014

Craigcrook Castle is a 6,701 square feet (622.5 m^{2}) castle giving its name to the Craigcrook district of Edinburgh, about 3 miles (4.8 km) west of the centre of Edinburgh, Scotland. The castle is primarily of the 17th century, though with later additions. In the 19th century, it was the home of Francis Jeffrey, Lord Jeffrey, and became known for its literary gatherings. It is a category B listed building.

== History ==
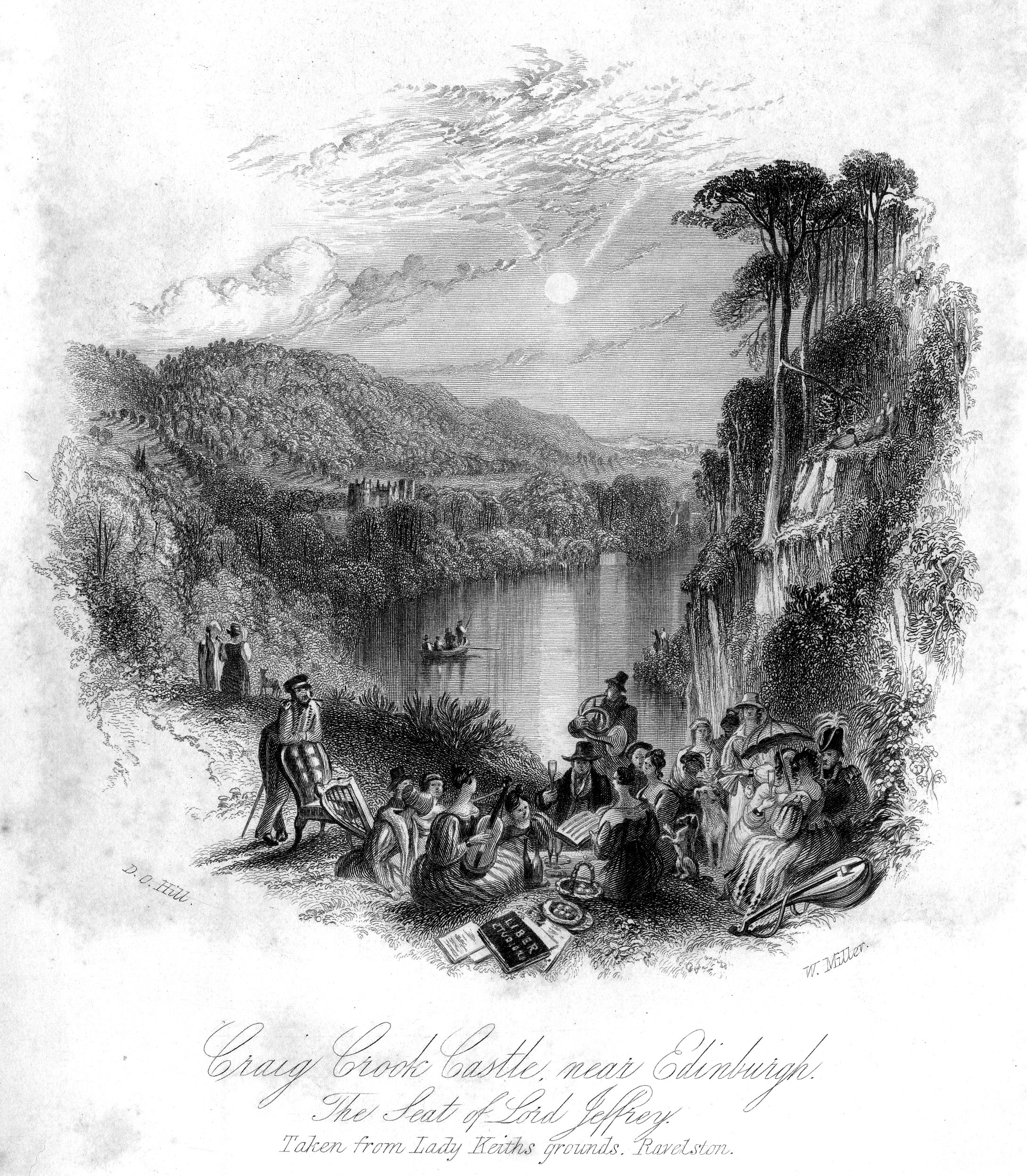
Craigcrook Castle in the 1830s

The lands of Craigcrook were, in the 14th century, in the possession of the Graham family. In 1362 the lands were given to the chaplains of St Giles' Cathedral. They passed through several more owners before 1542, when William Adamson, a merchant and burgess of Edinburgh, took possession. Adamson owned large estates in what is now north-western Edinburgh, including Craigleith, Groathill and Clermiston. Adamson was killed at the Battle of Pinkie on 10 September 1547. The Adamson family constructed, or reconstructed, Craigcrook Castle, and owned it until 1659, when it was sold to John Mein, a merchant in Edinburgh. Ten years later it became the home of Sir John Hall of Dunglass, who later was the Lord Provost of Edinburgh in 1689. Hall sold the property in 1682 to Walter Pringle, advocate, who in turn sold it, in 1689, to John Strachan, Writer to the Signet. On Strachan's death in 1719, his property, including Craigcrook Castle, was left for charitable purposes. The charitable Craigcrook Mortification, which was set up on the death of John Strachan, retains ownership of the castle and grounds.

In 1707 Strachan's servant, Helen Bell, was murdered beneath the Castle Rock in Edinburgh, en route to Craigcrook and the murderers used her key to enter Strachan's Edinburgh townhouse, where they stole £900 in silver coin and £100 in gold coin. Only one of the two men was punished for the crime: William Thomson being hanged in the Grassmarket for his crimes.

It is not known when the castle itself was constructed. From the style of building, the majority of the castle has been dated to the early 17th century. However, the nature of the vaulting inside suggests that the core of an earlier fortalice was extensively rebuilt or extended at this time.

Archibald Constable, the publisher, occupied it until 1815 and his son Thomas Constable was born here in 1812. It then became the home of the lawyer and literary critic Francis Jeffrey, Lord Jeffrey (1773–1850). Soon after he took on the tenancy, Jeffrey added a drawing room wing to the north, and in 1818 commissioned David Roberts to decorate the library. In 1835 he commissioned William Playfair to remodel the main building and rebuild the east. During the tenancies of Constable and Jeffrey Sir Walter Scott visited the castle frequently. Henry Cockburn, Lord Cockburn was also a frequent guest over a period of 34 years.

The castle is said to be haunted by Lord Jeffrey.

Another 19th-century tenant was the writer and politician William Stirling who, in 1855, offered the use of the grounds to the English poet Gerald Massey, then in Edinburgh as an editor at the Edinburgh News. Massey subsequently wrote the poem Craigcrook Castle, considered to be one of his most accomplished poems in blank verse.

The tenant after Jeffrey's death was John Hunter Watt. Craigcrook Castle was known during the 19th century for its literary soirées; among the guests were Charles Dickens, Hans Christian Andersen, George Eliot and Lord Tennyson.

A billiard room was added to the east by Robert Croall in about 1891, the architect being Thomas Leadbetter. Another extension was added, after the property became the base for an architectural practice, in 1968. The castle was listed category A on 14 July 1966 but only received statutory protection on 14 December 1970.

Craigcrook was the Scottish headquarters of Marine Harvest Ltd, a multinational fish-farming company, between 1986 and 2004. Benjamin Tindall Architects restored the interior in 1989.

== Description ==
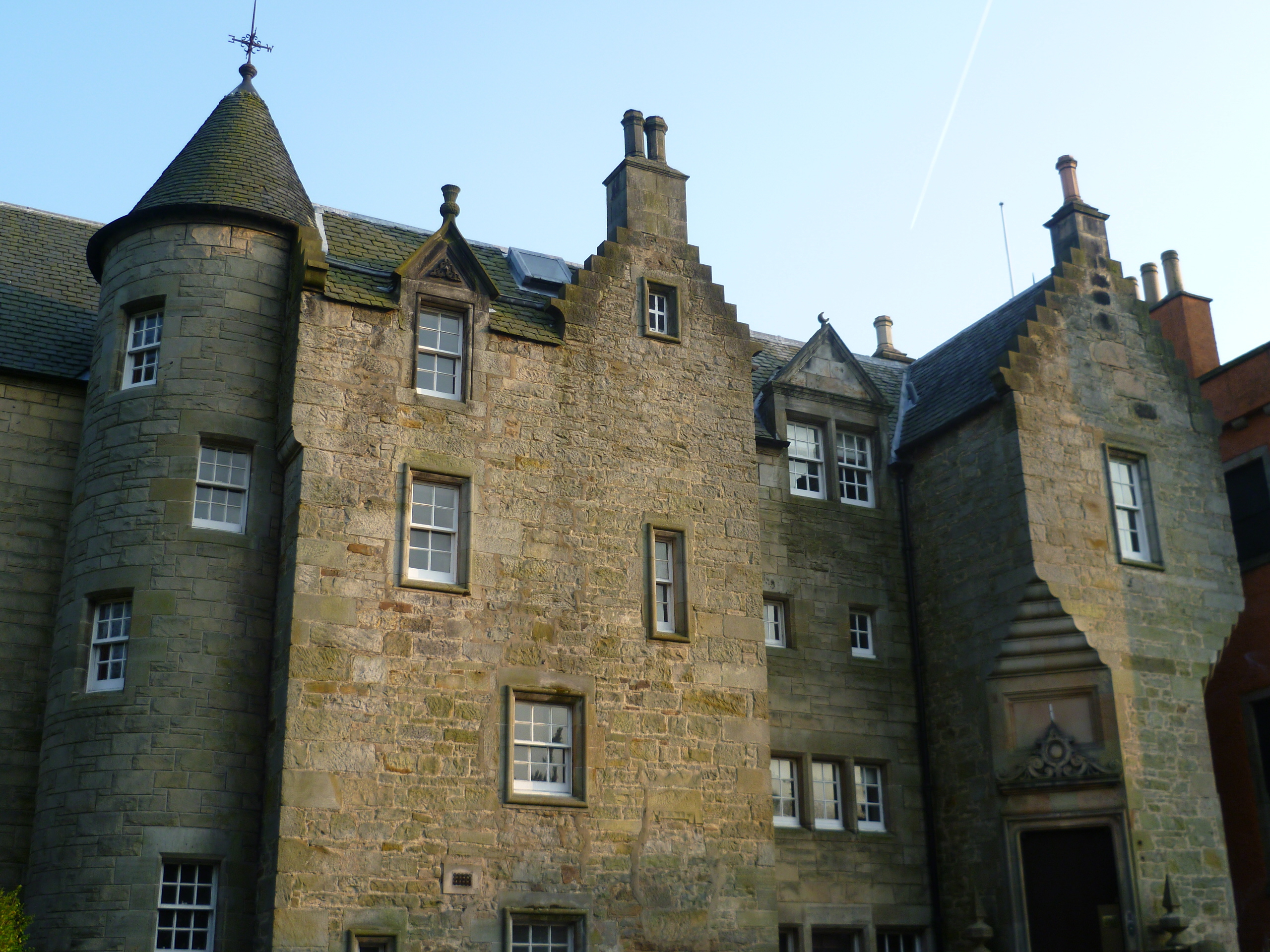
Craicrook Castle 2011

The castle is close to Corstorphine Hill, and was a fine country house convenient for the city. The history of the Parish of Cramond says, "To the S.W. of Drylaw, in a hollow at the foot of Corstorphine Hill, which here makes a turn or crook to the eastward, whence the name is derived, stands Craigcrook, apparently the most ancient edifice in the parish".

It originated as a Z-plan tower house, but has had numerous additions, with the result that both within and without there is a jumble of styles. There is a round tower on the south-west corner, and a square tower to the north-east.

The main block is about 60 by 20 feet (18.3 by 6.1 m), and three storeys high. The ground floor was formerly vaulted. as is the upper floor of the round tower. The round tower is 20 feet (6.1 m) in diameter. The square tower's sides are 17 feet (5.2 m) long, with the stairs at the south-east angle. There is an entrance tower, built by Playfair. The castle has crow-stepped gables and pediment dormer windows. Some of the 19th-century interior work is of interest, including murals by David Roberts.

A 17th-century wall still encloses the garden which has a roll-moulded arched gateway, the pediment of which is dated 1626.

== Modern day ==
The Castle went up for sale with Ballantynes in 2014, but failed to sell. It is now being turned into a care home by Lorn Macneal Architects.
