= John Byres of Coates =

Scottish banker and merchant

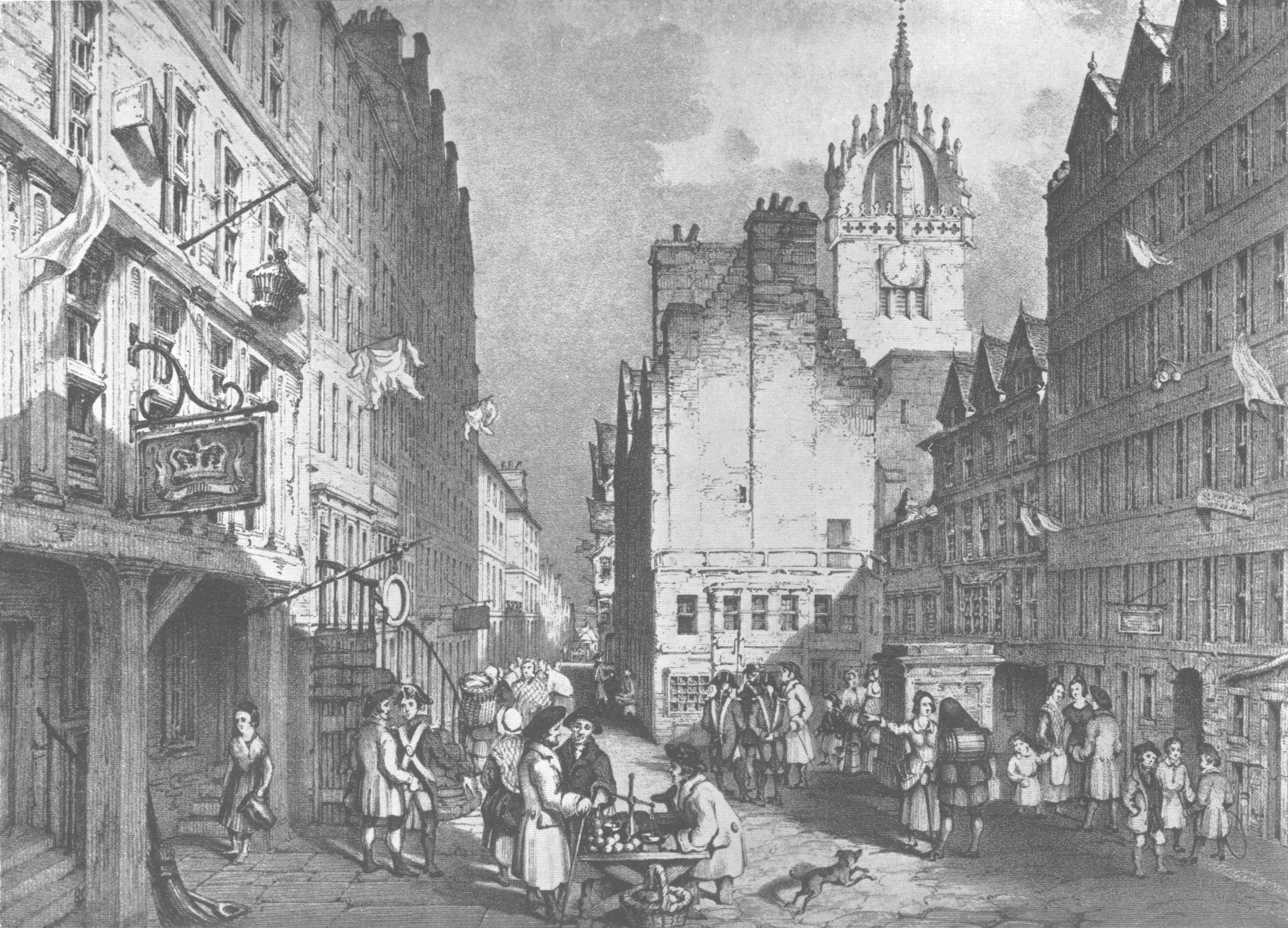
Byer's tenement and bank (left) facing onto the Tolbooth Prison and St Giles

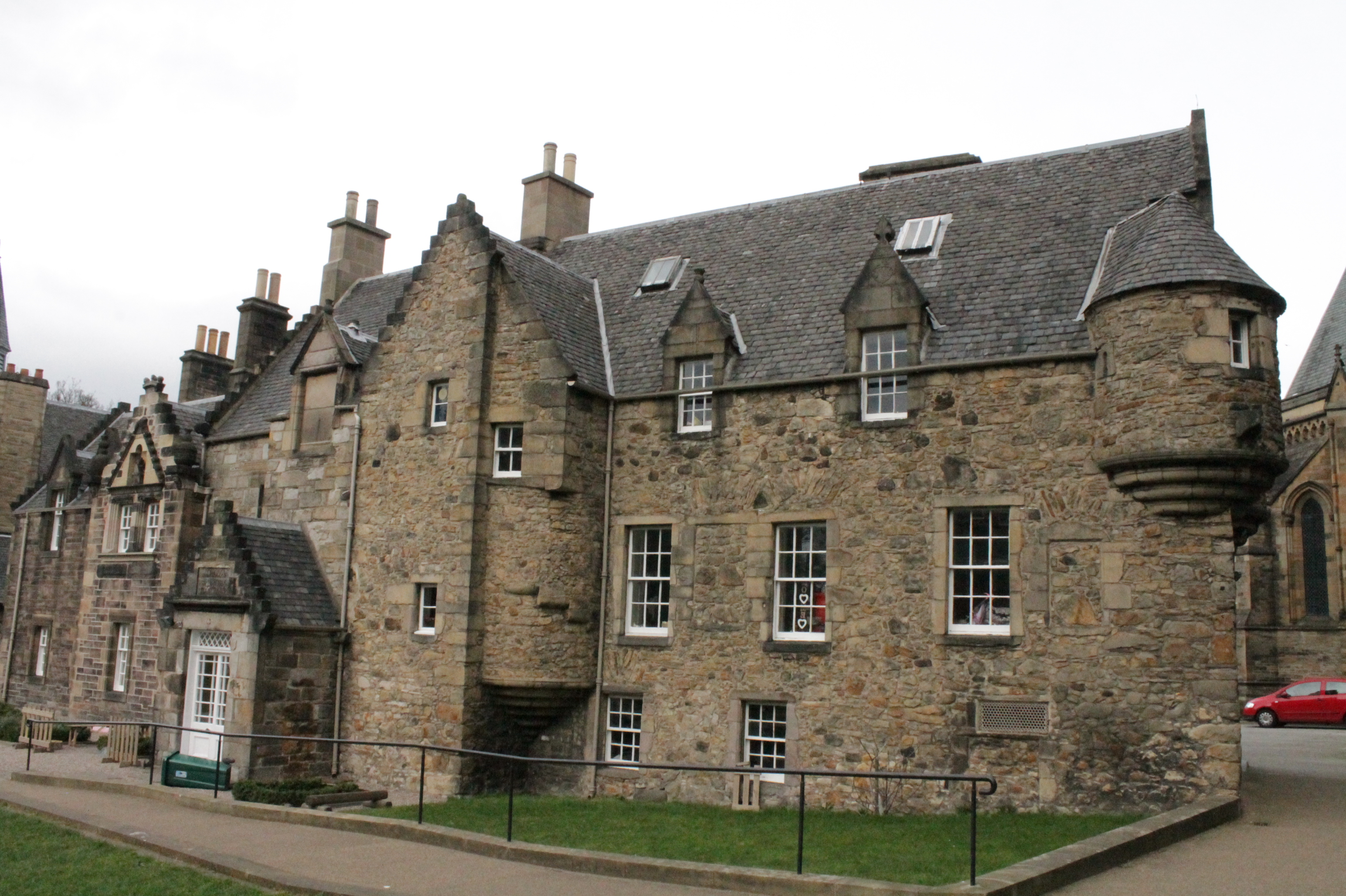
Coates House, Edinburgh

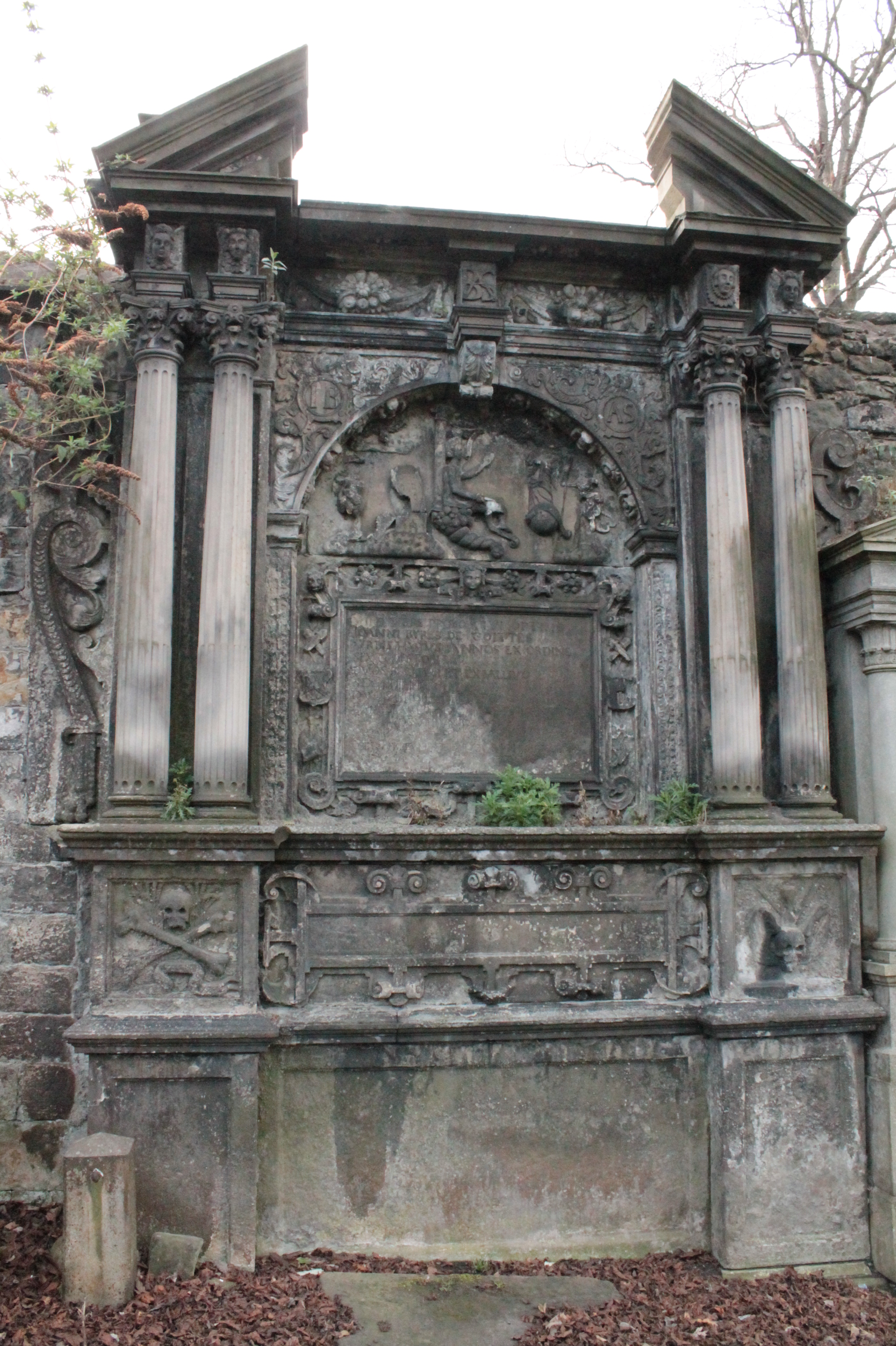
The grave of John Byres of Coates, Greyfriars Kirkyard

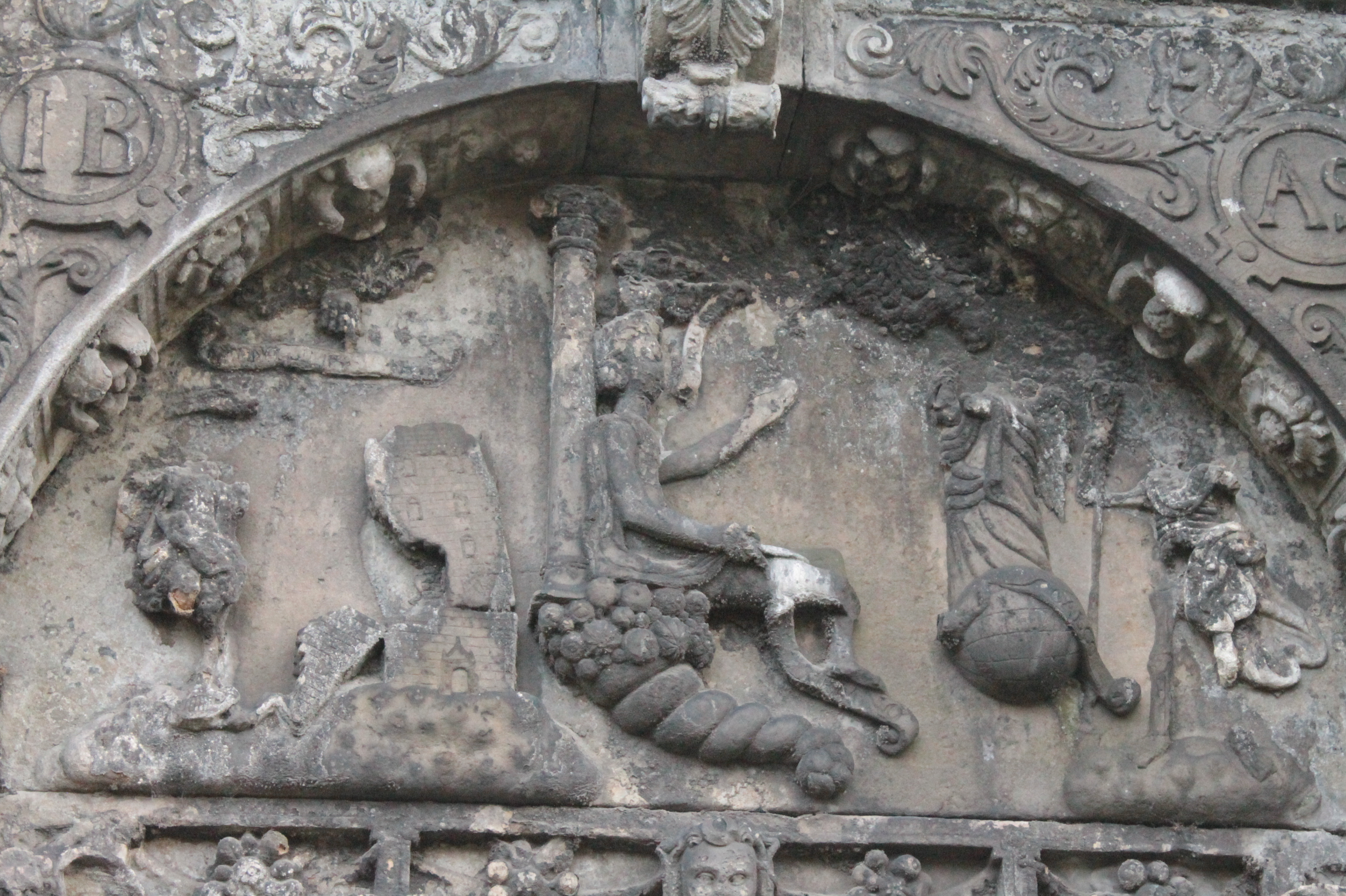
Symbolic carvings on the tomb of John Byres of Coates, Greyfriars Kirkyard

Sir John Byres of Coates (1569–1629) was a 16th/17th century Scottish banker and merchant who served as Treasurer and Old Provost for Edinburgh Town Council. Old Provost is the equivalent of Deputy Provost.

Byers Close on the Royal Mile is named after him.

== Life ==
He was born in Edinburgh in 1569. His background is unclear but he appears to have been from a wealthy family of merchants and bankers.

In the late 16th century he bought tenements (from Gilbert Lauder) on the Royal Mile north of St Giles Cathedral close to the Old Tolbooth and the Luckenbooths. Here he rented out the flats and ground floor shops and presumably ran his own bank (probably 369 High Street).

He was Treasurer of Edinburgh Town Council 1612 to 1615. He also served as Depute Provost (at that time confusingly termed "Old Provost").

In 1615 he built Coates Hall, later called Easter Coates, then west of the city (now lying between Palmerston Place and Manor Place). The building contains carved stone lintels brought from his house on Byers Close, plus a marriage lintel bearing his initials JB (written as IB in old script) and MB for his wife.

He served as Dean of Guild 1619 to 1624.

He died on 24 November 1629. He is buried in Greyfriars Kirkyard. His monument stands on the western wall of the original churchyard, on the lower north section close to the half-sunken vault of John Baptist Medina. The magnificent monument was created by William Wallace.

His Royal Mile tenements were acquired by William Dick of Braid after Byres' death.

== Family ==
He first married Margaret Barclay of Towie. They had one child, a daughter, Rachel Byres. Two other daughters died in infancy. Rachel married Thomas Sydserff.

Margaret died in 1616 and in 1617 he secondly married Agnes Smith sister of John Smith of Grothill (a future Provost of the city). They had six sons and one daughter including his heir: Sir John Byres of Coates and Warriston, 2nd Baronet (1619-1648).

== Trivia ==
Coates Hall was bought by William Walker around 1800. His spinster daughters, Mary and Barbara Walker, gifted both the garden of their home and huge funds to the Episcopal Church of Scotland in 1873 for the building of St Mary's Cathedral.

In 1887 (following the death of the sisters) Coates Hall (Easter Coates) became the Cathedral Choir School serving the then newly built St Mary's Episcopal Cathedral being remodelled by George Gilbert Scott and John Oldrid Scott, architects for the cathedral next door (which now dwarfs Coates Hall).

It is noteworthy that the Walker sisters chose to be buried next to John Byres in Greyfriars Kirkyard.
