= G. H. Swanston =

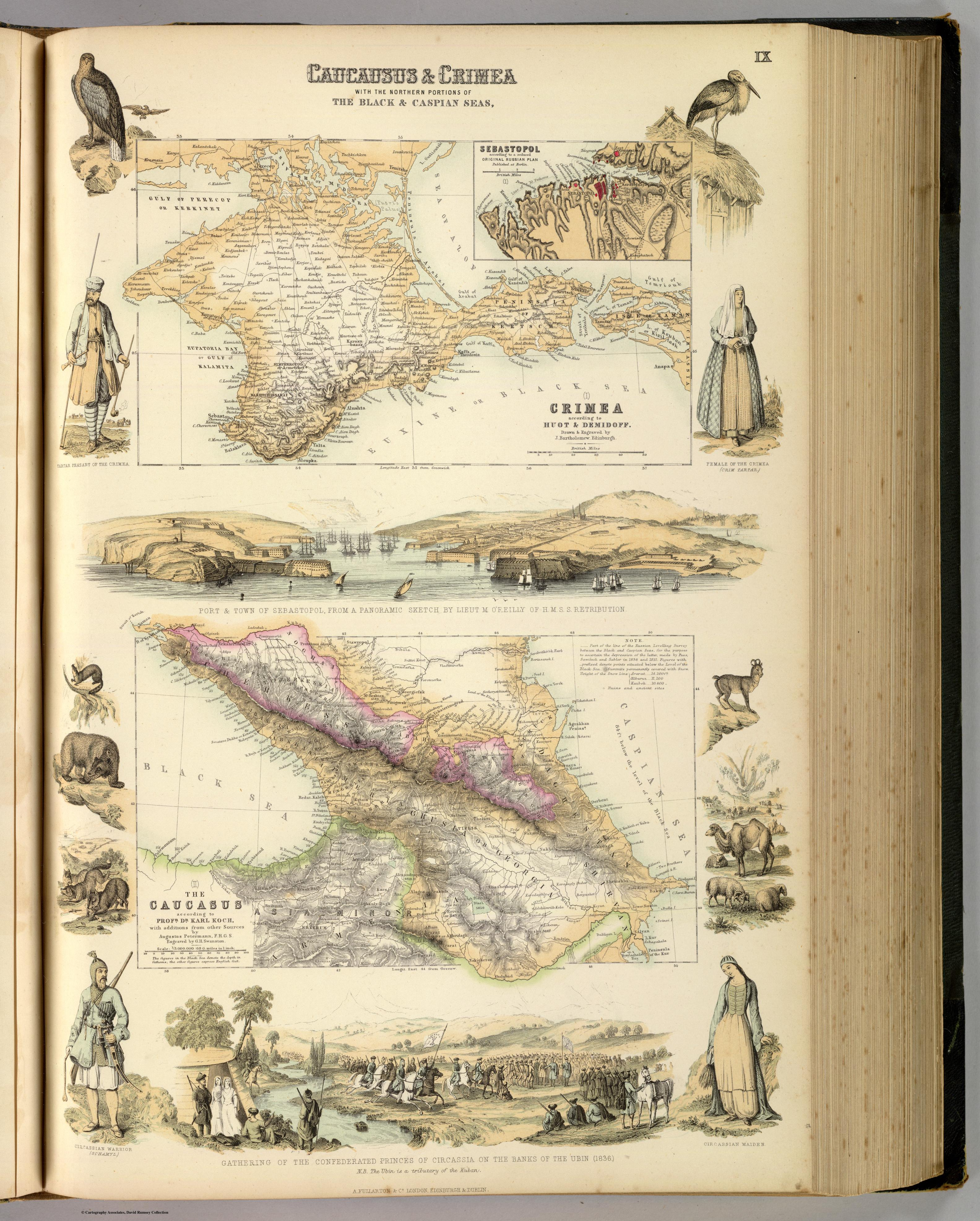
Engraving from the Royal Illustrated Atlas

George Heriot Swanston (7 May 1814 in Edinburgh – ?) was a Scottish map engraver, particularly noted for his engravings and vignettes illustrating Archibald Fullarton & Co's Royal Illustrated Atlas in the 1860s. He often collaborated with another Scot, the cartographer John Bartholomew. George Heriot was the son of George Swanston who had married Margaret Heriot on 2 November 1807 at Canongate in Edinburgh.
