= George Washington Bacon =

American mapmaker and publisher (1830–1922)

George Washington Bacon (1830–1922) was an American mapmaker and publisher who developed a successful business producing maps of London.

In 1861, Bacon founded a series of businesses. He became bankrupt in 1867, after failing to keep on top of managing these businesses.

In 1870, Bacon started his business, G.W. Bacon & Co., on 127 Strand, London. He based his atlases on the plates used by Edward Weller for his Weekly Dispatch Atlas. In 1893, he bought the map business of James Wyld.

During this time period, G.W Bacon created illustrations of British colonial wars, with their most famous publication being Bacon's South Africa War Prints in 1901, covering the Second Boer War.

Around 1900, G.W. Bacon was purchased by the Scottish publishing house of W.& A.K. Johnston and incorporated into their own. Maps using the Bacon brand were being produced as late as 1956. About 1967 their name was changed to Johnston & Bacon.

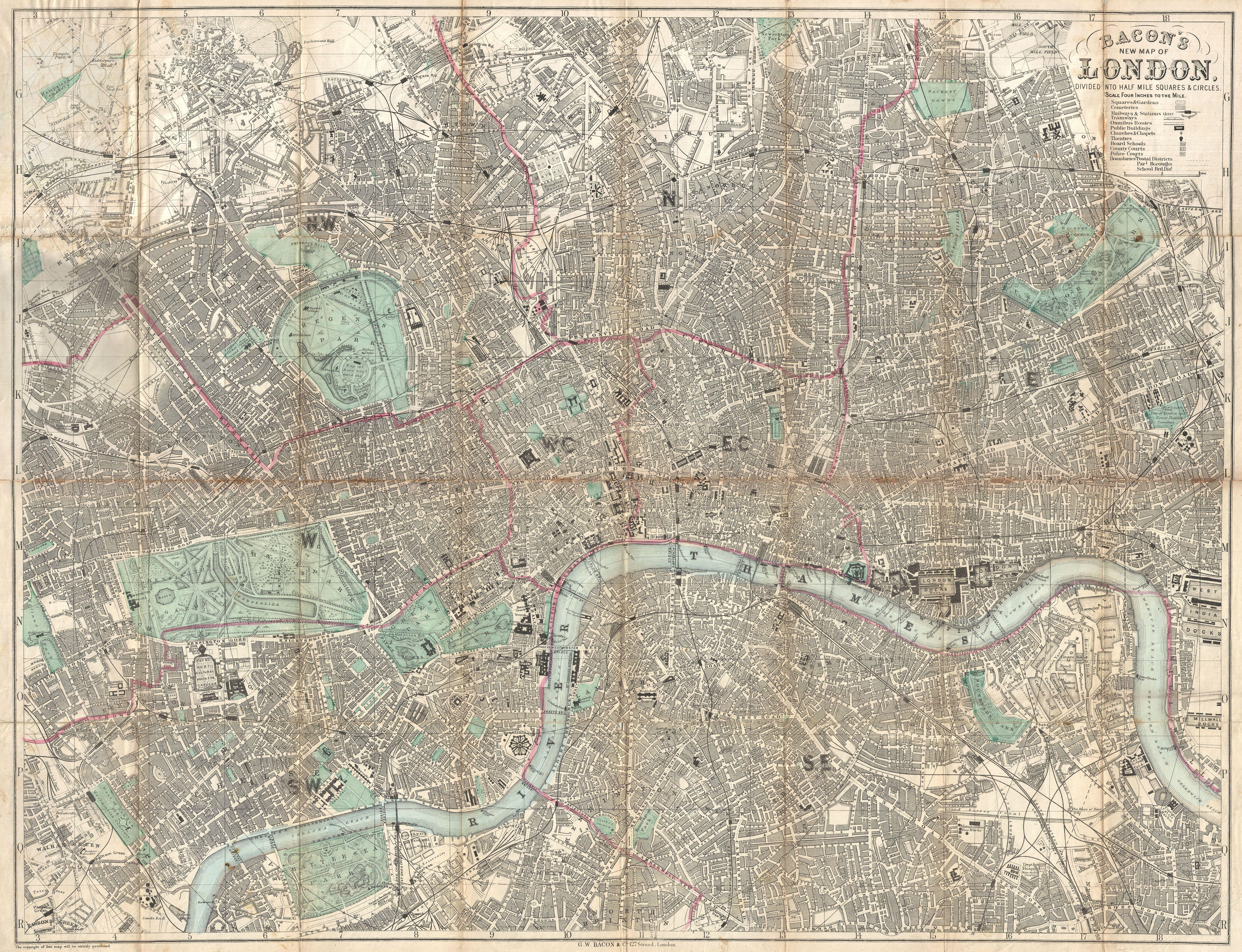
Bacon's New Map of London, c. 1890.

== Selected publications ==
- The New Ordnance Atlas of the British Isles.
- Groves, John Percy (1893). History of the 42nd Royal Highlanders - "The Black watch" now the first battalion "The Black Watch" (Royal Highlanders) 1729–1893. Illustrated by Harry Payne. Edinburgh: W. & A.K. Johnston.
- Johnston, Thomas Brumby; Robertson, James Alexander; Dickson, William Kirk (1899). Historical Geography of the Clans of Scotland. Edinburgh and London: W. & A.K. Johnston.
- The Scottish clans and Their Tartans : with notes (Library ed.). Edinburgh: W. & A.K. Johnston. 1900.
- Johnston, George Harvey (1901). The Ruddimans in Scotland, Their History and Works. Edinburgh: W. and A.K. Johnston.
- Johnston, George Harvey (1905). The Heraldry of the Johnstons, with notes on all the males of the family, descriptions of the arms, plates and pedigrees. Edinburgh: W. and A.K. Johnston.
- Johnston, George Harvey (1906). The Heraldry of the Stewarts, with notes on all the males of the family, descriptions of the arms, plates and pedigrees. Edinburgh: W. and A.K. Johnston.
- Johnston, George Harvey (1907). The Heraldry of the Douglases, with notes on all the males of the family, descriptions of the arms, plates and pedigrees. Edinburgh: W. and A.K. Johnston.
- Adam, Frank (1908). The Clans, Septs, and Regiments of the Scottish Highlands. Edinburgh and London: W. & A.K. Johnston. ISBN 9780717945009.
- Johnston, George Harvey (1909). The Heraldry of the Hamiltons, with notes on all the males of the family, descriptions of the arms, plates and pedigrees. Edinburgh: W. and A.K. Johnston.
- Johnston, George Harvey (1910). The Heraldry of the Murrays, with notes on all the males of the family, descriptions of the arms, plates and pedigrees. Edinburgh: W. & A.K. Johnston.
- Johnston, George Harvey (1920). The Heraldry of the Campbells, with notes on all the males of the family, descriptions of the arms, plates and pedigrees. Vol. 1. Edinburgh: W. and A.K. Johnston.
- Johnston, George Harvey (1920). The Heraldry of the Campbells, with notes on all the males of the family, descriptions of the arms, plates and pedigrees. Vol. 2. Edinburgh: W. and A.K. Johnston.
- Fraser, C.I of Reelig (1954). The Clan Munro. Stirling: Johnston & Bacon. ISBN 0-7179-4535-9.
- Mackinnon, Donald (1957). The Clan Ross. Edinburgh: W. & A. K. Johnston & G. W. Bacon. ISBN 978-0-7179-4537-5.

== See also ==
- Archibald Constable
- Thomas Constable (printer and publisher)
- Archibald Fullarton
- Bacon's South Africa War Prints
