= Archibald Constable =

Scottish publisher, bookseller and stationer (1774 – 1827)

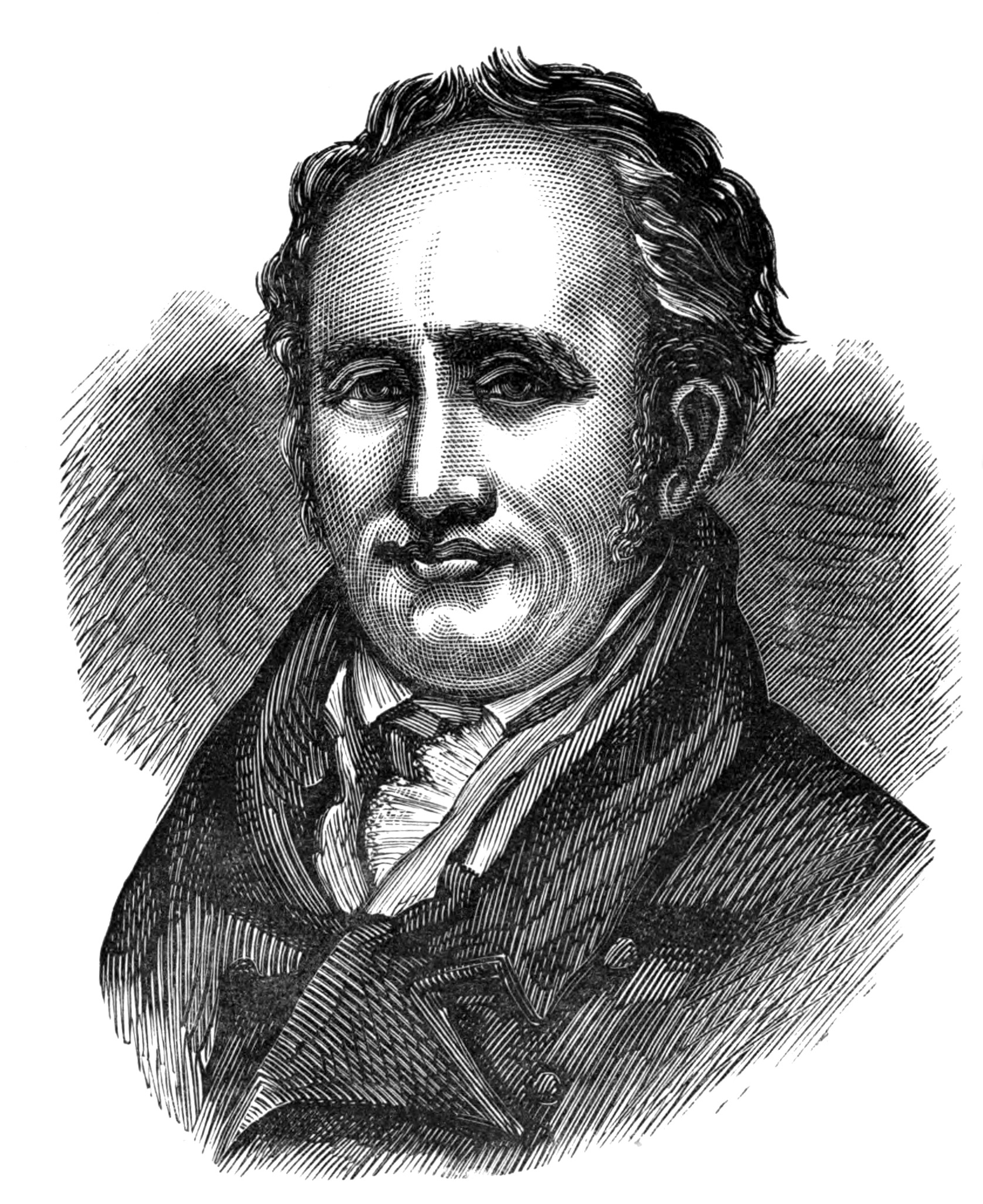
- Lithograph of Archibald Constable published in A History of Booksellers, the Old and the New
- Born: Archibald David Constable; February 24, 1774; Carnbee, Fife, Scotland
- Died: July 21, 1827 (aged 53); Edinburgh, Scotland
- Resting place: Old Calton Burial Ground, Edinburgh
- Occupations: Publisher, bookseller, stationer
- Known for: Founder of Archibald Constable & Co., publisher of Edinburgh Review, early publisher of Sir Walter Scott

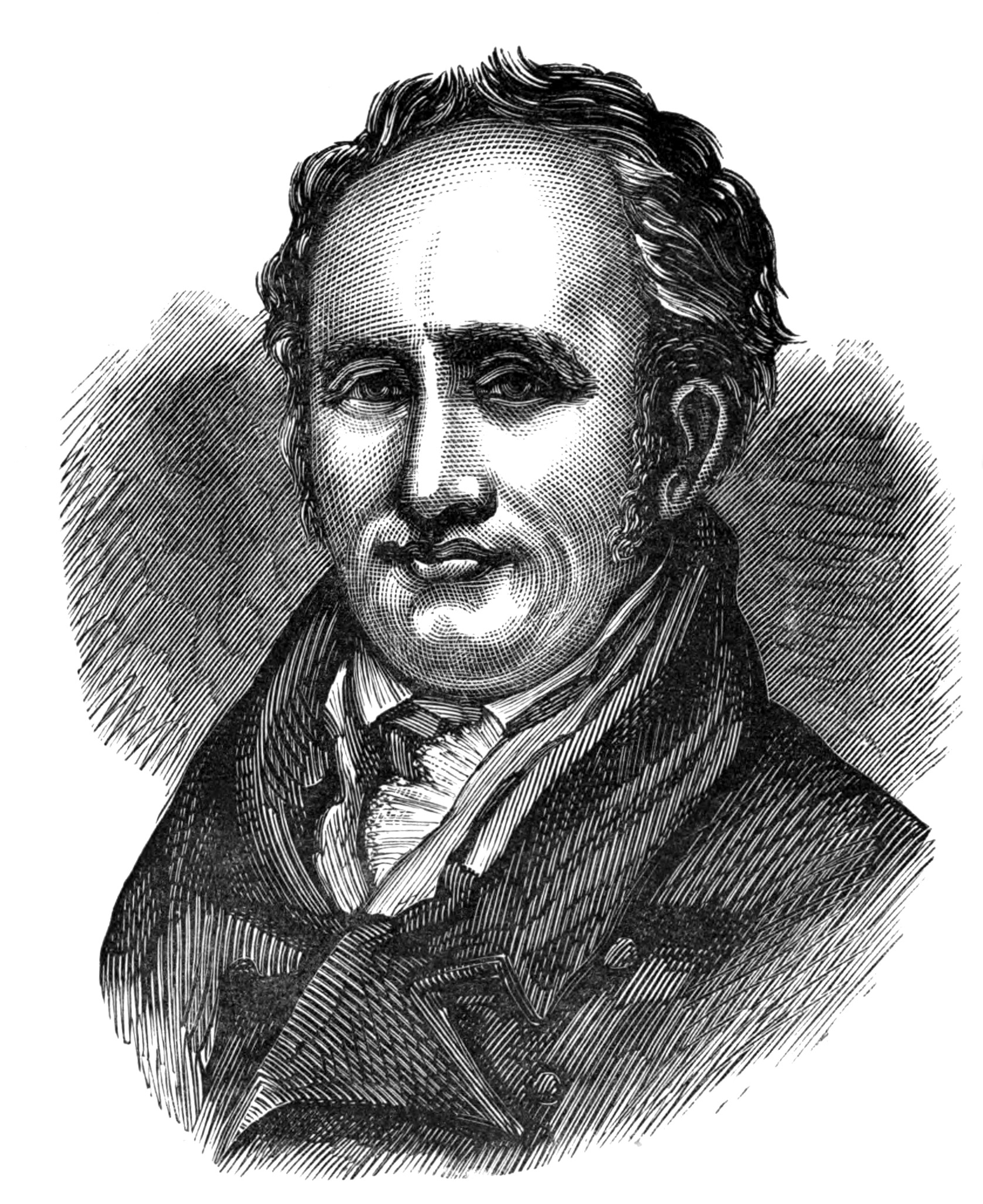
Lithograph of Archibald Constable published in A History of Booksellers, the Old and the New.

Archibald David Constable (24 February 1774 – 21 July 1827) was a Scottish publisher, bookseller and stationer.

== Life ==
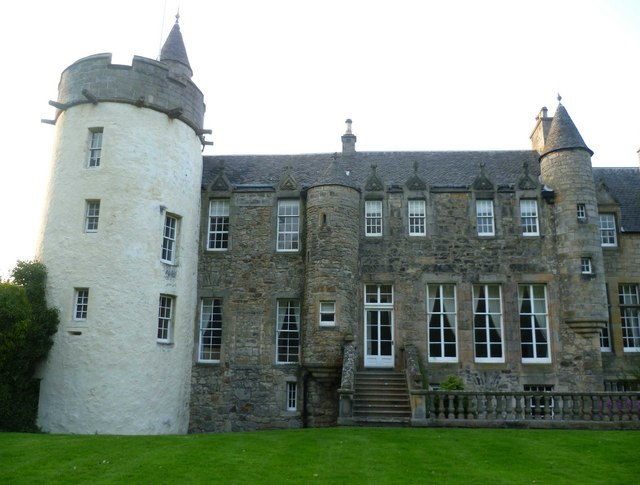
Craigcrook Castle

Constable was born at Carnbee, Fife, son of the land steward to the Earl of Kellie.

In 1788 Archibald was apprenticed to Peter Hill, an Edinburgh bookseller, based on the High Street south of the Mercat Cross. In 1795 Constable started in business for himself as a dealer in rare books, taking a unit immediately opposite Peter Hill, on the north side of the Mercat Cross. He was then living in a house in Calton village on the edge of Calton Hill.

He bought the rights to publish the Scots Magazine in 1801, and John Leyden, the orientalist, became its editor. In 1800 Constable began the Farmer's Magazine, and in November 1802 he issued the first number of the Edinburgh Review, under the nominal editorship of Sydney Smith; Lord Jeffrey, was, however, the guiding spirit of the review, having as his associates Lord Brougham, Sir Walter Scott, Henry Hallam, John Playfair and afterwards Lord Macaulay.

In 1802 he published "Minstrelsy of the Scottish Border" by Walter Scott and continued a lifelong friendship with Scott from at least this point. Walter Scott was primarily an advocate, and the Edinburgh courts were only 100m from Constable's shop.

From at least 1809 his head clerk Robert Cadell had a financial interest in the firm and in 1811 he replaced Hunter of Blackness as a partner, and from 1812 was sole partner with Constable.

Constable made a new departure in publishing by the generosity of his terms to authors. Writers for the Edinburgh Review were paid at an unprecedented rate, and Constable offered Scott 1000 guineas in advance for Marmion. In 1804 A. G. Hunter of Blackness joined Constable as partner, bringing considerable capital into the firm, which thereafter was styled Archibald Constable & Co. In 1805, jointly with Longman & Co., Constable published Scott's Lay of the Last Minstrel, and in 1807 Marmion. He also published four of James Hogg's books, The Mountain Bard (1807), The Shepherd's Guide (1807), The Forest Minstrel (1810) and Poetical Works (1822).

In 1808 a split took place between Constable and Sir Walter Scott, who transferred his business to the publishing firm of John Ballantyne & Co., for which he supplied most of the capital. In 1813, however, a reconciliation took place. Ballantyne was in difficulties, and Constable again became Scott's publisher, a condition being that the firm of John Ballantyne & Co. should be wound up at an early date, though Scott retained his interest in the printing business of James Ballantyne & Co. Around 1810 he bought a house at the head of Craigs Close, nearby his shop. The premises was previously the house of William Creech and historically had been the home of Andro Hart. The printworks linked to this house seem to have been leased by Constable since around 1800.

In 1808 he served as Moderator of the High Constables of Edinburgh.

In 1812 Constable, who had admitted Robert Cathcart and Robert Cadell as partners on Hunter's retirement, purchased the copyright of the Encyclopædia Britannica, adding the supplement (6 vols, 1816-1824) to the 4th, 5th and 6th editions. In 1814 he bought the copyright of Waverley. This was issued anonymously; but in a short time 12,000 copies were disposed of, Scott's other novels following in quick succession. The firm also published the Annual Register.

Constable played a key role in the 1825 purchase of the Astorga Collection by the library of the Faculty of Advocates. The collection, comprising 3,716 pre-1800 volumes which ones belonged to Spain's 14th Marquis of Astorga, is now held by the National Library of Scotland.

Through over-speculation, complications arose, and in 1826 a financial crash occurred. Constable's London agents stopped payment, leading to his failure for over £250,000. James Ballantyne & Co. also went bankrupt, owing nearly £90,000. The collapse of both firms had a significant impact on Sir Walter Scott.

Constable started business afresh, and began in 1827 Constable's Miscellany of Original and Selected Works consisting of a series of original works, and of standard books republished in a cheap form, thus making one of the earliest and most famous attempts to popularize high-quality literature.

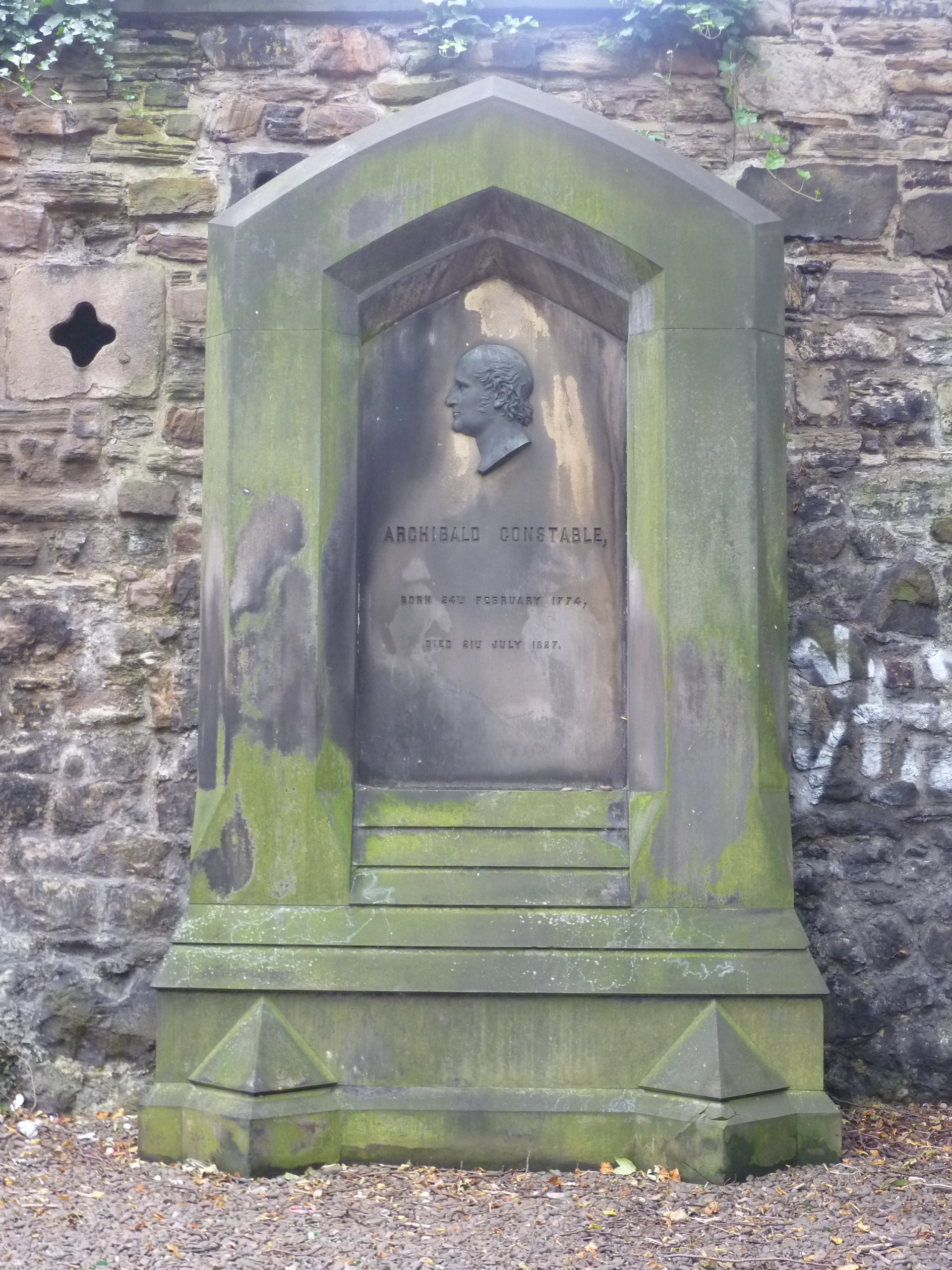
Constable's grave in the Old Calton Burying Ground in Edinburgh

Constable died of dropsy (which had plagued him for several years) at home, 3 Park Place in Edinburgh, on 21 July 1827, but his firm survived, and the Constable publishing business continued in the twentieth century, issuing a wide range of fiction and non-fiction books. It continues today as Constable & Robinson.

Park Place was a small square north of George Square which was demolished later in the 19th century to build the new medical buildings for Edinburgh University.

== Family ==
Constable was first married to Mary Willison (d.1814) daughter of David Willison, a rival Edinburgh printer. They lived in Craigcrook Castle in western Edinburgh. Among their children were a son, Thomas, and a daughter, Elizabeth.

Their son, Thomas Constable FRSE (1812-1881) took over his printing business on his father's death. In 1839 he was appointed printer and publisher in Edinburgh to Queen Victoria, and issued, among other notable series, Constable's Educational Series, and Constable's Foreign Miscellany.

After Mary's death, Constable remarried in 1818, to Charlotte Neale, daughter of John Neale.

Thomas Constable married Lucia Anne Cowan, daughter of Alexander Cowan, an Edinburgh paper-maker (who clearly would have had business links with a major publishing firm such as Constables). They lived at 11 Thistle Street in Edinburgh's First New Town. Their son was also Archibald David Constable FRSE LLD (1843-1915), named after his grandfather, and followed in the family tradition as a printer. In 1865 he became a partner in the firm, and when Thomas retired in 1893 the firm continued under the name of T. & A. Constable and in 1902 the firm was publishing under the name of Archibald Constable & Co. Ltd.

Their daughter, Elizabeth Constable (d.1818) married his junior publishing partner, Robert Cadell of Ratho.

== Publications ==
- Barry, George (1805). The History of the Orkney Islands. Edinburgh and London: Archibald Constable and Longman Hurst.
- Gordon, Robert (1813) [Printed from original manuscript 1580 - 1656]. A Genealogical History of the Earldom of Sutherland. Edinburgh: Printed by George Ramsay and Co. for Archibald Constable and Company Edinburgh; and White, Cochrance and Co. London.
- Stewart, David of Garth (1822). Sketches of the character, manners, and present state of the Highlanders of Scotland: with details of the military service of the Highland regiments. Vol. II. Edinburgh and London: A. Constable and Longman, Hurst. ISBN 9780665540820.
- Stewart, David of Garth (1825). Sketches of The Character, Manners, And Present State of The Highlanders of Scotland: With Details of The Military Service of The Highland Regiments. Vol. I. Edinburgh and London: A. Constable and Longman, Hurst.

== In fiction ==
The character John Paterson ('the Bishop') in John Paterson's Mare, James Hogg's allegorical satire on the Edinburgh publishing scene first published in the Newcastle Magazine in 1825, is based on Archibald Constable.

== See also ==
- Archibald Fullarton
- George Washington Bacon
- Moubray House
