= Blackhall, Edinburgh =

Suburb of Edinburgh, Scotland

Coordinates: 55°57′31.63″N 3°15′11.07″W

Blackhall
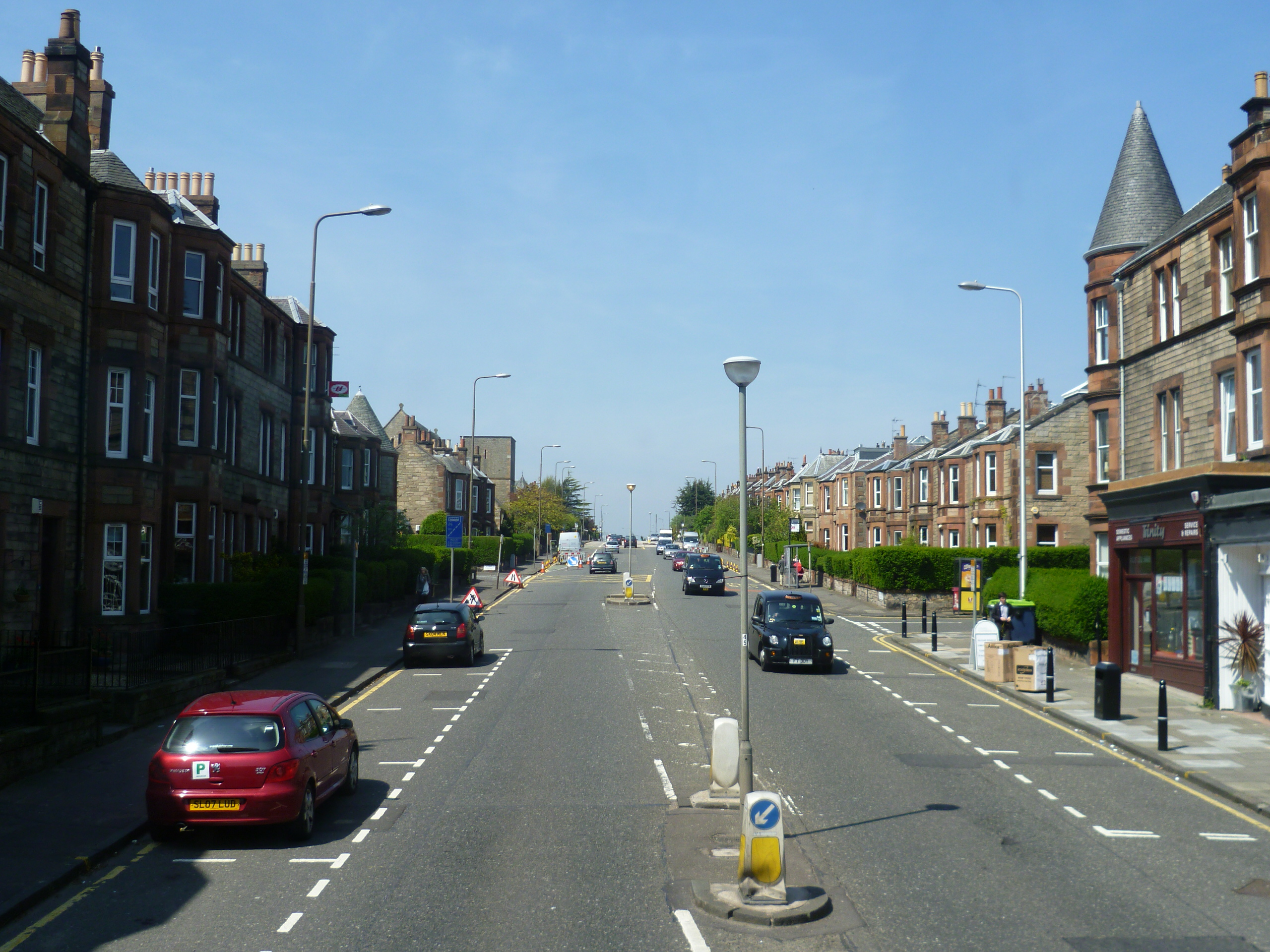
- Blackhall

- Location within the City of Edinburgh council area Location within Scotland
- OS grid reference: NT215745
- Council area: City of Edinburgh
- Lieutenancy area: Edinburgh
- Country: Scotland
- Sovereign state: United Kingdom
- Post town: EDINBURGH
- Postcode district: EH4
- Dialling code: 0131
- Police: Scotland
- Fire: Scottish
- Ambulance: Scottish
- UK Parliament: Edinburgh North and Leith Edinburgh West
- Scottish Parliament: Edinburgh Western

Blackhall is a suburb in the north west of the Scottish capital city Edinburgh. It is a mainly residential area with amenities including a small number of shops.

== Geography ==
Most of the housing in the neighbourhood was constructed in the inter-war period, although the recent housing boom has seen new development on the north east slope of Corstorphine Hill.

Blackhall has numerous community and church-based groups including a bowling club, two Probus Clubs, and a horticultural society. There is a local community council, Craigleith/Blackhall, that serves the area.

== Etymology ==
According to Stuart Harris in The Place Names Of Edinburgh the "Black-" in the placename could derive either from the Anglian blaec or Scots blac meaning simply black, and the "-hall" ending is from the Anglian halh or Scots haugh meaning land beside or in the bend of a river.

The local school, Blackhall Primary School, has recently been extended and parts rebuilt, as has the local Royal High School which serves Blackhall.

== Nearby areas ==
One of the main arterial routes of the city goes through the area, which borders Drylaw, Davidson's Mains, and Craigcrook.

== Notable residents ==
- John Horne lived at 12 Keith Crescent
- Francis Jeffrey, Lord Jeffrey (1773–1850), judge and editor of the Edinburgh Review. There is a street named after him in Blackhall
