= Thomas Bell (minister) =

Scottish minister, theologian and translator (1733–1802)

Thomas Bell (1733–1802) was a Scottish minister, known as a theologian and translator.

== Life ==
Bell was born at Moffat on 24 December 1733, and attended the parish school there. He was sent to the University of Edinburgh while still young, completed the course and continued theological studies at the university.

Instead of seeking license from the Church of Scotland, Bell applied to the Presbytery of Relief, founded by Thomas Gillespie in 1761. He was licensed in 1767, and the same year was settled as minister of the Relief congregation at Jedburgh, as successor to Thomas Boston the younger; he remained there for ten years. In 1777 he was translated to a large congregation of the Relief church in Glasgow. This move was without the consent of the Relief Synod, and three years passed before a rupture was resolved.

Bell was an opponent of hymn-singing in his church. Ill for about five years at the end of his life, his ministry was carried out by a substitute. He died in Glasgow on 15 October 1802.

== Works ==
In 1780 Bell published The Standard of the Spirit lifted up against the Enemy coming in like a Flood, and in 1785 appeared A Proof of the True and Eternal Godhead of the Lord Jesus Christ. From the Dutch original of Peter Allinga he translated The Satisfaction of Christ (1790). This was a work opposed to Socinians, and Bell was responding in it to the controversy over the Unitarian views of William McGill of Ayr; he also wrote a work of his own, The Articles of Ayr Contrasted with the Oracles of Truth. He translated from the Latin of Herman Witsius The Controversies stated in Great Britain under the Unhappy Names of Antinomians and Neonomians (posthumously published), as well as A View of the Covenants of Works and Grace, and Sermons on various Important Subjects (1814).

== Family ==
Bell was father of James Bell the geographical writer.
