= Andrew Gray (17th-century divine) =

Scottish divine

- Church: Outer High Church, Glasgow
- Predecessor: Patrick Gillespie
- Successor: Robert MacWard

Orders
- Ordination: 3 November 1653

Personal details
- Born: 1633
- Died: 8 February 1656 (aged 22–23) interred at Blackadder's or St Fergus's aisle, Glasgow Cathedral
- Spouse: Rachel, daughter of George Baillie of Jerviswood and Margaret Johnston
- Children: William, Rachel, Robert
- Education: St. Andrews and Edinburgh

Andrew Gray (1633–1656), was a Scottish divine. Gray was baptised on 23 August 1633. He was the son of Sir William Gray of Pittendrum, and Egidia Smith. He graduated from St Andrews University with an M.A. in 1651. He was licensed as a minister in 1653 and called on 5 September. He was ordained by the Protesters on 3 November 1653 but his ministry was a short one. He died on 8 February 1656.

== Early life ==
Gray was born in a house still standing on the north side of the Lawnmarket, Edinburgh, in August 1633 (bap. reg. 23). He was fourth son and eleventh child in a family of twenty-one, his father being Sir William Gray of Pittendrum (died 1648), an eminent merchant and royalist, descended from Andrew, first lord Gray. His mother was Geils or Egidia Smyth, sister to Sir John Smith of Grothill, provost of Edinburgh from 1643 to 1646.

== Education ==
Andrew in his childhood was playful and fond of pleasure; but while he was quite young his thoughts were suddenly given a serious turn by reflecting on the piety of a beggar whom he met near Leith. Resolved to enter the ministry, he studied at the universities both of St. Andrews and Edinburgh. He graduated at the former in 1651. Gray was one of that band of youthful preachers who were powerfully influenced by the venerable Leighton. His talents and learning favourably impressed Principal Gillespie.

== Ministry ==
He was licensed to preach in 1653, and was ordained to the collegiate charge of the Outer High Church of Glasgow on 3 November 1653, although only in his twenty-first year, notwithstanding some remonstrance. One of the remonstrants, Robert Baillie, refers in his Letters and Journals to the 'high flown, rhetorical style' of the youthful preacher, and describes his ordination as taking place 'over the belly of the town's protestation.' He seems to have spoken with an unusual voice and spoke too quietly to hear at first. Following a communion in Killellan he seems to have learned to project his voice.

His ministry proved eminently successful, and although only of three years' duration, in the profound impression produced during his lifetime, and the sustained popularity of his published works, Gray had few rivals in the Scottish church. When he was twenty-two, Gray expressed the desire to see his Lord before his upcoming birthday. Six months later, on 8 Feb. 1656, his wish was granted. Andrew Gray died after a brief illness, of a 'purple' fever, and was interred in Blackadder's or St. Fergus's Aisle, Glasgow Cathedral. On the walls of the aisle his initials and date of death may be seen deeply incised.

== Family ==
Gray married Rachael, daughter of Robert Baillie of Jerviswood and Mellerstain, and Margaret Johnston, on 31 March 1654 and had a son, William, born at Glasgow in March 1655, who probably died young. He had also a daughter, Rachael, who was served heir to her father on 26 June 1669. His widow remarried George Hutcheson, minister at Irvine.

== Works ==
Many of Gray's sermons and communion addresses were taken down at the time of delivery, chiefly in shorthand by his wife, and were published posthumously. Some yet remain in unpublished manuscripts. Pre-Restoration editions are extremely rare, but a few are still extant. The following are the chief editions known:

1. 'The Mystery of Faith opened up: the Great Salvation and sermons on Death,’ edited by the Revs. R. Trail and J. Stirling, Glasgow, 1659 (in possession of the writer), and London, 1660, 12mo (Brit. Mus.), both with a dedication to Sir Archibald Johnston, lord Warriston, afterwards suppressed; Glasgow, 1668, 12mo; Edinburgh, 1669, 1671, 1678, 1697, 12mo; ten editions in 12mo, Glasgow, between 1714 and 1766. The sermons on 'The Great Salvation' and on 'Death' appeared separately, the former edited by the Rev. Robert Trail, London, 1694, 16mo, the latter at Edinburgh, 1814, 12mo.
2. 'Great and Precious Promises,’ edited by the Revs. Robert Trail and John Stirling, Edinburgh, 1669, 12mo (Brit. Mus.); Glasgow, 1669, 12mo; Edinburgh, 1671 and 1678; and six editions, Glasgow, in 12mo, between 1715 and 1764.
3. 'Directions and Instigations to the Duty of Prayer,’ Glasgow, 1669, 12mo (Mitchell Library, Glasgow); Edinburgh, 1670, 1671, 1678; eight editions, Glasgow, between 1715 and 1771.
4. 'The Spiritual Warfare,’ Edinburgh, 1671, 12mo (in possession of the writer); London, 1673, 8vo, with preface by Thomas Manton; Edinburgh, 1678, 12mo; London, 1679, 12mo; Edinburgh, 1693, 1697; seven editions, Glasgow, in 12mo, between 1715 and 1764; Aberdeen, 1832, 12mo.
5. 'Eleven Communion Sermons,’ with letter written by Gray on his deathbed to Lord Warriston, Edinburgh, 1716, 8vo (dedicated to John Clerk of Penicuik); five editions, 12mo, Glasgow, between 1730 and 1771.

The works here numbered 1 to 5 were reissued as 'The Whole Works of the Reverend and Pious Mr. Andrew Gray,’ Glasgow, 1762, 1789, 1803, 1813, 8vo; Paisley, 1762, 1769, 8vo; Falkirk, 1789, 8vo; Aberdeen, 1839, 8vo (with preface by the Rev. W. King Tweedie). From a manuscript collection of sixty-one other sermons, eleven were published as vol. i. of an intended series, with preface by the Rev. John Willison of Dundee, in 1746. The fifty remaining sermons appeared later in another volume as 'Select Sermons by ... Mr. Andrew Gray,’ Edinburgh, 1765, 8vo; Falkirk, 1792, 8vo. From the 1746 volume was reissued separately, with a Gaelic translation by J. Gillies (Glasgow, 1851, 12mo), the sermon on Canticles iii. 11. Two single sermons, not apparently published elsewhere, one on Exod. xxxiv. 6, the other on Job xxiii. 3, appeared respectively at Edinburgh in 1774 and at Glasgow in 1782. His Works were republished in 1989 and 1992

== Bibliography ==
- Scots Peerage, iv., 289
- Wodrow's Anal., ii., 261, 364
- Glasg. Tests, and Bapt. Reg.
- Edin. Bapt. Reg.
- Brodie's Diary
