= James Browne (writer) =

Scottish advocate, scholar and man of letters (1793–1841)

James Browne LLD (1793 – 8 April 1841), Scottish advocate, scholar and man of letters.

== Life ==
He was born at Whitefield, Perthshire. He was educated at the universities of Edinburgh and St. Andrews, where he studied law. He wrote a Sketch of the History of Edinburgh, for Ewbank's Picturesque Views of that city (1823–1825).

In 1826 he became a member of the Faculty of Advocates, and obtained the honorary doctorate of LL.D. from King's College, University of Aberdeen. His works include a Critical Examination of Macculloch's Work on the Highlands and Islands of Scotland (1826), Aperçu sur les Hieroglyphes d'Egypte (Paris, 1827), a Vindication of the Scottish Bar from the Attacks of Mr. Broughton, and A History of the Highlands and of the Highland Clans (1834–1836). He was appointed editor of the Caledonian Mercury in 1827; and two years later he became sub-editor of the seventh edition of the Encyclopædia Britannica working with Macvey Napier, to which he contributed a large number of articles.

In the 1830s he lived at 11 Comely Bank in Edinburgh, and was frequently visited by his friend Daniel O'Connell.

Browne died at Woodbine Cottage on York Road in the Trinity area on 8 April 1841. He is buried within the floor of the tower in Duddingston Kirk.
