= John Parker Lawson =

Scottish minister (died 1852

John Parker Lawson (died 1852) was a minister or deacon of the Episcopal Church of Scotland and an ecclesiastical historian.

== Life ==
Ordained a minister in the Episcopal Church of Scotland, he was for some time a chaplain in the British Army. Later he lived in Edinburgh, writing for the booksellers.

== Works ==
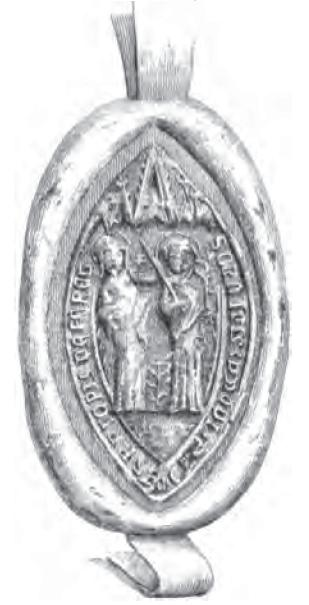
Seal of Perth Charterhouse

His works include:

- The Life of George Wishart of Pitarrow, Edinburgh, 1827.
- Life and Times of William Laud, Lord Archbishop of Canterbury, 2 vols., London, 1829.
- The Bible Cyclopedia, Containing the Biography, Geography and Natural History of the Holy Scriptures 3 vols (vol.I, 1829) (vol.III, 1850)
- The History of Remarkable Conspiracies connected with English History during the Fifteenth, Sixteenth, and Seventeenth Centuries, 2 vols., Edinburgh, 1829. This was issued in Constable's Miscellany.
- The Roman Catholic Church in Scotland, Edinburgh, 1836.
- Gazetteer of the Old and New Testaments, with Introductory Essay by William Fleming, 2 vols., Edinburgh, 1838.
- Historical Tales of the Wars of Scotland, 2 vols., Edinburgh, 1839.
- History of the Scottish Episcopal Church from the Revolution to the Present Time, Edinburgh, 1843.
- The Episcopal Church of Scotland from the Reformation to the Revolution, Edinburgh, 1844.

Lawson also edited in 1844 the first two volumes of Robert Keith's History of the Affairs of Church and State in Scotland for the Spottiswoode Society, and wrote the letterpress for Clarkson Stanfield and James Duffield Harding's Scotland Delineated, Edinburgh, 1847–54.

- The Book of Perth : An Illustration of the Moral and Ecclesiastical State of Scotland before and after the Reformation, Edinburgh, 1847.
- History of the Abbey and Palace of Holyroodhouse, Edinburgh, 1848.
- Historical Tales of the Scottish Wars, and of the border raids, forays and conflicts, 2 vols (vol.I, 1848; vol.II, 1849)
- Scotland Delineated a Series of Views of the Principal Cities and Towns, particularly of Edinburgh and its Environs; of the Cathedrals, Abbeys, and other Monastic Remains; the Castles and Baronial Mansions; the Mountains and Rivers, Sea-coast and other Grand and Picturesque Scenery, London, 1850.
