= James Bell (geographical writer) =

James Bell (1769 – 3 May 1833) was a Scottish geographical author.

== Biography ==
He was born in Jedburgh in 1769. At the age of eight he went to Glasgow, where his father, the Rev. Thomas Bell, was appointed, in 1777, minister of Dovehill Chapel. A sickly child, he managed to acquire an education. His first employment was as a weaver, serving an apprenticeship. In 1790 he went into trade on his own account, as a manufacturer of cotton goods. In the mercantile depression of 1793, he gave up his business, and for some years was as a warper in the warehouses of manufacturers. His father gave him a small annuity which allowed him to study.

About 1806 he began to earn a livelihood as tutor in Greek and Latin to university students. Subject to attacks of asthma to which he had always been subject, he left Glasgow about ten or twelve years before his death and retired into the country, living in a cottage at Campsie, Stirlingshire, twelve miles north of Glasgow. There he died on 3 May 1833, and was buried.

== Works ==
Bell first published about 1815, when he contributed chapters to the Glasgow Geography, a popular work published by Khull, Blackie, & Co. In 1824 he wrote An Examination of the various Opinions that have been held respecting the Sources of the Ganges and the Correctness of the Lama's Map of Thibet. It was published as Article 2 in Critical Researches in Philology and Geography, an anonymous volume, the joint work of James Bell and a young student John Bell (no relation). He was then given the task of preparing and editing an unabridged edition of Charles Rollin's Ancient History, Glasgow, 1828, 3 vols. The notes, with the life of the author by Bell, made its reputation. It was followed by his System of Geography, Popular and Scientific, Glasgow, 1830, 6 vols. The chapters on the history of geography contained in the third volume of Rollin and in the sixth volume of his 'System of Geography' were followed by other authors. Posthumous was A Comprehensive Gazetteer of England and Wales, Glasgow 1836, 4 vols. had a section on the cartography of England and Wales, compiled mainly from Richard Gough's British Topography.

Bell's way of working was at issue in a later court case brought by Samuel Lewis against Archibald Fullarton.
