= Craigcrook =

Suburb of Edinburgh, Scotland

Coordinates: 55°57′32″N 3°16′2″W

Junction of March and Craigcrook Roads

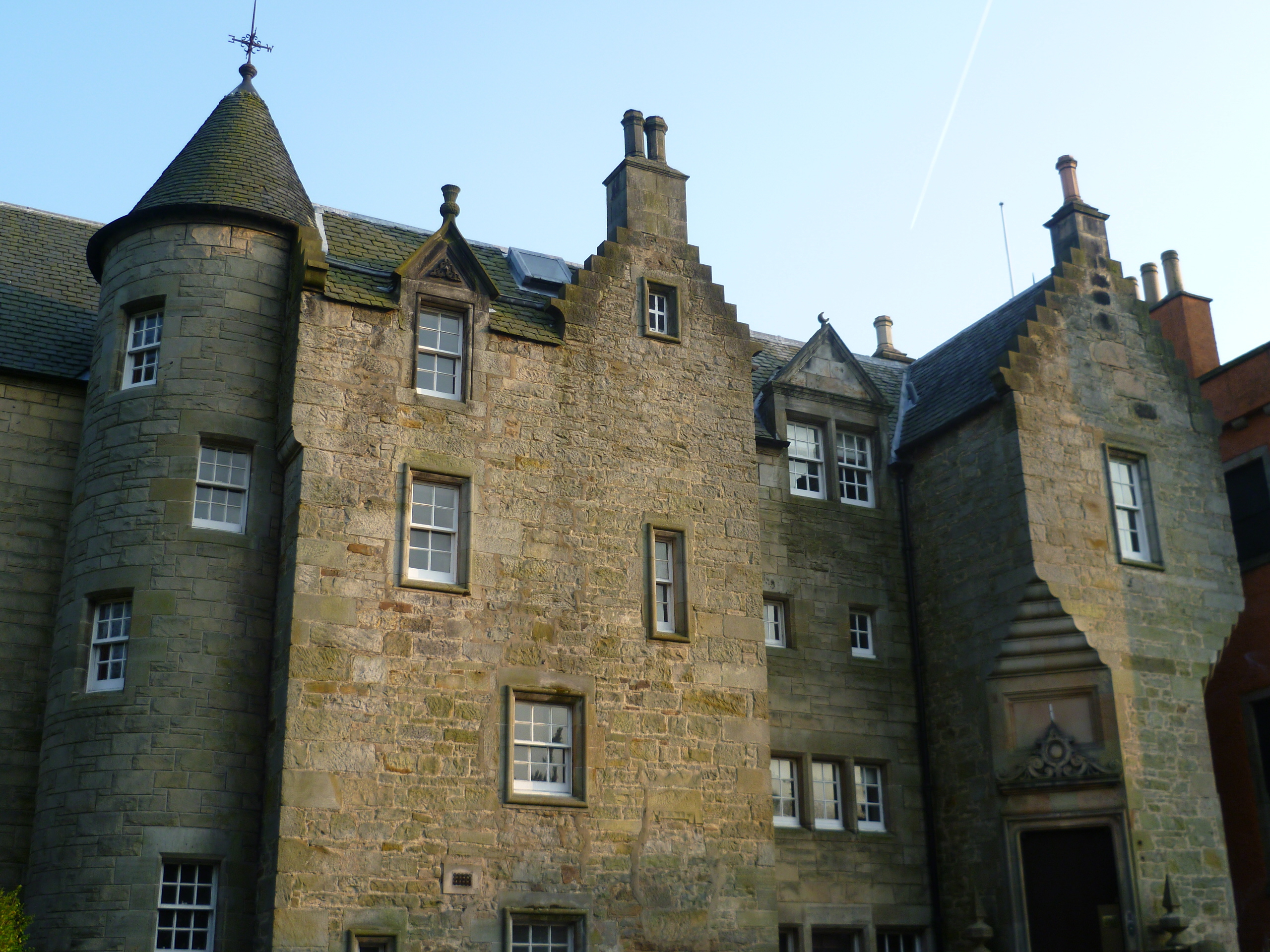
Craigcrook Castle

Craigcrook is a suburb of Edinburgh, Scotland, best known for Craigcrook Castle. It is fairly affluent, and lies on the north east slopes of Corstorphine Hill. It is near Clerwood, and Blackhall. Davidson's Mains lies to the north, separated from the district by the A90 - Queensferry Road.

Apart from Craigcrook Castle and a few isolated farm buildings the area was featureless until 1920, when it became part of the several open lands (including Craigentinny and Drylaw) acquired by the then Edinburgh Corporation and used for low density bungalow development. The low density and distance from the city centre renders the area difficult to support local small shops and public transport.

There are no supermarkets whatsoever within the district, but the adjoining districts of Davidson's Mains and Blackhall (Craigleith) cater to local needs.
