= John Marius Wilson =

British writer and editor, notable for gazetteers, c. 1805–1885

- Born: c. 1805; Lochmaben, Scotland
- Died: 1885 (aged 80); Edinburgh, Scotland
- Occupations: Writer and editor

John Marius Wilson (c. 1805–1885) was a British writer and an editor, most notable for his gazetteers. The Imperial Gazetteer of England and Wales (published 1870–1872), was a substantial topographical dictionary in six volumes. It was a companion to his Imperial Gazetteer of Scotland, published 1854–1857.

He was born in Lochmaben, Dumfriesshire, in about 1805, and was ordained as a Congregationalist minister, working for a time in County Galway, Ireland. From the late 1840s onwards, he devoted himself to writing and editing, living in Edinburgh, where he died in 1885, aged 80.

== Selected works ==
- The Farmer's Dictionary or a cyclopedia of agriculture in all its departments, principles, methods, recent improvements and business affairs as taught and practice by the most distinguished British agriculturists of the present day (n.d.)
- The Rural Cyclopedia: or a general dictionary of agriculture, and of the arts, sciences, instruments, and practice, necessary to the farmer, stockfarmer, gardener, forester, landsteward, farrier, &c. (1847–1849)
- The Potato, its diseases, uses, etc. (1850)
- A Memoir of Field-marshal, the Duke of Wellington; with interspersed notices of his principal associates in council, and companions and opponents in arms (1853–1854)
- The Imperial Gazetteer of Scotland : or, Dictionary of Scottish topography 2 vols. (1854–1857)
- Landscapes of Interesting Localities mentioned in the Holy Scriptures ... (1855)
- The Divine Architect, or The wonders of creation (1857)
- The land of Scott; or, Tourists' guide to Abbotsford, the country of the Tweed and its tributaries, and St. Mary's loch (1858)
- Earth, Sea, and Sky; or, The hand of God in the works of nature (1859)
- Nelsons' hand-book to Scotland: for tourists. T. Nelson and Sons. 1860.(1860)
- The Imperial Gazetteer of England and Wales; embracing recent changes in counties etc.; and forming a complete description of the country (1870–1872)
- Nature, Man, and God: a contrib. to the scientific teaching of to-day (1885)
