= George Barry (author) =

George Barry (1748–1805) was a Scottish minister, the author of a History of the Orkney Islands.

== Life ==
Barry was a native of Berwickshire. He studied at the University of Edinburgh. After receiving a licence as a preacher from the Edinburgh presbytery of the Church of Scotland, he continued to act as tutor in a gentleman's family until in 1782 he obtained a presentation to the second charge of Kirkwall. The dislike of a portion of the congregation to his preaching resulted before long in the formation of a Secession congregation in the parish. In 1793 he was translated to Shapinsay. He received in 1804 the degree of D.D. from the university of Edinburgh.

== Works ==
Shortly before his death at Shapinsay on 11 May 1805 he published a History of the Orkney Islands, including a view of the ancient and modern inhabitants, their monuments of antiquity, their natural history, the present state of their agriculture, manufactures, and commerce, and the means of their improvement. A second edition, with additions and improvements by the Rev. James Headrick, appeared in 1808. Barry's History contains his own research, but depends also on the unpublished manuscripts of George Low.
