= Imperial Gazetteer of Scotland =

Topographical dictionary of Scotland

The Imperial Gazetteer of Scotland is a topographical dictionary first published in parts between 1854 and 1857, edited by the Reverend John Marius Wilson. It also appeared in two undated volumes in 1868 and was described as "A Dictionary of Scottish Topography compiled from the most recent authorities, and forming a complete body of Scottish Geography, Physical, Statistical and Historical."

The Gazetteer contains a detailed description of Scotland and a brief article on each county, city, borough, civil parish, and diocese, describing their political and physical features and naming the principal people of each place.

The publishers were A. Fullarton and Co., of London & Edinburgh. The work was later joined as a companion by Wilson's Imperial Gazetteer of England and Wales, which followed in six volumes between 1870 and 1872.

== See also ==
- Gazetteer
