= Drylaw =

Area of Edinburgh, Scotland

Coordinates: 55.966°N 3.243°W

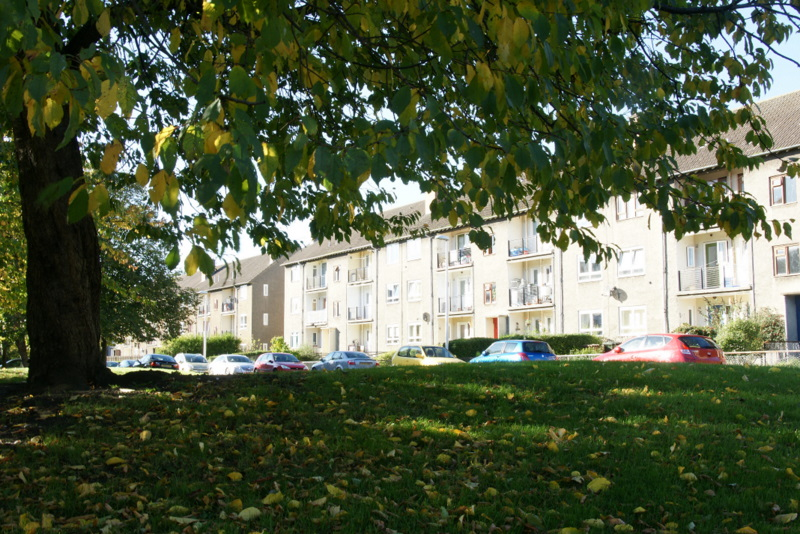
- Telford Drive

- Location within the City of Edinburgh council area Location within Scotland
- OS grid reference: NT2275
- Civil parish: Edinburgh
- Council area: City of Edinburgh
- Lieutenancy area: Edinburgh
- Country: Scotland
- Sovereign state: United Kingdom
- Post town: EDINBURGH
- Postcode district: EH4
- Dialling code: 0131
- Police: Scotland
- Fire: Scottish
- Ambulance: Scottish
- UK Parliament: Edinburgh North and Leith Edinburgh West
- Scottish Parliament: Edinburgh Northern and Leith Edinburgh Western

Drylaw is an area in the north west of Edinburgh, the capital of Scotland, located between Blackhall and Granton. It forms the community of Drylaw–Telford. Drylaw used to belong to the younger branch of the Foresters of Corstorphine. Formerly the estate of Drylaw House, built in 1718, the home of the Loch family, the area became the site of a major housing scheme in the 1950s designed to rehouse the occupants of Leith. It is on the A902 road. Its name comes from the Scots language and means "hill without a spring".

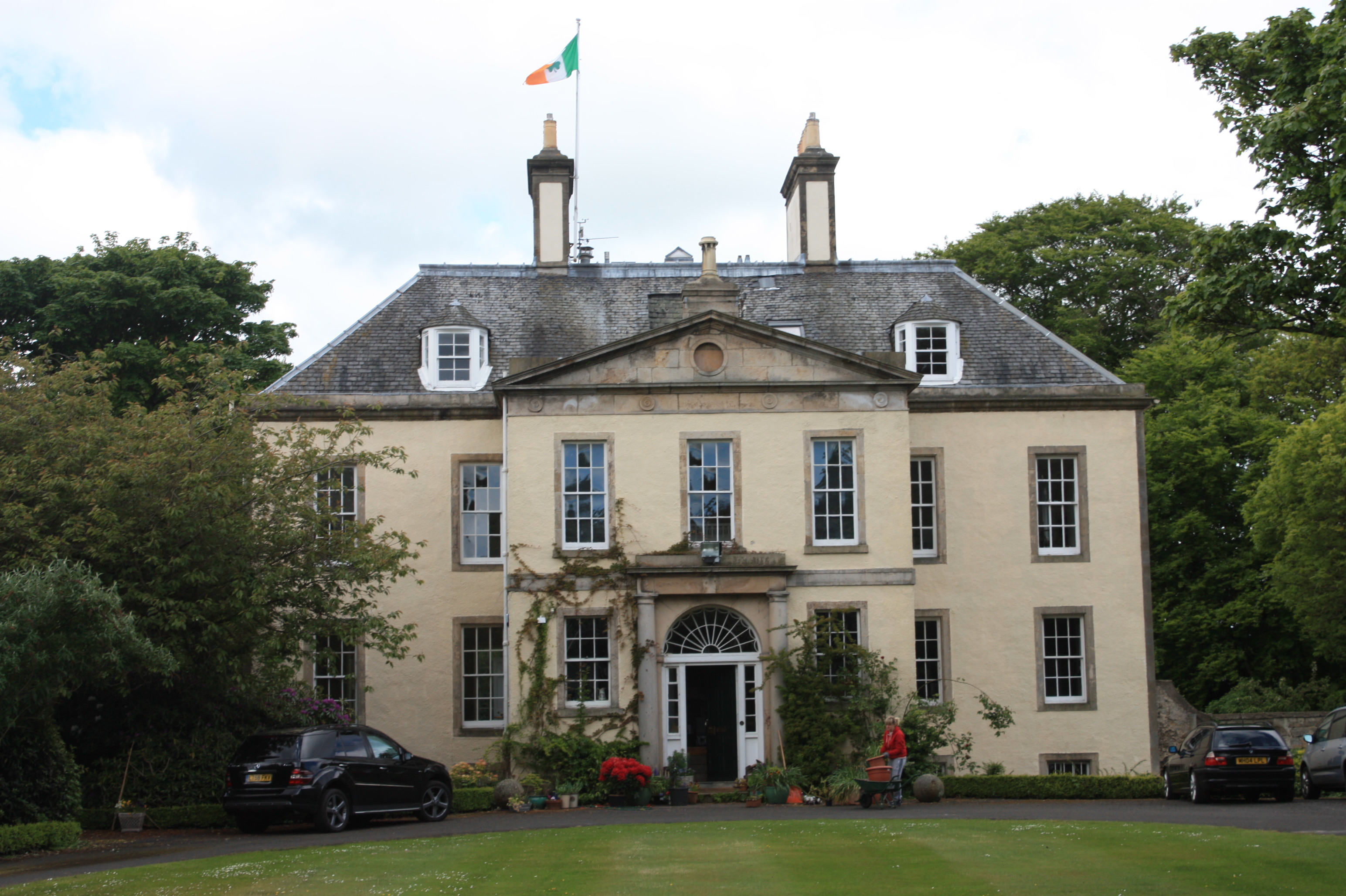
Drylaw House, Edinburgh

== Buildings ==
see

- Old Drylaw House, now ruinous, a small mansion dating from the early 17th century
- Drylaw House, a classical mansion dating from 1718 with alterations of 1786
- Drylaw Parish Church, by Sir William Kininmonth 1956

== Notable residents ==
- Baron Loch of Drylaw
- Admiral Francis Erskine Loch (1788–1868) born and raised in Drylaw House
- Graham Hastings of the band Young Fathers was raised in Drylaw.
