= 1823 in literature =

This article contains information about the literary events and publications of 1823.

== Events ==
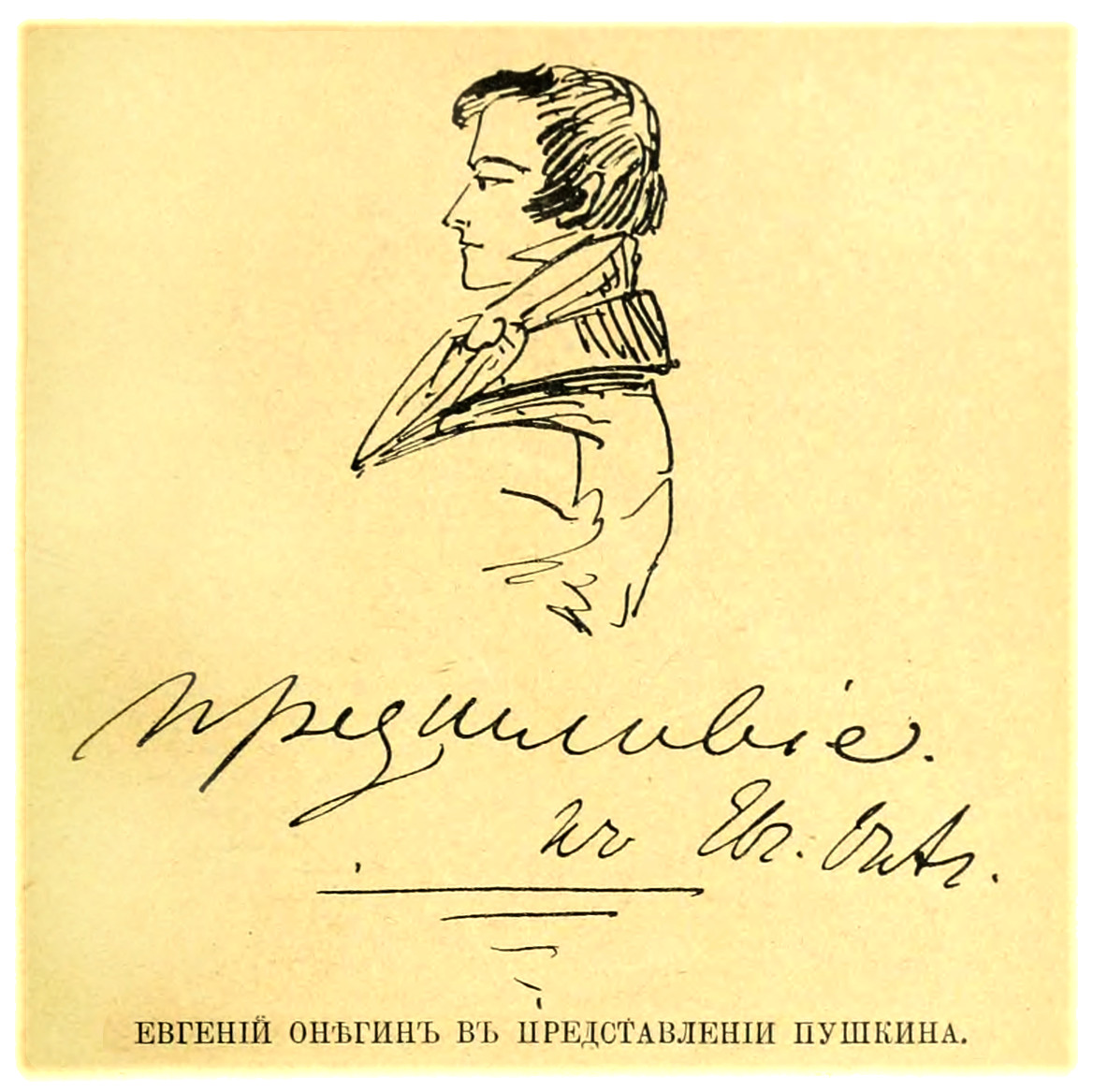
Eugene Onegin as imagined by Alexander Pushkin, 1830.

- February 7 – The Bannatyne Club is inaugurated by Sir Walter Scott and others as a text publication society to print by subscription rare texts on the history, literature and traditions of Scotland. The membership in the Bannatyne Club was much more diverse than that found in more elite clubs, such as the Roxburghe Club, The new club included members from the publishing and printing trades in addition to lawyers. While the club was still elite, contributions by amateurs were considered valuable. This made the Bannaytne club a transitional organization between the elitism of previous clubs and the open policy of its successors. Like many gentlemen's club's of the 18th and 19th centuries, the Bannatyne Club allowed its to members engage in homosocial relations. For its members, the club served to emphasize Scotland's distinct identity by publishing literary and historical texts. Between 1823 and 1827, the membership expanded rapidly, increasing from thirty-one to one hundred members. The members were required to contribute five guineas each year as a membership fee.
- May 23 – Russian writer Alexander Pushkin begins work on his verse novel Eugene Onegin.
- June – John Gibson Lockhart's Reginald Dalton, published anonymously by Blackwood in Edinburgh, establishes the English "university novel" genre.
- July 28 – The first theatrical adaptation of the Frankenstein story, Presumption; or, the Fate of Frankenstein, opens at the Royal Opera House, Covent Garden in London. On August 29, Mary Shelley attends a performance, the only version of her novel that she would ever see.
- October – Thomas De Quincey's classic essay "On the Knocking at the Gate in Macbeth" appears in this month's issue of The London Magazine.
- December – Samuel Taylor Coleridge, suffering from opium addiction, moves to No. 3, The Grove, Highgate, a house owned by Dr James Gillman.
- December 15 – John Neal sails for England where he became the first American author published in British literary journals.
- December 23 – Clement Clarke Moore's poem, A Visit from St. Nicholas is published anonymously in the Troy, New York, Sentinel, and introduces the eponym "Santa Claus".
- Unknown dates
  - Discovery of the 1603 First Quarto edition of William Shakespeare's Hamlet (a so-called "bad quarto"), by Sir Henry Bunbury, causes scholarly excitement.
  - London actor Edmund Kean reinstates in performance the original, tragic ending of Shakespeare's play King Lear, not generally used since 1681, although it is not well received.
  - The London publisher C. Baldwyn brings out the first English translation of Grimms' Fairy Tales as German Popular Stories. Translated from the Kinder und Haus Märchen collected by MM. Grimm from Oral Tradition. The anonymous translations were made by two lawyers, Edgar Taylor and David Jardine, and the illustrations by George Cruikshank, who is beginning to focus on this medium.

== New books ==
=== Fiction ===
- Willibald Alexis – Walladmor
- James Fenimore Cooper – The Pioneers
- Claire de Duras – Ourika
- John Galt
  - The Entail, or The Lairds of Grippy
  - The Gathering of the West
  - Ringan Gilhaize, or The Covenanters
  - The Spaewife: a tale of the Scottish chronicles
- Thomas Gaspey – Monks of Leadenhead
- Sarah Green – The Nieces
- Jane Harvey – Mountalyth
- William Hazlitt – Liber Amoris
- James Hogg – "The Three Perils of Woman"
- Victor Hugo – Hans of Iceland
- Grace Kennedy – Father Clement
- Caroline Lamb – Ada Reis
- John Gibson Lockhart (anonymous) – Reginald Dalton
- Mary Meeke – What Shall Be, Shall Be
- John Neal
  - Logan, a Family History (London edition)
  - Seventy-Six
  - Randolph, A Novel
  - Errata; or, the Works of Will. Adams
- James Kirke Paulding – Koningsmarke, the Long Finne
- Sir Walter Scott (anonymously)
  - Peveril of the Peak
  - Quentin Durward
  - St. Ronan's Well
- Mary Shelley (anonymously) – Valperga
- John Wilson – The Trials of Margaret Lyndsay
- Anonymous – Popular Tales and Romances of the Northern Nations

=== Children and young people ===
- Mrs Markham (Elizabeth Penrose) – A History of England from the First Invasion by the Romans to the End of the Reign of George III

=== Drama ===
- Aleksander Griboyedov – Woe from Wit («Горе от ума», written)
- Franz Grillparzer - König Ottokars Glück und Ende (written 1823, premiered February 19, 1825 in Vienna's Burgtheater).
- Felicia Hemans – The Vespers of Palermo
- Mary Russell Mitford – Julian
- Richard Brinsley Peake – Presumption; or, the Fate of Frankenstein
- James Planché – Cortez
- William Leman Rede – Sixteen String Jack
- Eugène Scribe
  - L'Héritière (The Heiress, for the Théâtre du Gymnase)
  - Le Menteur Veridique (The Veritable Liar)
- William Tennant – Cardinal Beaton

=== Poetry ===
- Thomas Campbell – The Last Man
- Alphonse de Lamartine – Nouvelles méditations poétiques
- Adam Mickiewicz – Grażyna
- Henry Neele – Poems, Dramatic and Miscellaneous
- Percy Bysshe Shelley – Posthumous Poems

=== Non-fiction ===
- Alexandre Bertrand – Traité du somnambulisme
- William Buckland – Reliquiæ Diluvianæ, or, Observations on the Organic Remains attesting the Action of a Universal Deluge
- Lorenzo Da Ponte – Memorie
- Emmanuel, comte de Las Cases – Le Mémorial de Sainte-Hélène
- John Franklin – Narrative of a Journey to the Shores of the Polar Sea
- Charles Lamb – Essays of Elia (first collection in book form)
- Ethan Smith – View of the Hebrews

== Births ==
- January 1 – Sándor Petőfi, Hungarian poet and revolutionary (died 1849)
- February 28 – Ernest Renan, French philosopher and writer (died 1892)
- March 20 – Ned Buntline (E. Z. C. Judson), American writer and publisher 1886)
- April 6 – Julia Abigail Fletcher Carney, American poet, author, editor, and educator (died 1908)
- April 12 – Alexander Ostrovsky, Russian dramatist (died 1886)
- April 19 – Anna Laetitia Waring, Welsh poet and hymnist (died 1910)
- June 1 – Caroline Howard Jervey, American author, poet, and teacher (died 1877)
- August 2 – Edward Augustus Freeman, English historian and politician (died 1892)
- August 13 – Goldwin Smith, English historian and journalist (died 1910)
- September 23 – Sara Jane Lippincott, American author, poet, correspondent, lecturer, and newspaper founder (died 1904)
- September 27 – Augusta Harvey Worthen, American author and educator (died 1910)
- October 6 – George Henry Boker, American poet, playwright and diplomat (died 1890)
- December 28 – Augusta Theodosia Drane, English religious writer and biographer (died 1894)

== Deaths ==
- February 7 – Ann Radcliffe, English novelist (born 1764)
- February 21 – Charles Wolfe, Irish poet (born 1791)
- April 10 – Karl Leonhard Reinhold, Austrian philosopher (born 1757)
- April 21 – Peter Collett, Danish judge and writer (born 1767)
- May 16 – Ōta Nanpo, Japanese comic poet and painter (born 1749)
- June 19 – William Combe, English writer, poet and adventurer (born 1742)
- August 19 – Robert Bloomfield, English "ploughboy poet" (born 1766)
- August 20 – Friedrich Arnold Brockhaus, German encyclopedia publisher and editor (born 1772)
- September 11 – David Ricardo, English political economist (born 1772)
- November 9 – Vasily Kapnist, Russian poet and dramatist (born 1758)

== Awards ==
- Chancellor's Gold Medal – Winthrop Mackworth Praed
- Newdigate Prize – T. S. Salmon
