= The Journal of Sir Walter Scott =

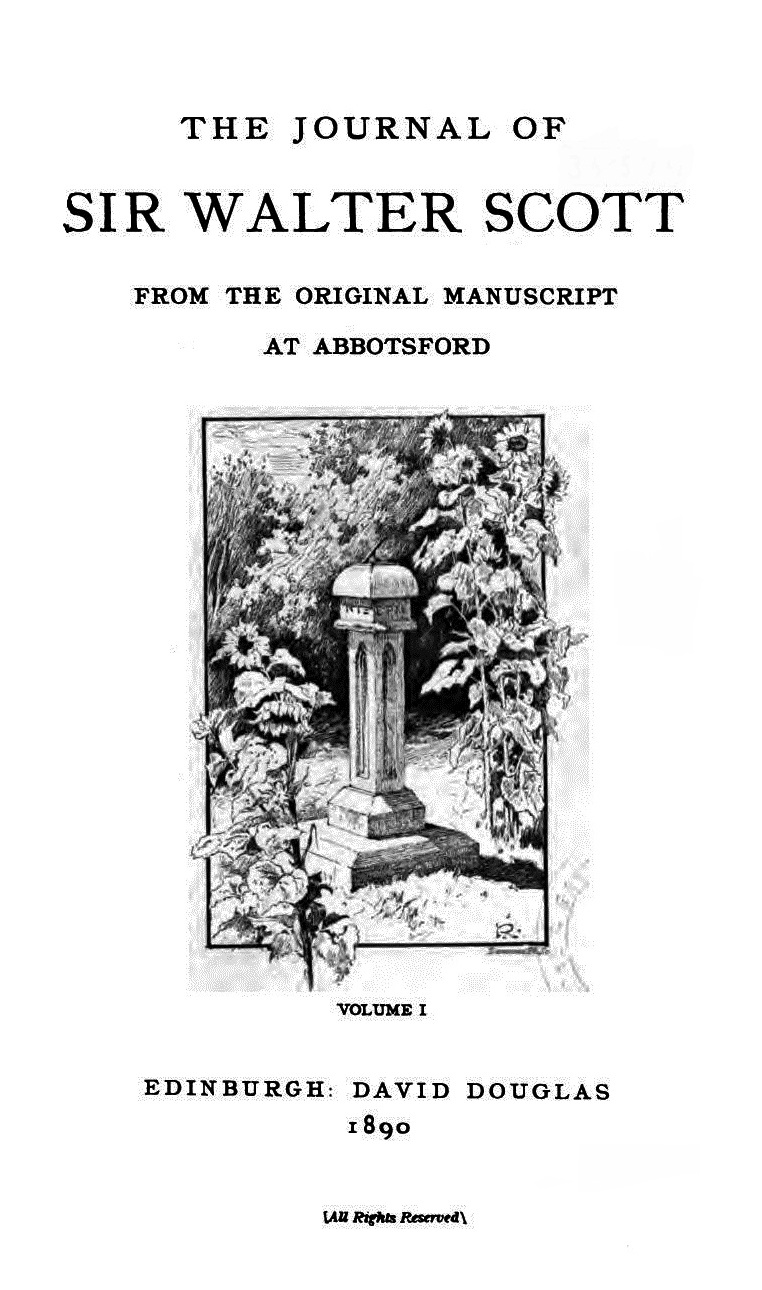
- First edition title page
- Author: Sir Walter Scott
- Original title: Sir Walter Scott Bar^{t} of Abbotsford his Gurnal
- Language: English
- Genre: Diary
- Publisher: David Douglas
- Publication date: 1890
- Publication place: Scotland
- Media type: Print (Hardback & Paperback)
- Pages: 416 pp. + 517 pp. (1890 edition)

The Journal of Sir Walter Scott is a diary which the novelist and poet Walter Scott kept between 1825 and 1832. It records the financial disaster which overtook him at the beginning of 1826, and the efforts he made over the next seven years to pay off his debts by writing bestselling books. Since its first complete publication in 1890 it has attracted high praise, being considered by many critics one of the finest diaries in the language.

== Manuscript ==
The manuscript of the Journal, "a handsome lockd volume" as Scott called it, is of quarto size and bound in vellum. The handwriting displayed in it, especially after his final series of strokes, is so atrociously difficult that, according to the Journal's most recent editor, a perfectly accurate transcription is quite impossible. The title-page bears this inscription:

SIR WALTER SCOTT BAR^{T}
of
Abbotsford
HIS . GURNAL*
Vol. I
As I walked by myself
I talkd to my self
And thus my self said to me
Old Song.

A hard word so spelld on the Authority of Miss Scott now Mrs. Lockhart

The manuscript was kept at Abbotsford after Scott's death, but was bought by the financier J. P. Morgan around 1900, and is now in the Morgan Library in New York.

== Composition ==
In July 1825 Scott acquired a copy of the Diary of Samuel Pepys, which had just been published for the first time, and according to his son-in-law J. G. Lockhart, "I never observed him more delighted with any book whatsoever". Later that year he read a manuscript copy of Byron's 1821 journal and was impressed by Byron's plan of writing a desultory, unsystematic record of his actions, thoughts and memories, which combined the maximum of interest for the reader with the minimum of effort for the writer. Inspired by these two models, he opened his own new diary on November 20, 1825 and wrote the first entry. Only two days later he noted doubts as to the financial stability of the publisher Archibald Constable & Co., which concerned him greatly since he had a large stake in the firm. His worst fears were realized the following year when Constable failed, bringing James Ballantyne & Co., in which Scott was a partner, down with him. Scott found himself personally liable for debts totalling more than £125,000. He resolved to pay off the debts by his own labours as a novelist rather than accept bankruptcy, and the Journal records his unceasing efforts to do this as he writes a series of novels and histories, including Woodstock, The Surgeon's Daughter, The Fair Maid of Perth, Anne of Geierstein, Count Robert of Paris, The Siege of Malta, Bizarro, The Life of Napoleon Buonaparte and Tales of a Grandfather. Other disasters are recorded in the Journal, such as the death of his wife in 1826, and a series of strokes which increasingly undermined his physical and mental powers. In July 1828 he allowed the habit of keeping his journal to lapse for several months, but returned to the task from January 1829 to July 1829 and from May 1830 to May 1831. In October 1831 he again resumed the Journal, having been offered £1000 or £1500 by his publisher Robert Cadell for some record of his forthcoming voyage to Malta and Italy. He finally abandoned work on it in Naples in April 1832, the last entry ending in the middle of a sentence.

== Critical reception ==
From the time of the Journal's first publication extraordinary claims have been made for it. In 1891 Algernon Swinburne wrote that "The too long delayed publication of his Journal is in every way an almost priceless benefit; but as a final illustration and attestation of a character almost incomparably lovable, admirable, and noble, it is a gift altogether beyond price." The biographer Hesketh Pearson thought it "Perhaps the most valuable, certainly the most moving, of all his productions; and, since it displays a man whose goodness of heart balanced his greatness of mind, incomparably the most interesting work of its kind ever written." The novelist Hugh Walpole called it "that masterpiece of human nature". For Virginia Woolf, "Scott's Journals are the best life of Scott in existence...they contain Scott in his glory and Scott in his gloom...in a few passages Scott throws more light upon his genius and its limitations than all his critics in their innumerable volumes". The Scott scholar David Hewitt agreed, writing that "There is no greater or more moving diary in English"; however he also made the point that its fine artistic shape cannot be credited to Scott, since he quite fortuitously took up the Journal as the tragedy of his last years was about to begin. The literary historian Oliver Elton believed that the Journal's high place in English literature was secure: "Whatever else of Scott's may lose its colour with time, the Journal cannot do so, with its accurate, unexaggerated language of pain."

Lockhart believed that Scott knew his Journal would eventually be published, but he nevertheless called it "The most candid Diary that ever man penned". The theme of the Journal's candour has been taken up by many later critics. C. S. Lewis considered that it was "One of the sincerest books in the world, and (what is not exactly the same thing) full of self-knowledge." The novelist John Buchan wrote that "It is one of the most complete expressions of a human soul that we possess… There is no reticence and no posturing, because he is speaking to his own soul…The greatest figure he ever drew is in the Journal, and it is the man Walter Scott." W. E. K. Anderson added the other side of the coin: "It is candid about Scott himself. It is neither informative nor candid about other people." The novelist and critic A. N. Wilson judged it to be a truthful record of an unusual kind:

There is nothing in it which can be contradicted by other biographical evidence…Yet there is something extremely conscious about it. It is far more than a work of art. Scott was not making himself out to be someone that he was not; rather, the Journal is his record of how he made himself conform to the heroic standards of his own fictions…Scott was intent on facing [his difficulties and sorrows] with the bravado of Burley and the stubbornness of Jeanie Deans.

John Sutherland offered a dissenting view of the Journal's sincerity. He thought that Scott, foreseeing eventual publication, took the opportunity to influence history's view of his financial crisis: "In these appallingly humiliating circumstances it evidently became more important than ever that he should preserve a noble image of himself in extremis for posterity."

== Editions ==
- John Gibson Lockhart Memoirs of the Life of Sir Walter Scott. in 7 volumes (Edinburgh: Robert Cadell, 1837). The last two volumes include substantial extracts from the Journal, the text being based on a transcript by Lockhart's wife Sophia, Scott's daughter. Many subsequent editions of Lockhart's biography have appeared.
- David Douglas (ed.) The Journal of Sir Walter Scott in 2 volumes (Edinburgh: David Douglas, 1890). The task of establishing the text was left to Professor Hume Brown. A revised edition in 1927 expands the notes.
- John Guthrie Tait and W. M. Parker (eds.) The Journal of Sir Walter Scott in 3 volumes (Edinburgh: Oliver and Boyd, 1939-1946). The text was produced by collating the Douglas edition against a photocopy, held in the National Library of Scotland, of the original manuscript.
- W. E. K. Anderson (ed.) The Journal of Sir Walter Scott (Oxford: Clarendon Press, 1972). This was reissued as a paperback by Canongate Classics in 1998, with minor corrections and additions. Anderson’s edition is amply annotated, but like the previous one was based on a photocopy.
- David Hewitt (ed.) Scott on Himself (Edinburgh: Scottish Academic Press, 1981). Includes extracts from the Journal comprising most of the entries from December 1825 to May 1826, edited from the original manuscript.
