= Queen's Hotel =

Queen's Hotel or The Queen's Hotel may refer to:

== Australia ==
- Queen's Hotel, Townsville

== Canada ==
- Queen's Hotel, Toronto

== Sri Lanka ==
- Queen's Hotel, Kandy

== United Kingdom ==
- Queen's Hotel, Aberystwyth, now known as Swyddfa'r Sir
- The Queens, Crouch End, London, formerly The Queen's Hotel
- Queen's Hotel, Primrose Hill, London
- Queen's Hotel, Gibraltar
- Queen's Hotel, Kirn
- Queens Hotel, Leeds
- Queens Hotel, Southsea
- The Queen's Hotel, Queen's Promenade, Douglas, Isle of Man, one of Isle of Man's Registered Buildings

== See also ==
- Queen Hotel
