= Reginald Dalton =

1823 novel

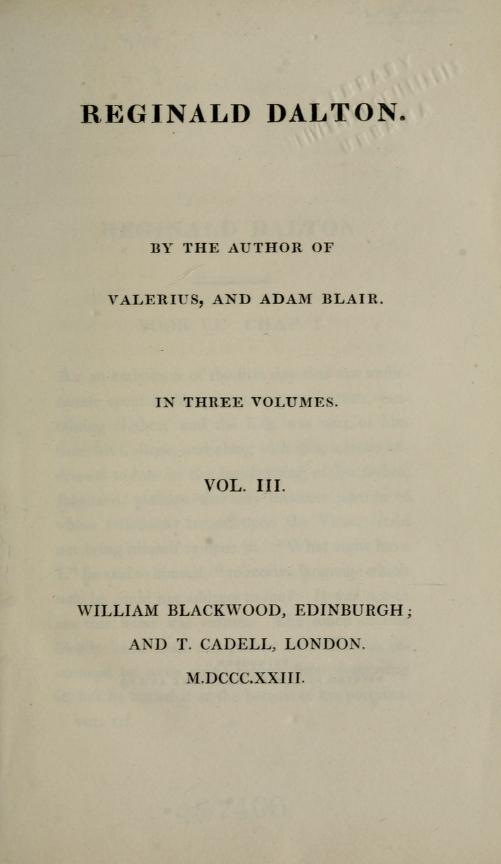
- Author: John Gibson Lockhart
- Language: English
- Genre: Comedy
- Publisher: William Blackwood
- Publication date: 1823
- Publication place: United Kingdom
- Media type: Print

Reginald Dalton is an 1823 comedy novel by the Scottish writer John Gibson Lockhart originally published in three volumes by William Blackwood in Edinburgh and Thomas Cadell in London. It was one of four novels Lockhart published in the early 1820s, including Valerius (1821) and Adam Blair (1822). It takes place around Oxford University which Lockhart had himself attended. It helped to launch the genre of "Oxford novels" which focus on the development of a young student.

== Synopsis ==
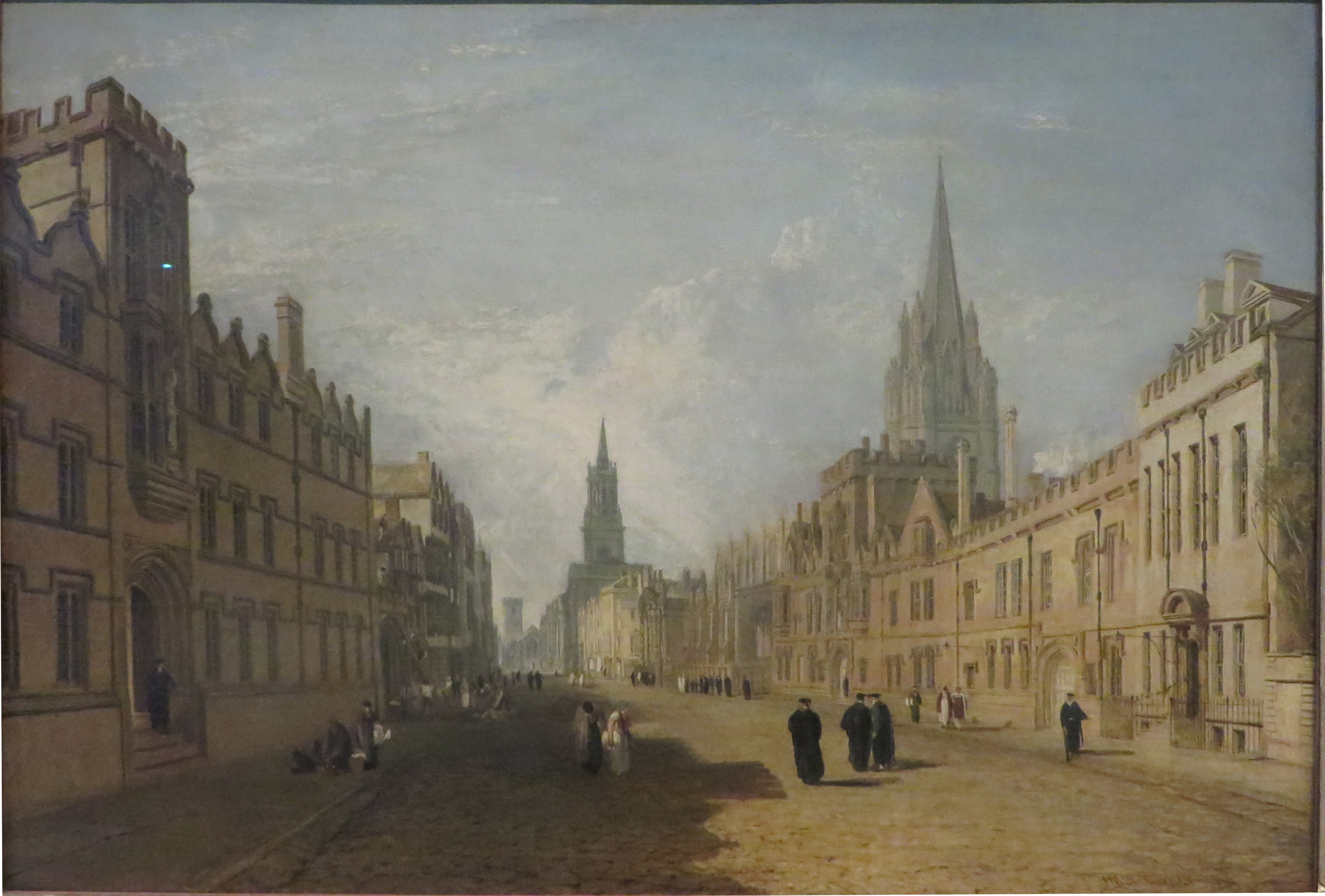
Oxford High Street by Turner.

Reginald Dalton, a naïve young vicar's son, arrives at Oxford to study but soon falls in with a bad crowd and runs into debt. His father can scarcely afford to support him and he becomes a servitor, leading to snobbish mockery and exclusion from those who had once been his friends. He ends up fighting a duel.

== Bibliography ==
- Bevan, David. University Fiction. Rodopi, 1990.
- Brock, Michael G. & Curthoys, Mark C. Nineteenth-century Oxford, Part 1. Clarendon Press, 1997
- Dougill, John. Oxford in English Literature: The Making, and Undoing, of 'the English Athens'. University of Michigan Press, 1998.
