= Bizarro (novel) =

Unfinished 1832 novel by Sir Walter Scott

- 2008 Edinburgh University Press cover
- Author: Sir Walter Scott
- Cover artist: Sir Henry Raeburn
- Language: English
- Series: Waverley Novels
- Genre: Picaresque novel
- Publisher: Edinburgh University Press, Columbia University Press
- Publication date: 25 June 2008
- Publication place: United Kingdom
- Media type: Print (hardback) and CD-ROM
- Pages: 30
- ISBN: 0748624872
- Preceded by: The 2 Drovers
- Followed by: Saint Ronan's Well

Bizarro is an unfinished novel or novella by Sir Walter Scott written in the spring of 1832 but not published until 2008. Scott came across the story of the brigand Francesco Moscato, known as "Il Bizarro" in the early nineteenth century, while he was travelling in Italy, trying to recoup his ruined health. It was told to him as true by an English apothecary, resident in Italy, whom Scott considered "a respectable authority".

== The original story ==
The story that Scott heard, and jotted down in his journal, concerns a Calabrian bandit-leader, who is hard pressed by a French military force sent to capture him. At one point, while alone except for his wife and infant son, he is in imminent danger of capture, and is forced to strangle his son to prevent his crying from giving them away. His wife cannot forgive him for this crime, and takes her revenge in the middle of the night by shooting the sleeping bandit, cutting off his head, and taking it to the authorities to claim the price set on it. The members of Il Bizarro's gang then give themselves up. Scott finally goes back to mention one of Il Bizarro's former atrocities, in which he murdered a French officer by having him eaten by insects.

== Manuscript and publication history ==
Drawing on this narrative, and on some pamphlets dealing with Italian brigands, Scott did his best to produce a publishable story, but his death later in the year left the manuscript of the still uncompleted Bizarro, and another novel called The Siege of Malta, in the hands of his son-in-law and literary executor J. G. Lockhart. Lockhart did not consider either work good enough for publication, but in his biography of Scott he included the synopsis of Il Bizarro's adventures recorded in Scott's journal. Lockhart's poor opinion of both novels was shared by John Buchan, who in 1932 said he "hoped that no literary resurrectionist will ever be guilty of the crime of giving them to the world." In 2008 Bizarro was finally published, together with The Siege of Malta, in an edition by J. H. Alexander, Judy King, and Graham Tulloch, published by Edinburgh University Press and Columbia University Press. This edition presents a literal transcript of the manuscript together with a reading text in which the more obvious errors are corrected. It also includes a CD-ROM scan of the manuscript.
