= Matthew Wald =

1824 novel

- Author: John Gibson Lockhart
- Language: English
- Publisher: William Blackwood
- Publication date: 1824
- Publication place: United Kingdom
- Media type: Print

The History of Matthew Wald is an 1824 novel by the Scottish writer John Gibson Lockhart originally published by William Blackwood. It was the fourth and last novel written by Lockhart, the son-in-law of Walter Scott. The novel is partly set in a lunatic asylum. It was influenced by the writings of William Godwin and resembles Justified Sinner by James Hogg, published the same year.

== Bibliography ==
- Baugh, Albert C (ed.) A Literary History of England Vol. 4. Routledge, 2004.
- Brown, Ian (ed.) Edinburgh History of Scottish Literature: Enlightenment, Britain and Empire (1707-1918). Edinburgh University Press, 2006.
- Carruthers, Gerard (ed.) A Companion to Scottish Literature. John Wiley & Sons, 2023.
