= Walter Scott's letters =

The letters of Sir Walter Scott, the novelist and poet, range in date from September 1788, when he was aged 17, to June 1832, a few weeks before his death. (Note: Four undated letters to an unknown young woman addressed as "Jessie", assigned to 1787 in H. J. C. Grierson's edition, are now known to have been written no earlier than 1792.) About 7000 letters from Scott are known, and about 6500 letters addressed to him. The major repository of both is the National Library of Scotland. H. J. C. Grierson's The Letters of Sir Walter Scott (1932–1937), though it includes only about 3500, remains the standard edition.

== Scott as a letter-writer ==
Scott's letters do not read like literary documents intended one day to be published, but like spontaneous and unstudied expressions of Scott's thoughts; writing to his future wife Scott himself admitted that "I never read my letters a second time". His intention seems to have been simply to entertain his correspondent, and the result can sometimes be genuinely witty. He does not write about his novels or his business concerns, since he had chosen to keep his involvement in both confidential, nor on the whole about his private feelings, though letters to his closest friends can sometimes be revelatory of his inner life, disclosing sharply contrasting aspects of his personality depending on the character of his correspondent. Even then they can be misleading as autobiographical documents, for as Scott himself wrote, "letters...exhibit the writers less as they really are, than as they desire their friends should believe them to be."

== Correspondents ==
Scott had a wide range of correspondents, reflecting his diverse literary and business interests and his close family life. They include writers, artists, scientists, and the great political figures of his day. Figures to whom he wrote most often include his wife, Margaret Charlotte Scott; his sons Walter and Charles Scott; his son-in-law John Gibson Lockhart; his sister-in-law Elizabeth McCulloch Scott; his steward William Laidlaw; his clan chief Charles Scott, Duke of Buccleuch; society figures Anne Hamilton, Marchioness of Abercorn and Henry James Montagu-Scott, Lord Montagu; the politicians John Wilson Croker and J. B. S. Morritt; the lawyers Charles Erskine, John Gibson, John Richardson, and James Skene; the printer James Ballantyne; the publishers John Ballantyne, Robert Cadell, Archibald Constable, and John Murray; the poets Joanna Baillie, George Ellis, and Margaret Douglas-Maclean-Clephane, Marchioness of Northampton; the novelist Maria Edgeworth; the antiquaries Richard Heber, David Laing, and Charles Kirkpatrick Sharpe; and the actor Daniel Terry.

== Manuscripts ==
Some 7000 letters from Scott are known to survive, widely scattered across the world. About half of them are now in the National Library of Scotland; other institutions with large holdings include National Records of Scotland, Edinburgh University Library, the Beinecke Library, the Fales Library, and the Morgan Library & Museum. Over 450 letters are known to be in private hands.

There are also over 6500 surviving letters addressed to Scott. About 6000 of them were collected together by Scott himself and bound into letter-books; these were kept at Abbotsford by his descendants until 1921, when they were sold by auction to the novelist Hugh Walpole. Walpole bequeathed them to the National Library of Scotland, where the 46 volumes, commonly known as the Walpole collection, are officially designated NLS MSS 3874–3919.

== Publication history ==
The seven-volume Memoirs of the Life of Sir Walter Scott (1837–1838), by John Gibson Lockhart, includes a large number of Scott's letters. More appeared in various publications later in the 19th century, in particular David Douglas's attractive two-volume Familiar Letters of Sir Walter Scott (1894), though Douglas's editorial practices, like Lockhart's, do not meet modern standards. Selections from the Walpole collection of letters received by Scott were published in Wilfred Partington's The Private Letter-Books of Sir Walter Scott (1930) and Sir Walter Scott's Post-Bag (1932). From 1932 to 1937 H. J. C. Grierson produced his twelve-volume Letters of Sir Walter Scott, which put some 3500 letters into print, about half the number now known to exist. This edition has never been superseded, and is now available online. There is also a comprehensive online catalogue of all Scott's outgoing and incoming letters, which is published by the National Library of Scotland.

== Sources ==
- Anonymous (13 December 2005). "The Letters of Sir Walter Scott: E-Text". The Walter Scott Digital Archive. Edinburgh University Library.
- Anonymous (2018a). "Home page". Millgate Union Catalogue of Walter Scott Correspondence. National Library of Scotland.
- Anonymous (2018b). "Introduction: Scott and his letters". Millgate Union Catalogue of Walter Scott Correspondence. National Library of Scotland.
- Bell, Alan (1973). "Scott manuscripts in Edinburgh libraries". In Bell, Alan (ed.). Scott Bicentenary Essays: Selected Papers Read at the Sir Walter Scott Bicentenary Conference. Edinburgh: Scottish Academic Press. pp. 147–159. ISBN 070111987X.
- Grierson, H. J. C., ed. (1932). The Letters of Sir Walter Scott 1787–1807. London: Constable.
- Hewitt, David, ed. (1981). Scott on Himself: A Selection of the Autobiographical Writings of Sir Walter Scott. Edinburgh: Scottish Academic Press. ISBN 0707302838.
