= Adam Blair (novel) =

1822 novel by John Gibson Lockhart

- Author: John Gibson Lockhart
- Language: English
- Publisher: William Blackwood
- Publication date: 1822
- Publication place: United Kingdom
- Media type: Print

Adam Blair is an 1822 novel by the Scottish writer John Gibson Lockhart. Lockhart, the son-in-law and biographer of Walter Scott, produced four novels in the early 1820s. In this a Church of Scotland minister is accused of adultery. Lockhart's biographer Andrew Lang praised the novel, comparing its theme to the later 1850 novel The Scarlet Letter by Nathaniel Hawthorne, as did Henry James. Its full title is Some Passages in the Life of Mr Adam Blair.

== Bibliography ==
- Carruthers, Gerard (ed.) A Companion to Scottish Literature. John Wiley & Sons, 2023.
- Hubbard, Tom. The Selected Writings of Andrew Lang. Taylor & Francis, 2017.
- Long, Robert Emmet. The Great Succession: Henry James and the Legacy of Hawthorne. University of Pittsburgh Press, 1979
- McCall, Dan. Citizens of Somewhere Else: Nathaniel Hawthorne and Henry James. Cornell University Press, 1999.
