= Cockney School =

Group of 19th-century English poets and essayists

The "Cockney School" refers to a group of poets and essayists writing in England in the second and third decades of the 19th century. The term came in the form of hostile reviews in Blackwood's Magazine in 1817. Its primary target was Leigh Hunt, but John Keats and William Hazlitt were also included. Only Keats could properly be regarded as a cockney. Hazlitt was not even born in London. John Scott died after a duel over the controversy.

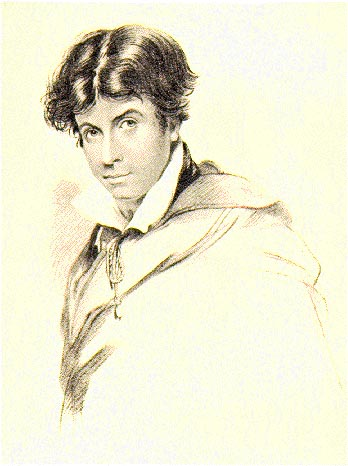
Leigh Hunt the supposed chief offender of the "Cockney School."

Each of the writers was derided for a slightly different quality. Keats, for example, was accused of "low diction" for rhyming "thorns/fawns" in "Sleep and Poetry" and other rhymes which suggested a working class speech. Hunt and Hazlitt were similarly vilified for their diction, but the criticisms were more ideological with them than with Keats. John Wilson Croker perpetuated the term "Cockney School" beyond the pages of Blackwood's in 1818 when he attacked Keats's Endymion in the Quarterly Review. John Wilson (Christopher North) and John Gibson Lockhart had joined its staff in 1817. Lockhart shared in the caustic and aggressive articles that marked the early years of Blackwood, but his biographer Andrew Lang denied he was responsible for the virulent articles on Samuel Taylor Coleridge and on "The Cockney School of Poetry" of Leigh Hunt, Keats and their friends. Lockhart has been accused of the later Blackwood article (August 1818) on Keats, but he did show appreciation of Coleridge and Wordsworth.[4]

== Background ==
The term, and the campaign against Hunt and the others, was not a question of aesthetics. It was, instead, an attack on the class background of the authors and their aspirations to the highest level of the literati, and it was, additionally, a reaction to the "Cockney" politics of the authors. The political, reformist agenda and the democratic ideology of Hunt and Hazlitt were offensive to the Blackwood's review staff, and the cultural and class background of the authors was introduced as a mechanism. Percy Bysshe Shelley was accused of being similarly offensive politically, but the reviewers excused him for his genius (and, of course, his high birth).

The second generation of the Romantic movement was as politically and economically revolutionary as it was aesthetically challenging to the status quo, and the controversy and partial reviewers responsible for the creation of the "Cockney School" epithet foreground how offensive it was to the establishment that lower class persons might emerge. According to the 1907 Nuttall's Brief Encyclopedia, the term was revived in the 1890s by working class London poets, but, although this may have been en vogue at the turn of the twentieth century, the term is currently remembered for the Romantic reference only.
