= Queen Hotel =

Queen Hotel is the name of:

- Queen Hotel, Chester, a hotel in England
- Queen Hotel, Harrogate, former name of a hotel in England

== See also ==
- Queen's Hotel
