= Regent's Park Road =

Street in London, England

Coordinates: 51.54006°N 0.15744°W

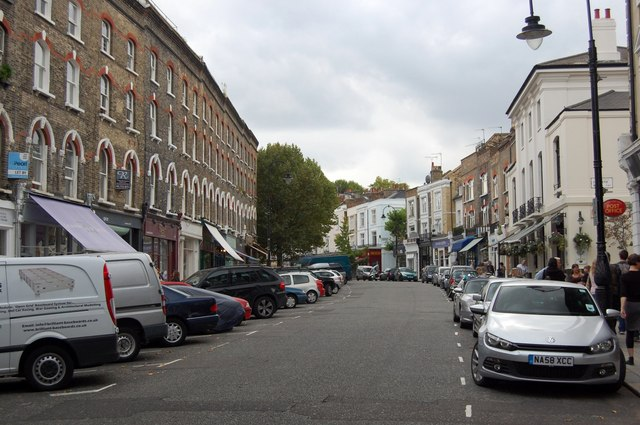
The shops forming the centre of the Primrose Hill area.

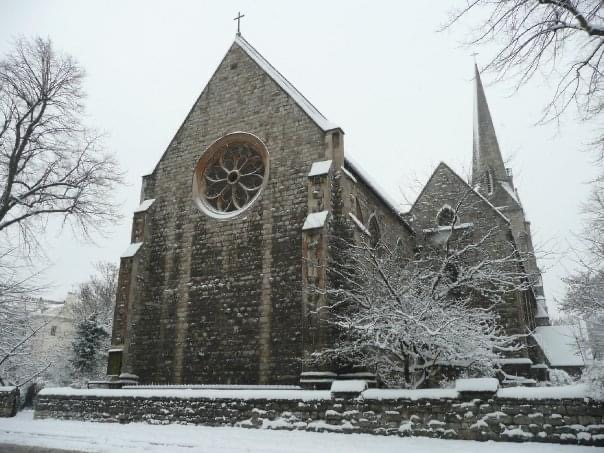
St Mark's Church seen from Regent's Park Road.

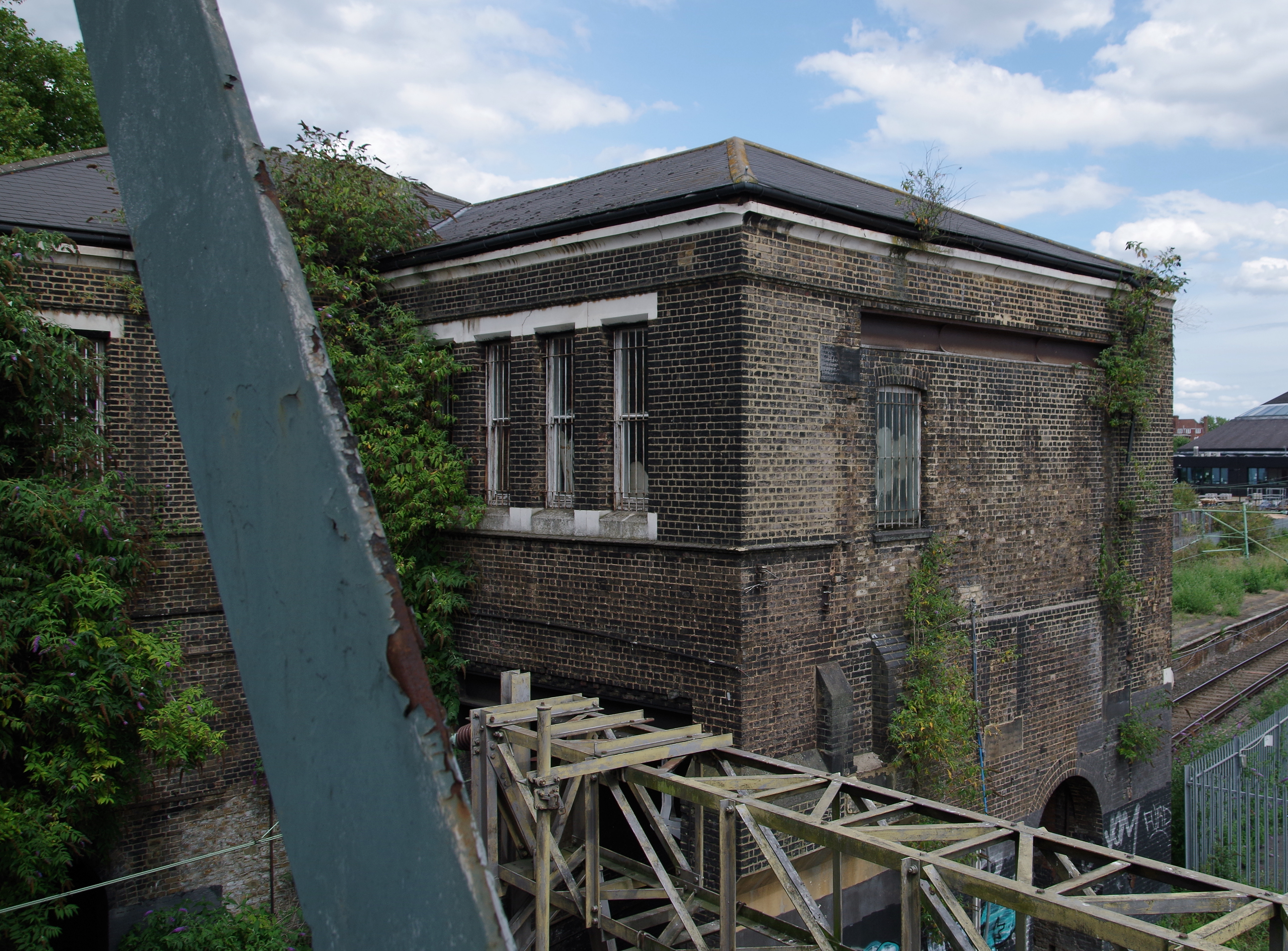
The building of the now closed Primrose Hill railway station.

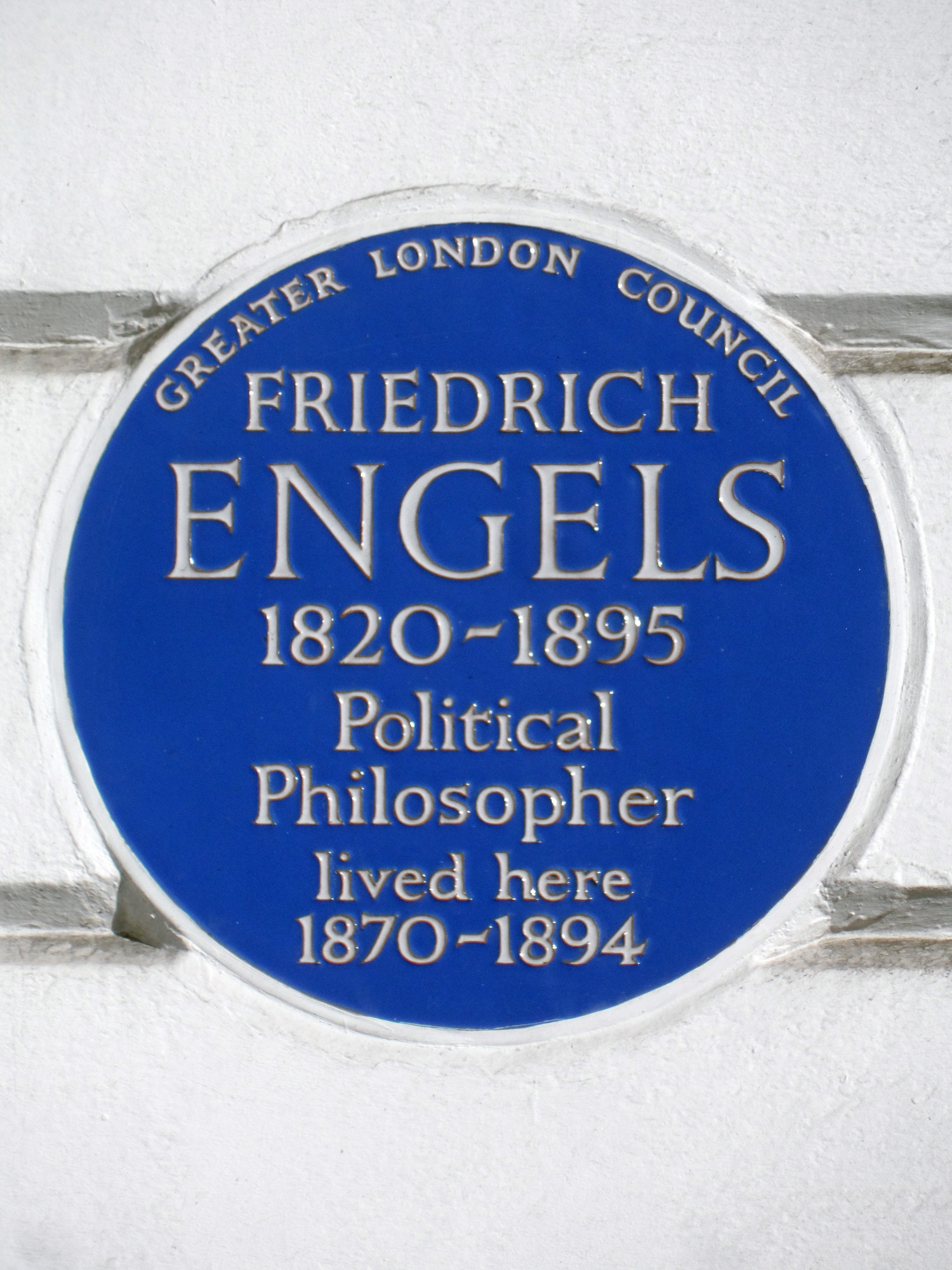
Blue plaque for Friedrich Engels.

Regent's Park Road is a street in the Primrose Hill area of London, England. Located in the London Borough of Camden, it runs in a curving crescent shape. For some of its route it follows alongside the eastern edge of Primrose Hill park and also includes the commercial centre of the area. Despite its name the street does not run as far as Regent's Park although the adjacent Prince Albert Road does.

It diverges from Gloucester Avenue at Cecil Sharp House and heads westwards until it meets Primrose Hill. It runs adjacent to the park and then at the northern end the previously residential buildings give way to shops, restaurants and a pub, the Queen's Hotel, as the road curves eastwards. Primrose Hill Road leads off it to head north to Belsize Park. Regent's Park Road again meets Gloucester Avenue by the Pembroke Castle pub and then continues over a bridge across the West Coast Main Line until it finishes at the junction with Haverstock Hill between Chalk Farm tube station and the Roundhouse. The bridge that carries the street across the West Coast Main Line is now pedestrianised. It was the location of the former Primrose Hill railway station, once an important commuter station on the North London Railway, which closed in 1992.

The northern part of the street dates back to at least the eighteenth century and was known as Primrose Vale. Like the rest of the area it was laid out as a residential area in nineteenth century, with many of the original buildings surviving. There had been an older Chalk Farm Tavern on what is now the street, which was famous as a site of dueling in eighteenth century and Regency London, but was rebuilt in the Victorian era. The stretch of street south of the Queen's Hotel was originally known as Queen's Street, but later the whole road adopted the same name. The Anglican St Mark's Church was opened in 1852, and then rebuilt following German bombing in the Second World War.

The German socialist theorist Friedrich Engels lived in the street from 1870 to 1894 and is now commemorated with a blue plaque. Kingsley Amis lived in the street from 1984 onwards. The pianist and teacher James Gibb lived in a flat at No 10 from 1956 until his death in 2013, aged 95.

== Bibliography ==
- Bebbington, Gillian. London Street Names. Batsford, 1972.
- Bradford, Richard. Lucky Him: The Life of Kingsley Amis. Peter Owen, 2000.
- Cockburn, J. S., King, H. P. F. & McDonnell, K. G. T. & A History of the County of Middlesex. Institute of Historical Research, 1989.
- Cherry, Bridget & Pevsner, Nikolaus. London 3: North West. Yale University Press, 2002.
