= The Siege of Malta (novel) =

Posthumous novel by Sir Walter Scott

- First edition cover (2008)
- Author: Sir Walter Scott
- Cover artist: Sir Henry Raeburn
- Language: English
- Series: Waverley Novels
- Genre: Historical novel
- Publisher: Edinburgh University Press, Columbia University Press
- Publication date: 25 June 2008
- Publication place: United Kingdom
- Media type: Print (hardback) and CD-ROM
- Pages: 158
- ISBN: 0748624872
- Preceded by: The Monastery
- Followed by: The Abbot

The Siege of Malta is a historical novel by Walter Scott written from 1831 to 1832 and first published posthumously in 2008. It tells the story of events surrounding the Great Siege of Malta by the Ottoman Turks in 1565.

== Synopsis ==
An official of the Order of the Knights of St. John arrives in Spain to summon one of their Knights Commander, Don Manuel de Vilheyna, to Malta, the headquarters of the Order, which is threatened by the Turks. He returns to Malta with Vilheyna's nephew, Francisco, and a Servant-at-Arms of the Order, Juan Ramegas. Vilheyna's niece, Angelica, secretly in love with Francisco, is left to pine for him. Vilheyna himself visits the king of Spain to ask for his support in the Order's cause, then follows the others to Malta. He is involved in a naval skirmish with the Turks, who are now attacking the island, but makes harbour and is welcomed by the Grand Master of the Order, Jean Parisot de Valette.

The scene shifts to the enemy camp where we see Mustapha and Piali, the commanders of the Turkish army and navy respectively, each scheming to gain an advantage over the other. On the Maltese side a full Council of the Order considers strategies for the defence of the island. News arrives that Vilheyna's old enemy, Dragut, has arrived in command of a force of Algerian and Tunisian corsairs. Renewed Turkish attacks are repulsed, partly as a result of Ramegas' exploit in destroying a new secret weapon of the Turks, a giant elevating cannon.

From this point on all of the original Spanish characters, apart from Ramegas, are silently dropped from the story, and Scott begins to turn his novel into a simple military chronicle of the siege. The Turkish armies, reinforced by Dragut's corsairs, launch an amphibious attack, which is again thrown back. Dragut dies of wounds received in battle, Mustapha's attempts to break through are frustrated, and he eventually abandons the siege. The Knights are joined by fresh forces from Sicily, and the remaining Turks are defeated. The novel ends with the prospect of a new Malta rising from the rubble of the old as work begins on the building and fortification of the city of Valletta.

== Composition ==
Walter Scott's last years were blighted firstly by a series of strokes which greatly impaired his physical and mental powers, and secondly by enormous debts, which he attempted to pay off by writing novels with all the exertion and diligence he could still muster. In October 1831, he set sail for the Mediterranean in an attempt to recover his health, and, after spending three weeks in Malta, went on to Naples.

On 24 October 1831, shortly before leaving England, Scott mentioned in a letter to his publisher that he proposed to write a novel, at that stage called The Knight of Malta. His main source for this project was the Abbé de Vertot's History of the Knights of Malta, a book which he had read as a boy, and which he took with him on the voyage.

Progress, as usual with Scott, was rapid. Writing several hours every morning, he was after two months able to report that a quarter of it had been written, and on 26 January 1832, he claimed it was nearly done. On 6 March 1832, he wrote to confess that he had burned half of it by mistake, but he rewrote the destroyed section in a manner that pleased him better than the original version. Scott was well pleased with his work, predicting that it would be far superior to his two previous novels, and altogether one of the best he had ever written.

By the middle of April 1832, the novel was finished, and the manuscript was dispatched to his publisher Robert Cadell.

== Manuscripts and publication history ==
Scott's manuscript consists of 150 quarto sheets, with numerous insets giving corrections and additions, written in the appalling handwriting common to all the works Scott wrote in his final period of bad health. The novel amounts to about 77,000 words.

No steps were taken to publish the novel during the few months that remained of Scott's life, and J. G. Lockhart, Scott's son-in-law and literary executor, expressed his hope that The Siege of Malta would never see the light of day, since it was of such poor quality that it could only harm Scott's reputation. The manuscript was kept by Scott's descendants at Abbotsford, and several pages of it were given away to souvenir-hunters. A highly unreliable copy was made in 1878, which, with all its faults, can be used to fill up most of these gaps, and a typescript copy of the 1878 copy was made in 1932 by a Maltese journalist.

According to his 1906 biography, Sir Walter Scott, Andrew Lang had been told that "many passages are full of the old spirit".

In 1928, an anonymous contributor to The Scotsman pressed for publication to be considered, and the following year the Scott scholar Sir Herbert Grierson read The Siege of Malta with that end in view, but in the event he advised a publisher against bringing it out.

In 1932, another biographer of Scott, John Buchan, expressed the hope that "no literary resurrectionist will ever be guilty of the crime of giving [it] to the world". Some years later a minor English novelist, S. Fowler Wright, also read the manuscript or one of its copies, and then published his own Siege of Malta, which he claimed was "Based on an unfinished romance by Sir Walter Scott". This novel was published in 1942 when, coincidentally Malta was going through another siege, this time during World War II.

In 1977, it at last became possible for the reading public to form an accurate idea of the novel's plot and style when Donald E. Sultana published his The Siege of Malta Rediscovered, a biographical account of the writing of the novel together with an extended abstract of its plot and a large number of lengthy quotations from it. A reliable typewritten transcript of the novel was also made by Jane Millgate and deposited in the New York Public Library.

In 2008, the entire novel was finally published, together with Bizarro, another of Scott's suppressed stories, in an edition by J. H. Alexander, Judy King, and Graham Tulloch, published by Edinburgh University Press and Columbia University Press. This edition presents a literal transcript of the manuscripts together with a reading text in which the more obvious errors are corrected. It also includes a CD-ROM scan of the manuscript.

== Critical reception of the Edinburgh edition ==
The editors of Bizarro and The Siege of Malta have described them as "unique and moving texts by a master of resonant storytelling", but other assessments have been less enthusiastic. Stuart Kelly, literary editor of the newspaper Scotland on Sunday, called them "the ghost of genius wandering once its soul has left". The author Paul Scott said of The Siege of Malta that "It starts off as a very intelligent, very well written and interesting piece of work, but as it gets towards the end of his life, it begins to fall apart. There was no doubt that his mind weakened and his writing suffered as a result of this." Scott's biographer John Sutherland made his point more bluntly when he told a journalist, "Most of it is incredibly chaotic. It does indicate a very wonderful mind, completely buggered up by explosions in the head."
