= John Scott (editor) =

Scottish journalist (1784-1821)

John Scott (24 October 1784 – 27 February 1821) was a Scottish journalist, editor and publisher.

Scott edited several liberal newspapers: The Statesman, which Leigh Hunt founded; the Stamford News, published by John Drakard; Drakard's Paper (a London edition of this), which he renamed The Champion; and the most notable, the London Magazine, which he revived, as a monthly, in January 1820.

Under his direction, the magazine included works by Wordsworth, Charles Lamb, de Quincey, John Clare, Thomas Hood, Carlyle, Keats, Leigh Hunt, and Hazlitt. He also agreed to write a third of the magazine himself, which he did mostly under pseudonyms.

He attended Aberdeen Grammar School, as did Lord Byron, who was some years younger; he spent 1795-8 at Marischal College, but left without graduating. When Byron published an account of his marriage in 1816, Scott called this publication indelicacy; Leigh Hunt quarreled with him over this.

Scott was author of A Visit To Paris In 1814, followed by Paris Revisited, in 1815, By Way Of Brussels which included an account of walking over the battlefield of Waterloo.

He died as the result of a duel, one of the side effects of the Cockney School controversy. John Gibson Lockhart had been abusing many of Scott's contributors in Blackwood's Magazine (under a pseudonym (Z), as was then common). In May 1820, Scott began a series of counter-articles, which provoked Lockhart into calling him "a liar and a scoundrel". In February 1820, Lockhart's London agent, Jonathan Henry Christie, made a provocative statement, and Scott challenged him.

They met on 16 February 1821, close to the Chalk Farm Tavern between Camden Town and Hampstead. Christie did not fire in the first round, but there was a misunderstanding between the seconds, resulting in a second round. Scott was hit in the abdomen, was taken to the Tavern and died 10 days later. Christie and his second were tried for wilful murder and acquitted; the collection for Scott's family was a notable radical cause.
