= Valerius (novel) =

1821 novel

- Author: John Gibson Lockhart
- Language: English
- Publisher: William Blackwood
- Publication date: 1821
- Publication place: United Kingdom
- Media type: Print

Valerius is an 1821 historical novel in three volumes by the Scottish writer John Gibson Lockhart, the first of four that he wrote. Lockhart was the son-in-law of Walter Scott, and the work was seen as an attempt to imitate the style of his father-in-law's Waverley Novels. It is set in Ancient Rome, a historical period that Scott himself avoided writing about. Valerius, the hero, converts to Christianity and has to flee to Britain to escape the persecution of the Emperor Trajan.

== Bibliography ==
- Aquino, Frederick D. & King Benjamin J. The Oxford Handbook of John Henry Newman. Oxford University Press, 2018.
- Baugh, Albert C (ed.) A Literary History of England Vol. 4. Routledge, 2004.
- Vance, Norman & Wallace, Jennifer (ed.) The Oxford History of Classical Reception in English Literature, Volume 4. Oxford University Press, 2012.
