= Queen's Hotel, Primrose Hill =

Pub in London, England

Coordinates: 51.5405°N 0.1577°W

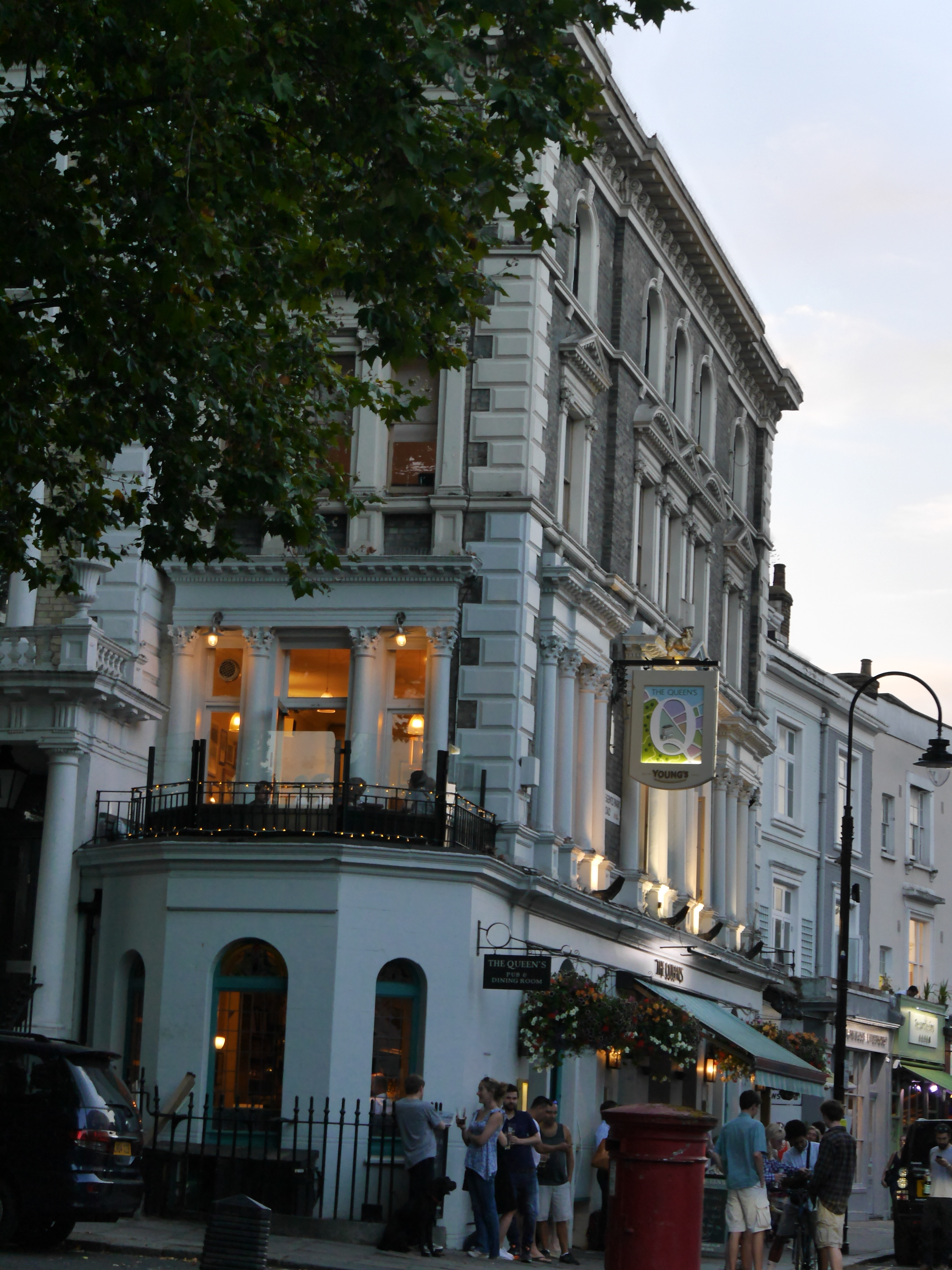
The Queen's, 2016

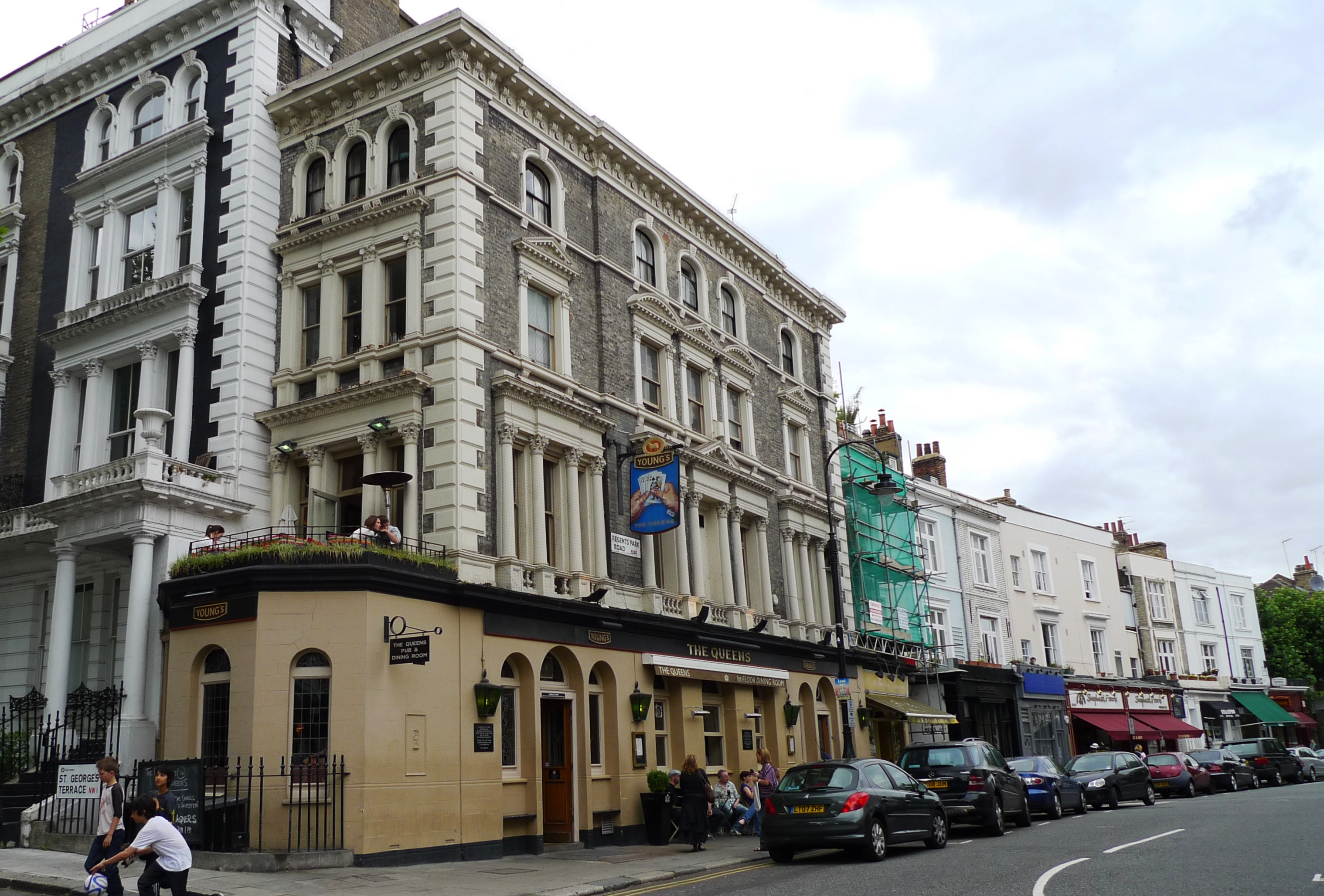
The Queen's, 2009

The Queen's is a pub and former hotel in Regent's Park Road, Primrose Hill, London.

It was built as a pub and hotel in 1855, and was still operating as a hotel at least as late as 1970. The pub sign had Queen Victoria on one side and a young Queen Alexandra on the other.

In 1996, it became a theme pub, with an African zoo motif, and some of its notable regular customers, Kingsley Amis, Robert Stephens and Peter Quennell, were said to be "horrified".

It is part of the Young's pub chain.
