= Chalk Farm Tavern =

Former public house in Primrose Hill, London

Coordinates: 51°32′30″N 0°09′25″W

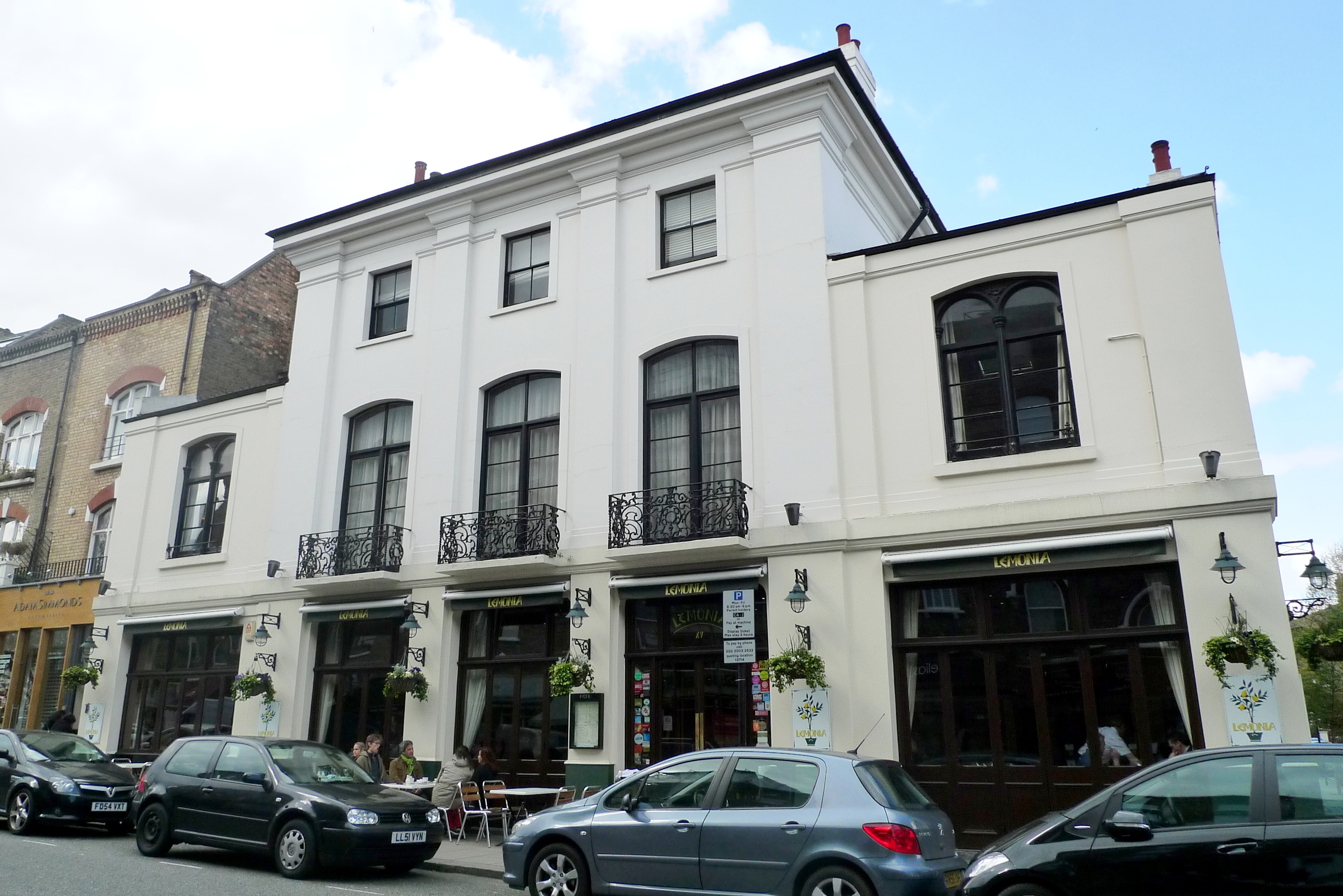
The former Chalk Farm Tavern.

The Chalk Farm Tavern was a public house located in what is today Regent's Park Road in Primrose Hill, London.

The first inn was located on Primrose Vale close to the historic Chalk Farm that gives its name to the area. It was a popular stop on the route for Londoners returning from a day out at Hampstead Wells on weekends and holidays. It had spacious rooms for entertainment as well as a pleasure garden. In 1837 a crowd of eight thousand was reported for a wrestling match.

The area became notorious for duelling during the Regency Era, as it was located, like Putney Heath, beyond the outskirts of the city. In 1806 the poet Thomas Moore and Francis Jeffrey met at Chalk Farm, but the authorities arrived to arrest both men before shots were fired. A famous duel took place on 16 February 1821, when John Scott, the editor of The London Magazine, was fatally wounded by the barrister and literary critic Jonathan Christie. Scott was carried back to the tavern, where he died nine days later. Christie was tried at the Old Bailey for murder but was acquitted.

Over the following decades the rural nature of the area disappeared, as it was increasingly built up by the Victorian era, served by the nearby North London Railway station. The street it stood on was renamed from Primrose Vale to Regent's Park Road. The tavern was rebuilt in 1854 on a smaller scale, allowing its gardens to be redeveloped and turned into new houses towards Chalcot Square. In the later twentieth century it was rebranded as a Lotus-themed bar before closing as a public house in the eighties. It subsequently became a Greek restaurant, Lemonia

== Bibliography ==
- Croinin, Richard. Paper Pellets: British Literary Culture After Waterloo. OUP Oxford, 2010.
- Cunningham, Hugh. Leisure in the Industrial Revolution: c. 1780-c.1880. Routledge, 2016.
- Darley, Peter. Camden Goods Station Through Time. Amberley Publishing, 2014.
- Hibbert, Christopher Weinreb, Ben, Keay, John & Keay, Julia. The London Encyclopaedia. Pan Macmillan, 2011.
- Walford, Edward. Old and new London: a narrative of its history, its people and its places, Volume 5. Cassell, 1978.
- Wheatley, Kim (ed.) Romantic Periodicals and Print Culture. Routledge, 2004.
