= Hans of Iceland =

1823 novel by Victor Hugo

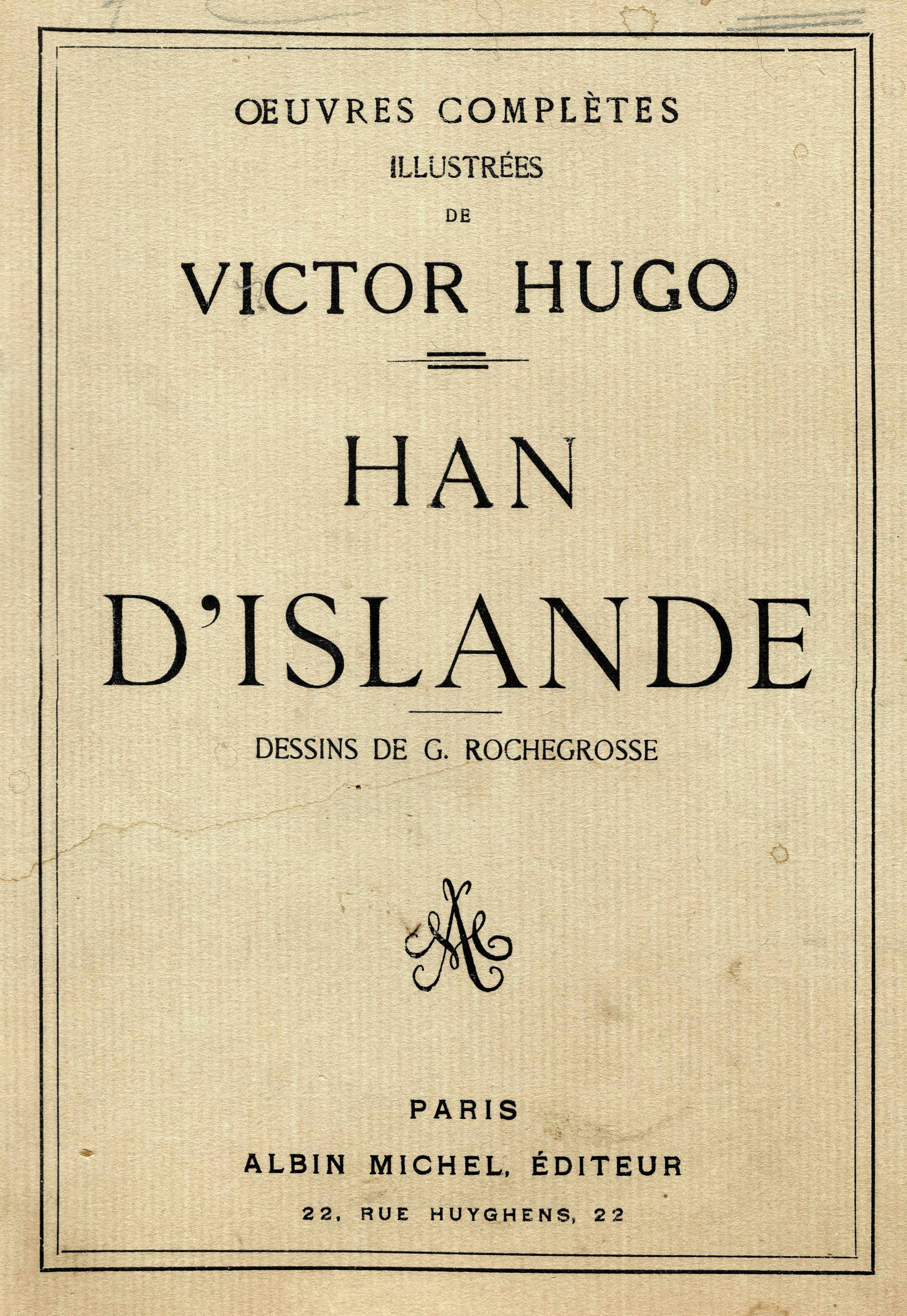
- Author: Victor Hugo
- Language: French
- Genre: Historical
- Publication date: 1823
- Publication place: France
- Media type: Print

Hans of Iceland (French: Han d'Islande) is an 1823 Gothic historical novel by the French writer Victor Hugo. It was revised from 1823 to 1833 from a shorter work that he had first published in the literary magazine Le Conservateur littéraire in 1820. It appeared in its first English translation in 1825.

== Plot summary ==
Hans of Iceland is located in the Trondheim region of Norway in 1699. Ordener Guldenlew, the protagonist, a virtuous, noble and courageous young man, is the son of the viceroy of Norway and lover of Ethel, gentle young daughter of Schumaker, former Count of Griffenfeld disgraced by the king and locked up in the fortress of Munkholmen.

Only certain papers, locked in an iron casket and in the hands of Hans of Iceland, could save Schumaker and his daughter. Ordener then sets off in search of him in the wild north of Norway.

Meanwhile, Hans of Iceland ravages the region, accompanied by his white bear, ferociously killing all those who stand in his path, pursuing with his hatred every member of the human species and in particular the arquebusiers of Munckholm, whose One killed his son Gill Stadt, whom he had by raping a young girl called Lucy Pelnych and to whom he wanted to transmit his hatred and violence.

Finally, the plot is coupled with dark and treacherous characters. Count Ahlefeld, whose daughter is promised to Ordener, plots to definitively crush his enemy Schumaker and ingratiate himself with the King of Denmark who controlled Norway at the time. Thus, through his secretary Musdoemon, who calls himself Hacket in his mission, he tries to raise the northern miners allied with the Montagnards, in the name of Schumaker, against royal tutelage (a sort of serfdom in Norway). The plot is then complex: Count Ahlefeld wishes to crush the miners' revolt, referring to Schumaker, to return to the King as the savior of royalty and accusing Schumaker of having fomented this revolt.

The book therefore relates the wandering of Ordener in search of Hans who constantly precedes him, the revolt of the miners, the plot of Ahlefeld and Musdoemon and the final outcome: the denunciation of the plot, the death sentence of Musdoemon, the dishonour of Ahlefeld, the restoration of Schumaker's titles, the marriage of the two young people, the death of Hans in a fire caused by himself.

== Bibliography ==
- Hogle, Jerrold E. The Undergrounds of the Phantom of the Opera: Sublimation and the Gothic in Leroux's Novel and its Progeny. Springer, 30 Apr 2016.
- Maxwell, Richard. The Historical Novel in Europe, 1650-1950. The Historical Novel in Europe, 1650–1950.
- Murray, Christopher John. Encyclopedia of the Romantic Era: 1760-1850. Routledge, 2013.
