= Queen's Hotel, Gibraltar =

Hotel in Gibraltar

Queen's Hotel
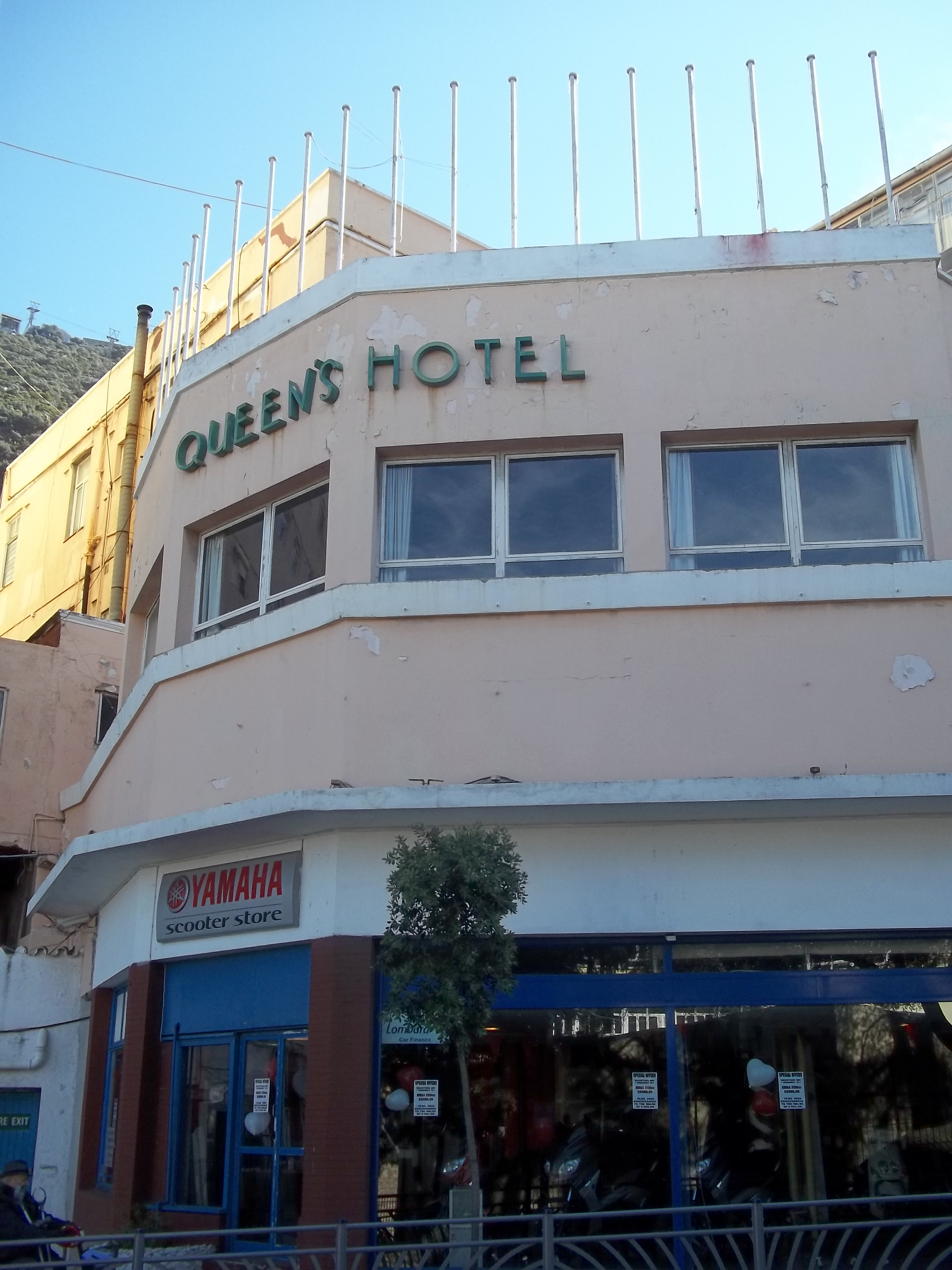
- The hotel in 2012

- Location within Gibraltar

General information
- Location: Gibraltar, Boyd Street
- Coordinates: 36°8′2″N 5°21′9″W

Website
- http://www.queenshotel.gi

The Queen's Hotel was a family run hotel in the British Overseas Territory of Gibraltar, located on 1 Boyd Street, between Trafalgar Cemetery and the Gibraltar Botanic Gardens. The hotel was established in 1954. It described itself as "Gibraltar's only budget hotel".
It was located near the Alameda Botanical Gardens and Gibraltar’s cable car both less than 100 metres away. The hotel had 62 rooms some with balcony and featured a restaurant with panoramic views across the bay. It offered a spacious bar and lounge area featuring wooden beamed ceilings and traditional brick archways.
It closed in June 2014 after being bought out by the Gibraltar Government to make way for the new Theatre Complex, which will include the Queen's Cinema.
