= Memoirs of the Life of Sir Walter Scott =

1837 biography by John Gibson Lockhart

- Author: John Gibson Lockhart
- Language: English
- Genre: Biography
- Publisher: Robert Cadell; John Murray
- Publication date: 1837–38
- Publication place: United Kingdom
- Media type: Print

Memoirs of the Life of Sir Walter Scott is a seven-volume biography by the British author John Gibson Lockhart. It charts the life of Lockhart's father-in-law the celebrated Scottish writer Sir Walter Scott, a major figure of the Romantic movement known for his Waverley novels. Scott, a prominent figure of the Regency era who had organised the Visit of George IV to Scotland, had died in 1832.

It was published in Edinburgh by Robert Cadell and London by John Murray, both publishing houses with close links to Scott. A second edition, consisting of ten volumes, was released in 1839. It was also published in United States where Scott's work was popular: in Boston by Otis, Broaders and Company and Philadelphia by Carey, Lea and Blanchard. Along with Thomas Moore's Life of Lord Byron it was one of the most influential literary biographies of the 1830s.

== Bibliography ==
- Beacham, Walton (ed.) Research Guide to Biography and Criticism: Volume 1. Research Publishing, 1985.
- Bradford, Richard (ed.) A Companion to Literary Biography. Wiley, 2018.
