= John Gibson Lockhart =

Scottish writer and editor (1794–1854)

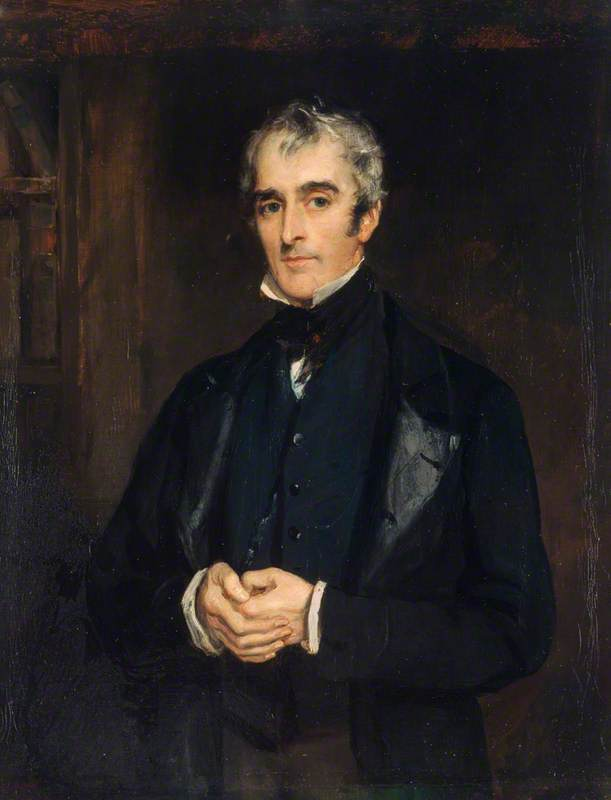
- Portrait of John Gibson Lockhart by Francis Grant, c. 1850
- Born: 12 June 1794; Cambusnethan House, Lanarkshire, Scotland
- Died: 25 November 1854 (aged 60); Abbotsford, Roxburghshire, Scotland
- Occupations: Writer; editor

John Gibson Lockhart (12 June 1794 – 25 November 1854) was a Scottish writer and editor. He is best known as the author of the seminal, and much-admired, seven-volume biography of his father-in-law Sir Walter Scott: Memoirs of the Life of Sir Walter Scott. He produced four novels in the early 1820s including Adam Blair and Reginald Dalton.

== Early years ==
Lockhart was born on 12 June 1794 in the manse of Cambusnethan House in Lanarkshire to Dr John Lockhart, who transferred in 1796 to Glasgow, and was appointed minister in the Presbyterian Church of Scotland, and his second wife Elizabeth Gibson (1767–1834), daughter of Margaret Mary Pringle and Reverend John Gibson, minister of St Cuthbert's, Edinburgh.

He was the younger paternal half-brother of the politician William Lockhart.

Lockhart attended Glasgow High School, where he showed himself clever rather than industrious. He fell into ill-health, and had to be removed from school before he was 12; but on his recovery he was sent at this early age to the University of Glasgow, and displayed so much precocious learning, especially in Greek, that he was offered a Snell exhibition at Oxford. He was not yet 14 when he entered Balliol College, Oxford, where he acquired a great store of knowledge outside the regular curriculum. He read French, Italian, German and Spanish, was interested in antiquities, and became versed in heraldic and genealogical lore.

== Blackwood's Magazine and a literary duel ==
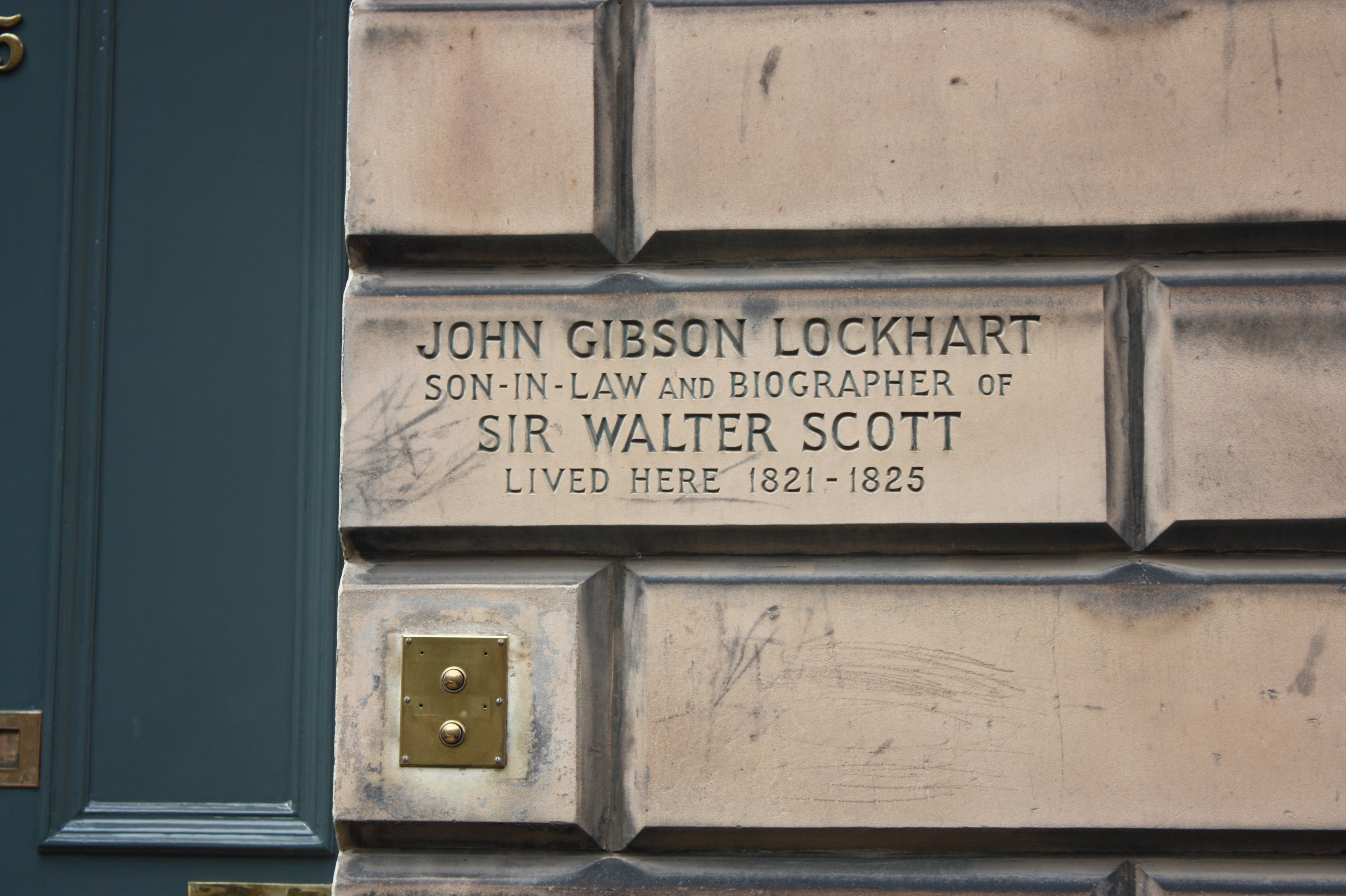
Plaque to John Gibson Lockhart at 25 Northumberland St, Edinburgh

In 1813, Lockhart took a first in classics then, for two years after leaving Oxford, lived in Glasgow before settling to the study of Scots law at the University of Edinburgh where, in 1816, he was elected to the Faculty of Advocates. A tour on the continent in 1817, when he visited Goethe at Weimar, was made possible when he was hired by the publisher William Blackwood to translate Friedrich Schlegel's Lectures on the History of Literature.

Edinburgh was then the stronghold of the Whig party, whose organ was the Edinburgh Review; and it was not until 1817 that the Scottish Tories found a means of expression in Blackwood's Magazine. After changing its name following a hum-drum launch as the Edinburgh Monthly Magazine, Blackwood's suddenly electrified Edinburgh with an outburst of brilliant criticism. Lockhart (along with John Wilson (Christopher North)), had joined its staff upon his return from Europe in 1817, and contributed to the caustic and aggressive articles that marked the early years of Blackwood's. Lockhart wrote virulent articles on "The Cockney School of Poetry" of Leigh Hunt, Keats and their contemporaries, although he did show appreciation of Coleridge and Wordsworth, and he praised Percy Bysshe Shelley, calling him "a man of genius".

One of the main literary organs of the Cockney School was The London Magazine. Its editor, John Scott, felt that Blackwood’s hounding of Keats had contributed to his 1821 death, at age 25. Scott also felt it was his duty to defend his authors against Lockhart and Blackwood’s. To that end, he published an attack of Lockhart and Blackwood’s; Lockhart promptly asked a London friend, Jonathan Henry Christie, to visit Scott and demand an apology. Scott refused; a series of letters were exchanged and the argument evolved into Scott’s insistence that Lockhart admit that he (Lockhart) was, in fact, the anonymous editor of Blackwood’s (it was common practice at the time to act an editor, and/or as a writer, anonymously, or using a pseudonym). According to the papers of Scott’s friend Peter George Patmore, who tried to negotiate a truce and kept a meticulous record of the matter, not only did Lockhart refuse to admit to his editorship, but he responded with "abusive epithets". With both men seeing their honour at stake, there was no going back and, on 16 February 1821, they proceeded with the duel near the Chalk Farm Tavern. But Lockhart did not attend; Jonathan Christie stepped into his place with his friend, James Traill, as his second. John Scott was wounded and died ten days later. Christie and Traill were tried for murder. They were acquitted, but Christie’s life was ruined. Lockhart was not blamed.

== Literary contributions ==
Between 1818 and 1825 Lockhart worked indefatigably. In 1819 Peter's Letters to his Kinsfolk appeared, and in 1822 he edited Peter Motteux's edition of Don Quixote, to which he prefixed a life of author Miguel de Cervantes. Four novels followed: Valerius in 1821, Adam Blair in 1822, Reginald Dalton in 1823 and Matthew Wald in 1824. However, his strength did not lie in novel writing. He also contributed to Blackwood translations of Spanish ballads, which in 1823 were published separately.

In 1825 Lockhart acted as an agent on behalf of the Faculty of Advocates to purchase the Astorga Collection. The collection is now housed at the National Library of Scotland.

In 1825 Benjamin Disraeli visited him at his father-in-law's estate at Abbotsford in an unsuccessful attempt to persuade him to accept the editorship of The Representative a newspaper he was trying to establish with the backing of the publisher John Murray. Instead the same year Lockhart accepted Murray's offer of the editorship of the Quarterly Review, which had been in the hands of Sir John Taylor Coleridge since William Gifford's resignation in 1824.

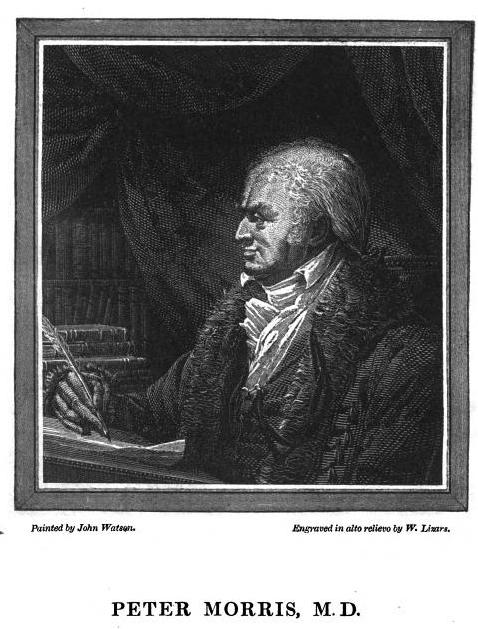
Lockhart's fictional Peter Morris M.D., 1819 engraving by William Home Lizars

At this time he was living at 25 Northumberland Street in Edinburgh's New Town. In 1825 he sold the house to Andrew and George Combe.

As the next heir to the Scotland property belonging to his unmarried half-brother, Milton Lockhart, he was sufficiently independent. In London he had social success, and was recognised as an editor. He contributed largely to the Quarterly Review himself, particularly biographical articles. He showed the old, railing spirit in an article in the Quarterly against Tennyson's Poems of 1833. He continued to write for Blackwood's, producing for Constable's Miscellany Vol. XXIII in 1828 a controversial Life of Robert Burns. Snyder wrote of it, "The best that one can say of it today...is that it occasioned Carlyle's review. It is inexcusably inaccurate from beginning to end, at times demonstrably mendacious, and should never be trusted in any respect or detail."

== Later works ==
Lockhart undertook the editorial supervision of Murray's Family Library, which he opened in 1829 with a History of Napoleon.

However, his major work, and the one for which he is known, is the Life of Walter Scott (7 vols, 1837–1838; 2nd edition, 10 vols., 1839). This biography included the publishing of a great number of Scott's letters. Thomas Carlyle assessed it in a criticism contributed to the London and Westminster Review (1837). Lockhart's account of the business transactions between Scott and the Ballantynes and Constable caused an outcry; and in the discussion that followed he showed bitterness in his pamphlet The Ballantyne Humbug handled. The Life of Scott has been called, after Boswell's Life of Samuel Johnson, the most admirable biography in the English language. The proceeds, which were considerable, Lockhart resigned for the benefit of Scott's creditors.

== Family and final years ==
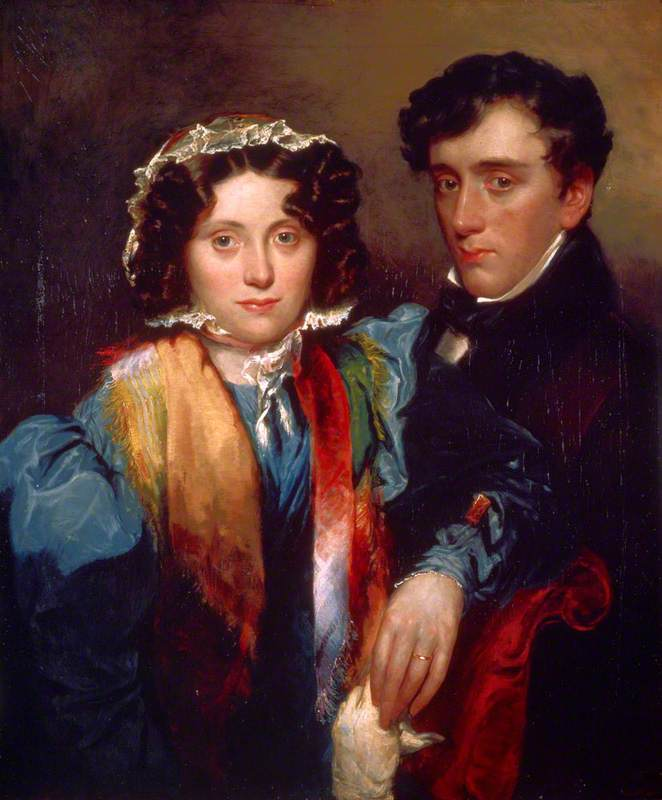
Lockhart and Sophia, by Robert Scott Lauder

In 1818, Lockhart met Sir Walter Scott, who introduced him to his family. Lockhart married Scott's eldest daughter Sophia in April 1820. It was a happy marriage, with winters spent in Edinburgh and summers at Chiefswood, a cottage on Scott's Abbotsford estate, where the Lockharts' first child John Hugh ‘Johnnie’ was born. John Hugh was born with spina bifida and spent much of his time with his grandfather, listening to Scott’s stories about Scottish history, hence Scott’s book, Tales of a Grandfather. Johnnie died in 1831, at age eleven.

The Lockharts experienced many personal losses. A baby girl died soon after birth. Sir Walter died in 1832 and in 1837, Sophia died suddenly, at age 38. Lockhart also struggled with the loss of his parents and sister. His third child was Walter Scott Lockhart, who became an army officer, but fell into bad company, ruined his health, and died in his father’s arms in January 1853 at the age of 26. Lockhart became seriously depressed, almost starving himself to death. He resigned his editorship of the Quarterly Review and spent some time in Italy, but returned without recovering his health.

He moved back to Scotland to live with his only surviving child Charlotte, who was settled at Abbotsford with her husband James Hope-Scott, grandson of the 2nd Earl of Hopetoun. The two had converted to Catholicism, which made for an uncomfortable atmosphere in the home (Charlotte would die in childbirth in 1858, at age 30). Lockhart died a few weeks after his arrival at Abbotsford, on 25 November 1854. He was buried at Dryburgh Abbey, beside his son and father-in-law.

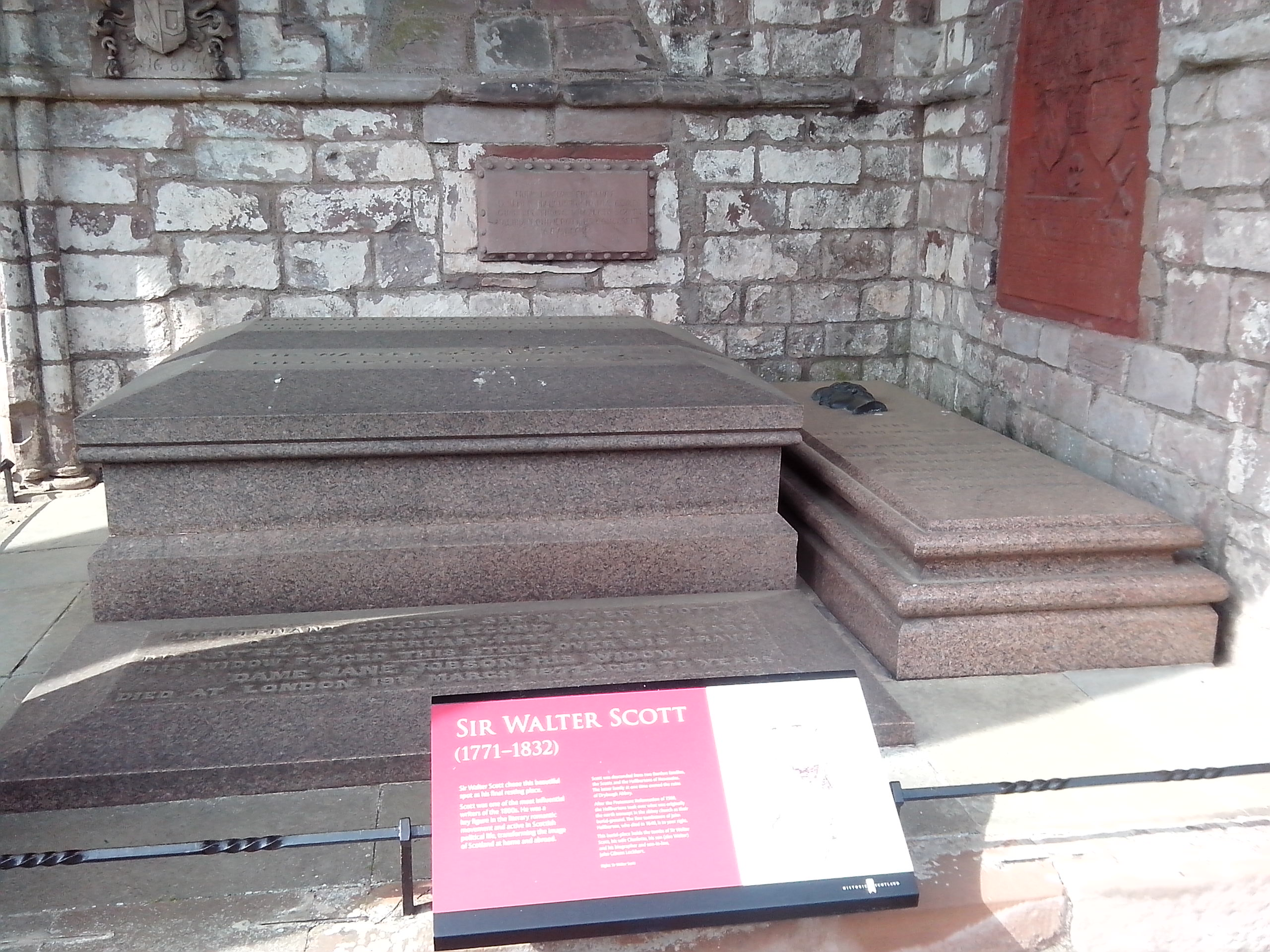
Scott family graves at Dryburgh Abbey – Lockhart's grave is on the right; the largest is that of Sir Walter and Lady Charlotte Scott; the inscribed slab covers the Scotts' son's grave, Lieutenant Colonel Sir Walter Scott

His obituary in The Times, dated 9 December 1854, included the paragraph "Endowed with the very highest order of manly beauty, both of features and expression, he retained the brilliancy of youth and a stately strength of person comparatively unimpaired in ripened life; and then, though sorrow and sickness suddenly brought on a premature old age which none could witness unmoved, yet the beauty of the head and of the bearing so far gained in melancholy loftiness of expression what they lost in animation, that the last phase, whether to the eye of painter or of anxious friend, seemed always the finest."

== Freemasonry ==
Like his father-in-law he was a Freemason although he was initiated in a different Edinburgh Lodge – Lodge Canongate Kilwinning, No. 2, on 26 January 1826.

== Legacy ==
Robert Scott Lauder painted two portraits of Lockhart, one of him alone, and the other with Charlotte Scott.

The composer Hubert Parry set a modified version of the second half of Lockhart's poem 'Beyond' to music, "There is an old belief" as the fourth of his collection of six choral motets, Songs of Farewell. The pieces were first performed at a concert at the Royal College of Music on 22 May 1916. The song/poem was later sung at the composer's funeral in St Paul's Cathedral on 23 February 1919.
