= William Blackwood =

Scottish publisher (1776–1834)

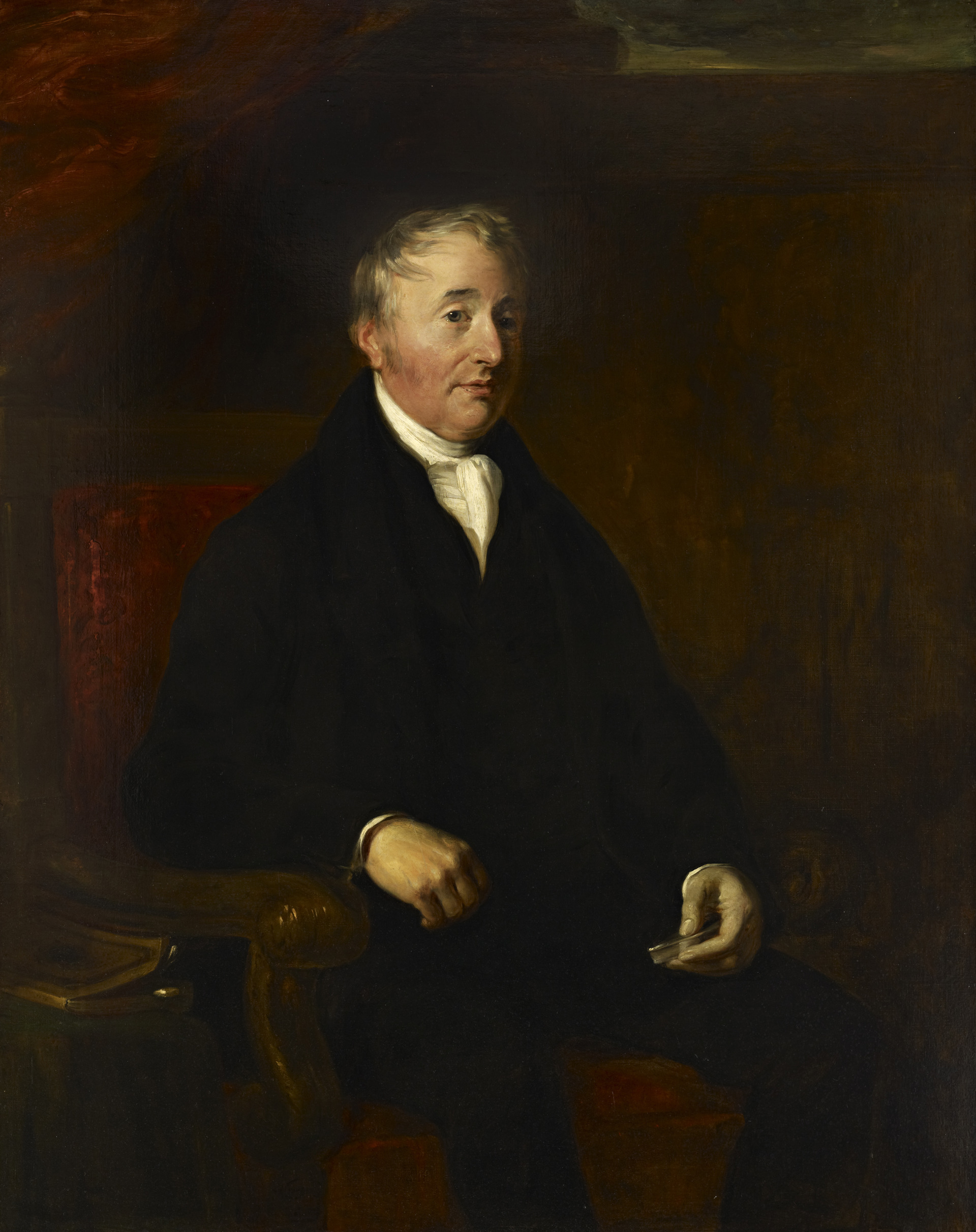
Portrait by William Allan, c. 1830

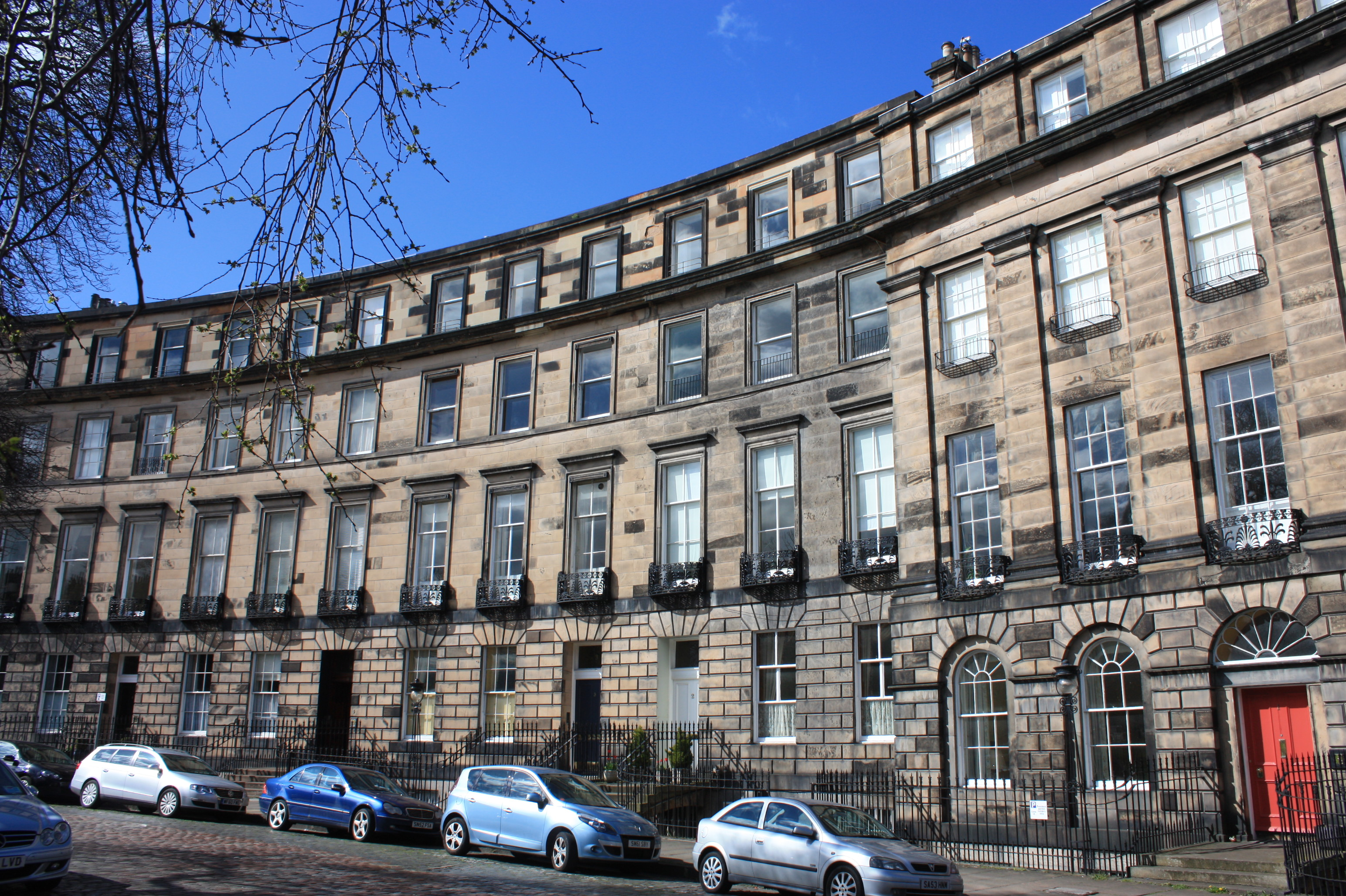
1 to 7 Ainslie Place, Edinburgh. No 3 was the home of William Blackwood

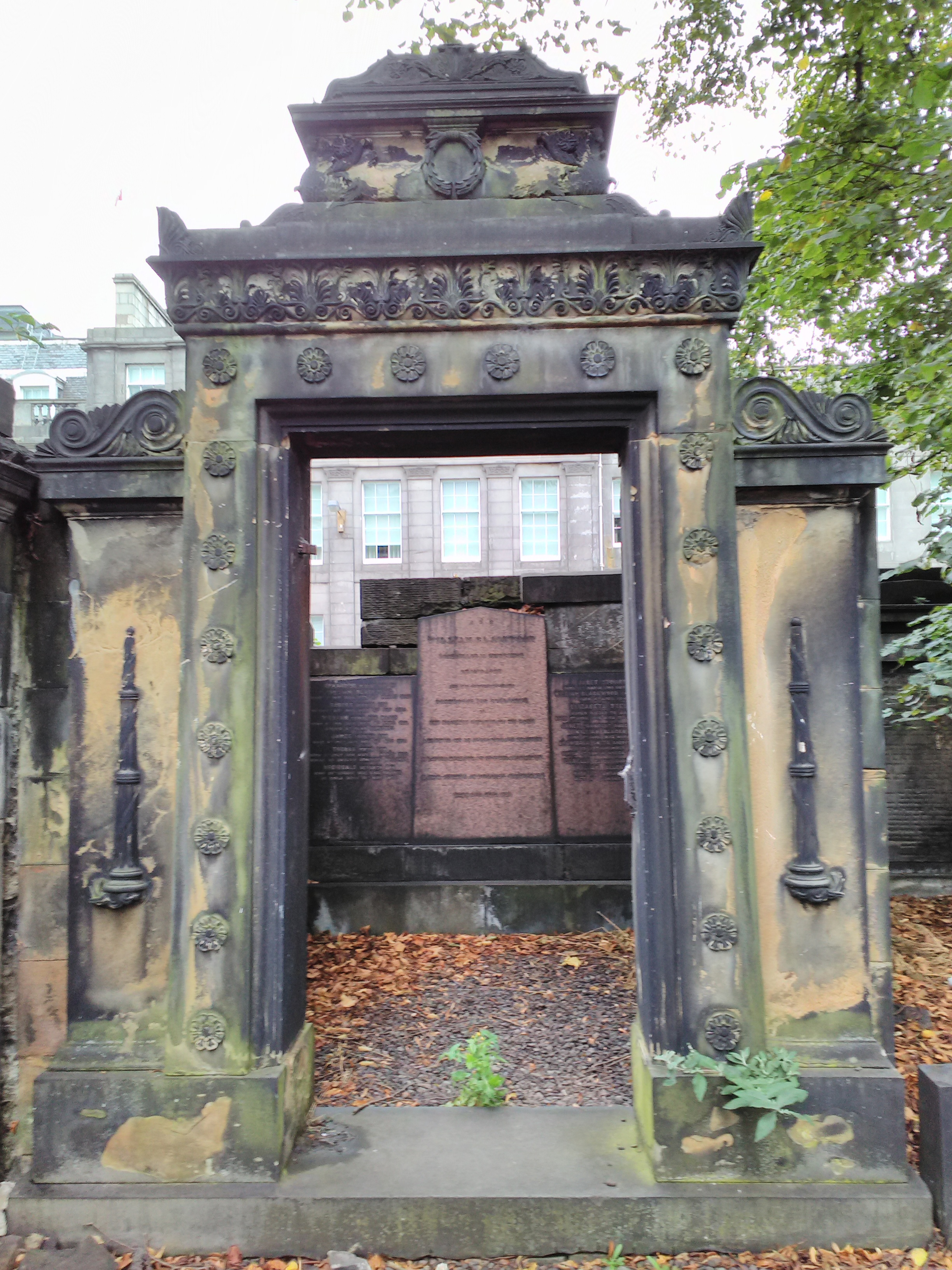
William Blackwood's grave, Old Calton Cemetery, Edinburgh

William Blackwood (20 November 1776 – 16 September 1834) was a Scottish publisher who founded the firm of William Blackwood and Sons.

== Life ==
Blackwood was born in Edinburgh on 20 November 1776. At the age of 14 he was apprenticed to a firm of booksellers in Edinburgh, and he followed his calling also in Glasgow and London for several years. Returning to Edinburgh in 1804, he opened a shop in South Bridge Street for the sale of old, rare and curious books. He undertook the Scottish agency for John Murray and other London publishers, and gradually drifted into publishing on his own account (later known as William Blackwood and Sons), moving in 1816 to Princes Street. That same year, Blackwood convinced Walter Scott to abandon Archibald Constable as his Edinburgh publisher. Blackwood's first deal as publisher was the next novel in Scott's Tales of my Landlord series.

On 1 April 1817, the first number of the Edinburgh Monthly Magazine was published, which on its seventh number became Blackwood's Edinburgh Magazine. "Maga", as this magazine soon came to be called, was the organ of the Scottish Tory party, and round it gathered a host of writers. This included John Neal, making Maga the first British literary journal to publish work by an American, and the publisher of the first history of US literature, Neal's series American Writers (1824–25). In 1825 he published Neal's 1,324-page novel Brother Jonathan at a great financial loss. Their relationship fell apart shortly thereafter.

In 1829, he wrote to his son William in India telling him that he was moving from Princes Street to 45 George Street as George Street was "becoming more and more a place of business and the east end of Princes Street is now like Charring Cross, a mere place for coaches". His brother Thomas bought 43 George and in 1830 Thomas Hamilton remodelled the entire frontage of the pair for the Blackwood Brothers. Thomas's shop operated as a silk merchant.

At the end of his life, Blackwood was living at 3 Ainslie Place on Edinburgh's elegant Moray Estate in the West End. His bookshop was within easy walking distance, being located at 45 George Street.

William Blackwood died in 1834 and is buried in an ornate vault in the lower western section of Old Calton Burial Ground.

== In fiction ==
The character Oakstick in John Paterson's Mare, James Hogg's allegorical satire on the Edinburgh publishing scene, is based on William Blackwood.

== Family ==
William Blackwood married Janet Steuart (1780–1849) on 29 October 1805. They had a large family. Most of his sons joined his publishing firm in some capacity. All are buried with him at the Old Calton Burial Ground except where stated:

- Alexander Blackwood (1806–1845)
- Robert Blackwood (1808–1852)
- Major William Blackwood (1810–1861) came later into the publishing business after a military beginning.
- Isabella Blackwood (1812–1897)
- James Blackwood (1814–1871)
- Thomas Blackwood (1816–1855) (buried in Boulogne)
- John Blackwood (1819–1879) who took over editorship of Blackwood's Magazine (buried in Dean Cemetery)
- Col Archibald Blackwood (1821–1870) adopted a military career, died in Simla in India.
- Janet Blackwood (1823–1870), married Archibald Smith and moved to London (buried in Kensal Green Cemetery)
