= The Porteous Mob =

1855 painting by James Drummond

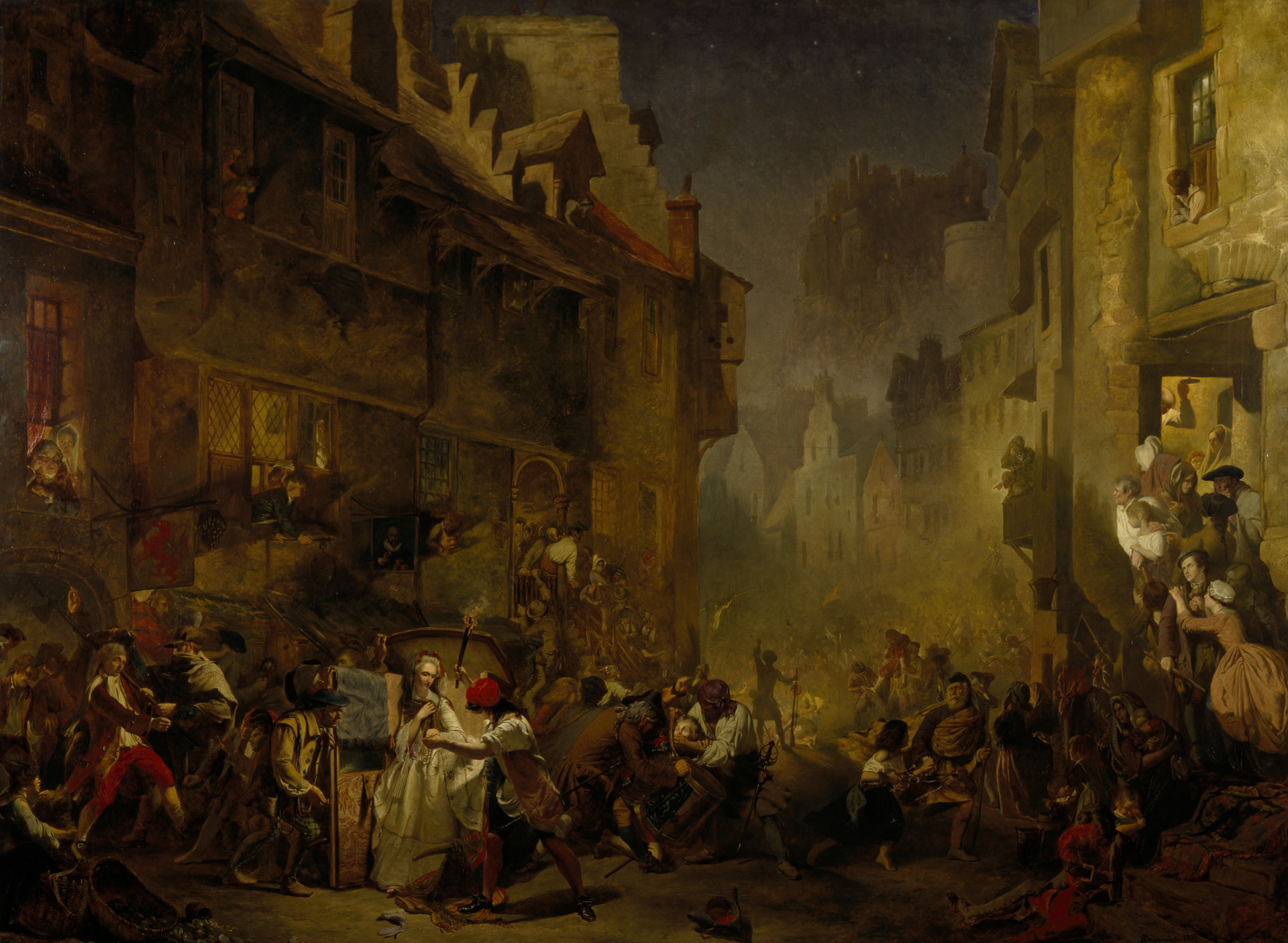
- Artist: James Drummond
- Year: 1855
- Medium: Oil on canvas
- Dimensions: 111.80 × 152.50 cm
- Location: Scottish National Gallery, Edinburgh

The Porteous Mob is an oil painting by the Scottish painter James Drummond in 1855. It portrays the Porteous Riots of 1736, one of the most violent moments in the history of Edinburgh. Due to the popularity of this painting, it was purchased as a part of the foundation collection at the Scottish National Gallery in 1856.

== About ==
Among his pieces, Drummond often created elaborate depictions of Scottish historical and literary events. His portrayal of the gory Porteous Riots was one such painting. People gathered at the Grassmarket, where Andrew Wilson and George Robertson, local robbers and merchants, were hanged, on April 14, 1736. A disturbance broke out, and when the detested City Guard Captain John Porteous gave the order for his soldiers to open fire into the crowd, the mob was subdued, instantly killing a man and injuring numerous innocent bystanders. Porteous received a death sentence after being convicted guilty of murder at the High Court of Justice. When the people of town learned of his later pardon from the Secretary of State's Office, they made the decision to act independently. They attacked the Guard House on the Royal Mile with Bayonet and Lochaber axes before taking control of the city's ports. The mob then marched to the Old Tolbooth on the Royal Mile, a jail known as the Heart of Midlothian (Royal Mile). Porteous was violently hung from a dyer's pole after being carried from his hiding place in a chimney to the Grassmarket.

Drummond's portrayal of this scene aptly describes the historical episode in Sir Walter Scott's 1818 novel The Heart of Midlothian. This artwork was later turned into an engraving on paper by Edward Burton.

== Description ==
Drummond is a renowned antiquarian, and his paintings reflect his thorough understanding of Edinburgh's Old Town's histories. Drummond's dramatic interpretation of the events in Sir Walter Scott's novel takes place against a beautiful backdrop of the Grassmarket in Edinburgh. Based on his own vivid paintings of Old Town buildings in the 1840s and 1850s, Drummond created a dramatic lighting scheme for his "stage set" of the Castle and the Grassmarket apartments. Torches illuminate Candlemaker Rows and faces can be seen peeping out of every window, where rioters stop a woman in her vehicle and drag a drummer to the cobblestones. The violent mob is depicted in this artwork dragging the helpless Porteous towards the dyer's pole.
