= 1736 in Great Britain =

Events from the year 1736 in Great Britain.

== Incumbents ==
- Monarch – George II
- Regent – Caroline, Queen Consort (starting 24 May)
- Prime Minister – Robert Walpole (Whig)

== Events ==
- 12 January – George Hamilton, 1st Earl of Orkney becomes the first Field Marshal of Great Britain.
- 14 April – Porteous Riots in Edinburgh. Captain John Porteous orders his men to fire into the mob, causing six deaths.
- 19 April – 53 houses in the Northamptonshire town of Stony Stratford are consumed by fire.
- 8 May – marriage of Frederick, Prince of Wales and Augusta of Saxe-Gotha.
- 26 May – Battle of Ackia: British and Chickasaw Native Americans defeat French troops.
- 24 June – Witchcraft Act 1735 comes into effect, introducing penalties for pretending to practice or accusing others of practising witchcraft and repealing those against its supposed actual practice, intended to end legal witch trials in the early modern period in Britain.
- 5 July – Captain Porteous found guilty of murder by the High Court of Justiciary.
- 27 July – riots in east London protesting at Irish immigrants providing cheap labour.
- 7 September – Edinburgh crowd drags Captain Porteous out of his cell in Tolbooth prison and lynches him. The mob beats and hangs him to death.
- 29 September – Gin Act 1736 comes into effect in an attempt to curtail the Gin Craze.
- c. October – Winchester County Hospital, established by Prebendary Alured Clarke, the first voluntary general hospital in the English provinces, begins to function in Hampshire.
- One of the earliest records of use of a bathing machine is made at Scarborough, North Yorkshire.

== Publications ==
- Sir Matthew Hale's legal treatise Historia Placitorum Coronæ; or The History of the Pleas of the Crown (posthumous).
- Isaac Newton's book Method of Fluxions.

== Births ==
- 19 January – James Watt, Scottish inventor (died 1819)
- 29 February – Ann Lee, founder of the Shakers (died 1784)
- 10 May – George Steevens, literary critic (died 1800)
- 25 June – John Horne Tooke, politician and philologist (died 1812)
- 15 August – Alexander Runciman, Scottish painter (died 1785)
- 27 October – James Macpherson, Scottish poet (died 1796)
- James Tylney-Long, politician (died 1794)

== Deaths ==
- 1 February – James Stanley, 10th Earl of Derby, politician (born 1664)
- 7 February – Stephen Gray, dyer, astronomer and scientist (born 1666)
- 18 March – Jacob Tonson, bookseller and publisher (born c. 1655)
- 25 March – Nicholas Hawksmoor, architect (born c. 1661)
- 7 July – William Hardres, politician (born 1686)
- 7 September – Captain John Porteous, soldier (born c. 1695)
- 22 October – George Clarke, politician and architect (born 1661)
- 17 December – John Mills, actor (born c. 1670)
- 22 December – Sir William Robinson, 1st Baronet, politician (born 1655)
- undated – Bay Bolton, racehorse (born 1705)

== See also ==
- 1736 in Wales
