= Porteous Riots =

Riot in Edinburgh, Scotland in 1736

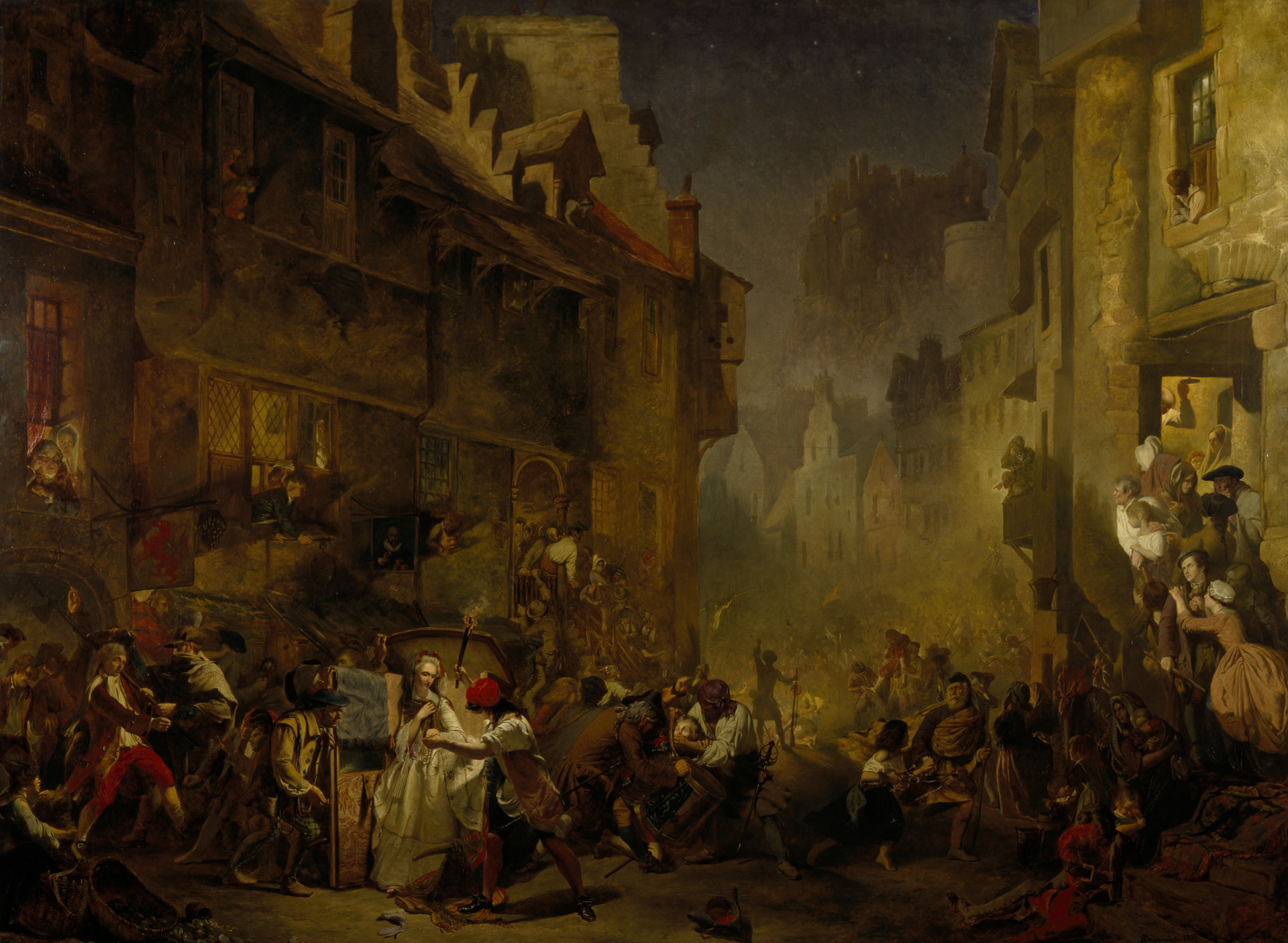
The Porteous Mob, painted in 1855 by James Drummond

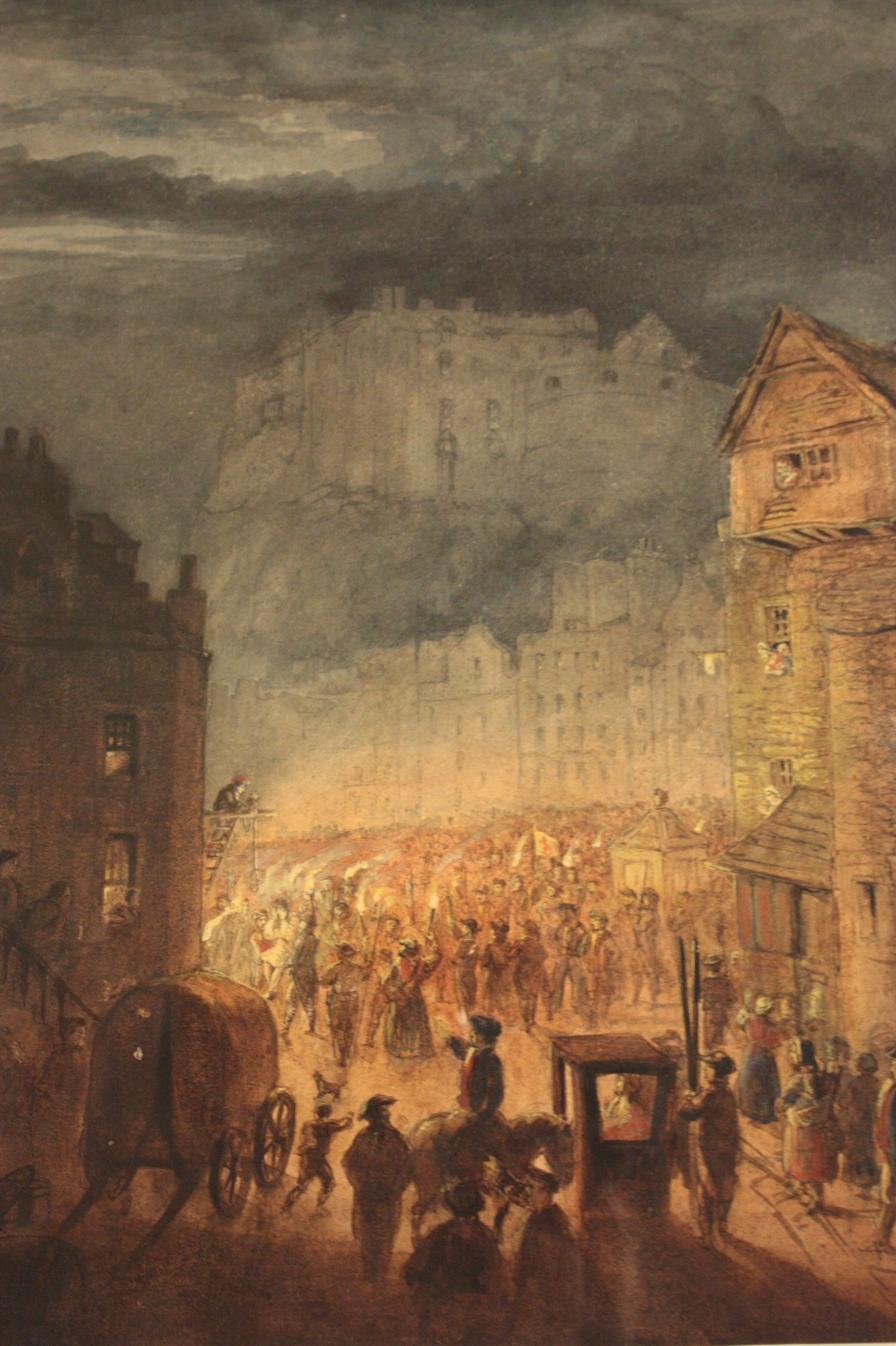
The Porteous Riot by James Skene, 1818

The Porteous Riots surrounded the activities of John Porteous, Captain of the City Guard of Edinburgh, Scotland, who was lynched by a mob for his part in the killing of innocent civilians while ordering the men under his command to quell a disturbance during a public hanging in the Grassmarket, Edinburgh in April 1736. Although the rioters were generally supportive of the convicted smugglers, Porteous seems to have been a somewhat overbearing official, despised by the mob and the underclasses of Edinburgh society.

== Riot ==
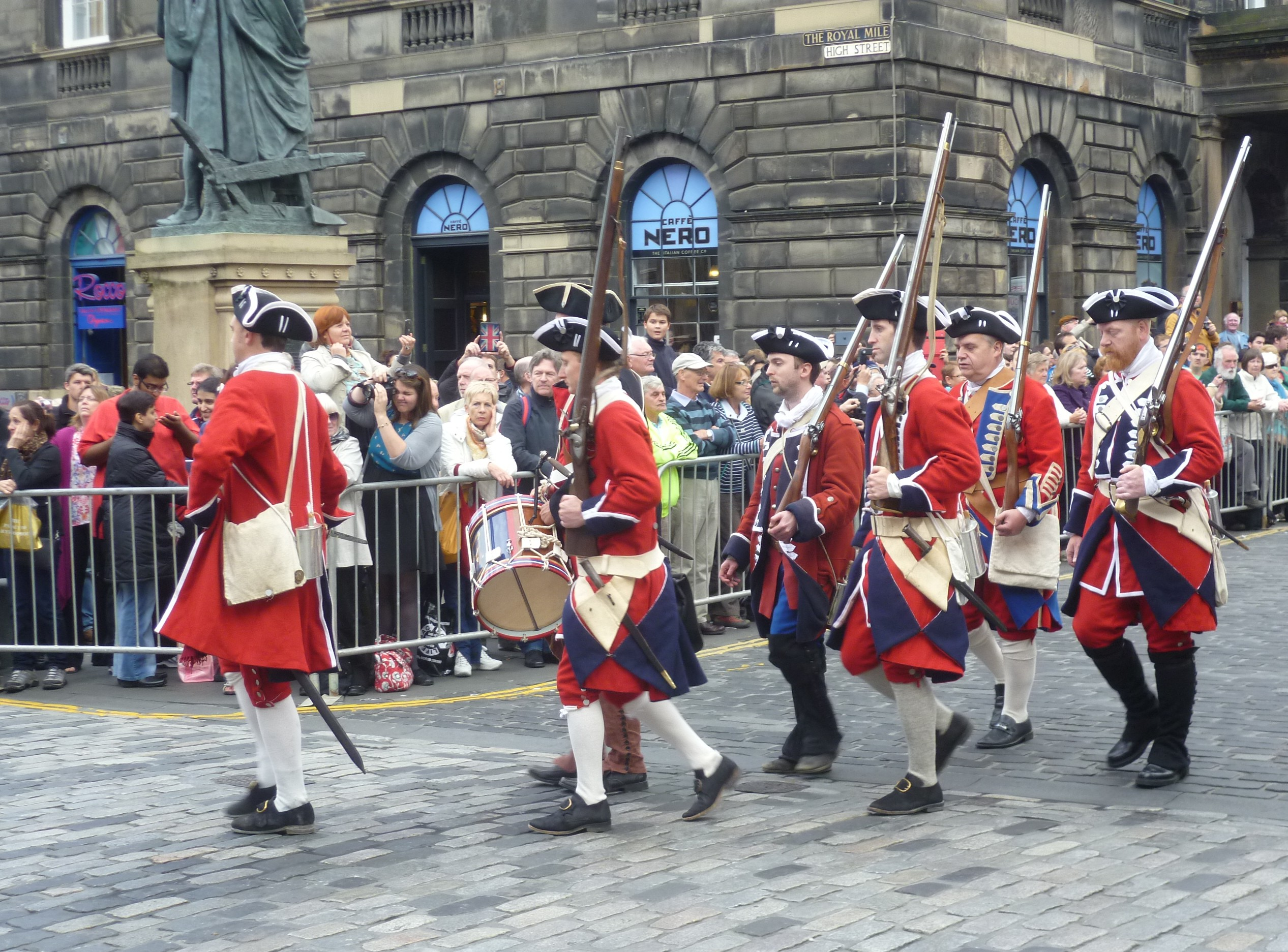
Re-enactors dressed as the Edinburgh City Guard at the time of the Porteous Riot

In April 1736 three convicted smugglers, Andrew Wilson, a "notorious smuggler", William Hall and George Robertson, had been tried and condemned to death. While Hall's sentence was commuted to exile, Wilson and Robertson awaited their fate in the condemned cell at Edinburgh's notorious Tolbooth Prison next to St Giles Cathedral. A few days before their execution the pair tried to escape. Wilson removed a bar from the cell window but became stuck "being a very stout man" and blocked Robertson's escape.

On 14 April 1736, Andrew Wilson was publicly hanged in the Grassmarket, whereas Robertson escaped during the condemned prisoners' church service at St Giles a few days prior to the execution. However, when the body of Wilson was cut down by a sailor, Captain Porteous of the City Guard reacted by grabbing a musket and firing at the sailor. Unfortunately he missed and killed a man standing behind in the crowd. Porteous ordered the City Guards to fire on the enraged crowd, killing a further five people. In the ensuing riot, the hangman, Porteous, and the city guards sought refuge in the City Guardhouse on the Royal Mile where the situation worsened. This prompted the Lord Provost of Edinburgh to instruct Captain Porteous to call out the entire City Guard, furnish them with powder and shot, and ensure the guardhouse was not stormed by the rioters.

Accounts of events that followed are confusing but what is certain is that Captain Porteous initially instructed his troops to fire above the heads of the crowd. However, in so doing, they wounded people in the windows of the surrounding tenement buildings which just made the crowd even more violent. As panic set in, Porteous ordered the City Guard to shoot directly into the mob which led to the deaths of another six people. However, the rioters retreated and the streets quietened.

== Conviction and deferment of execution ==
Porteous was arrested the same afternoon and charged with murder. On 5 July 1736, he was tried at the High Court of Justiciary. A majority of witnesses testified that Porteous had personally fired into the crowd on 14 April, although sixteen others said they had not seen him do so. Feelings were running high in Edinburgh when the jury unanimously found Porteous guilty of murder. He was sentenced to death and the execution was set to take place in the Grassmarket on 8 September 1736. Porteous was imprisoned in the same condemned cell in the Tolbooth that had earlier held Wilson and Robertson.

Events in Scotland alarmed the government in London, and Sir Robert Walpole attempted to influence events by asking his representative in Edinburgh to become involved. A formal appeal was petitioned to Queen Caroline, who ordered the execution to be deferred by six weeks, pending the return of the king from Hanover. But Walpole had miscalculated, underestimating the depth of feeling in Scotland.

== Public lynching ==
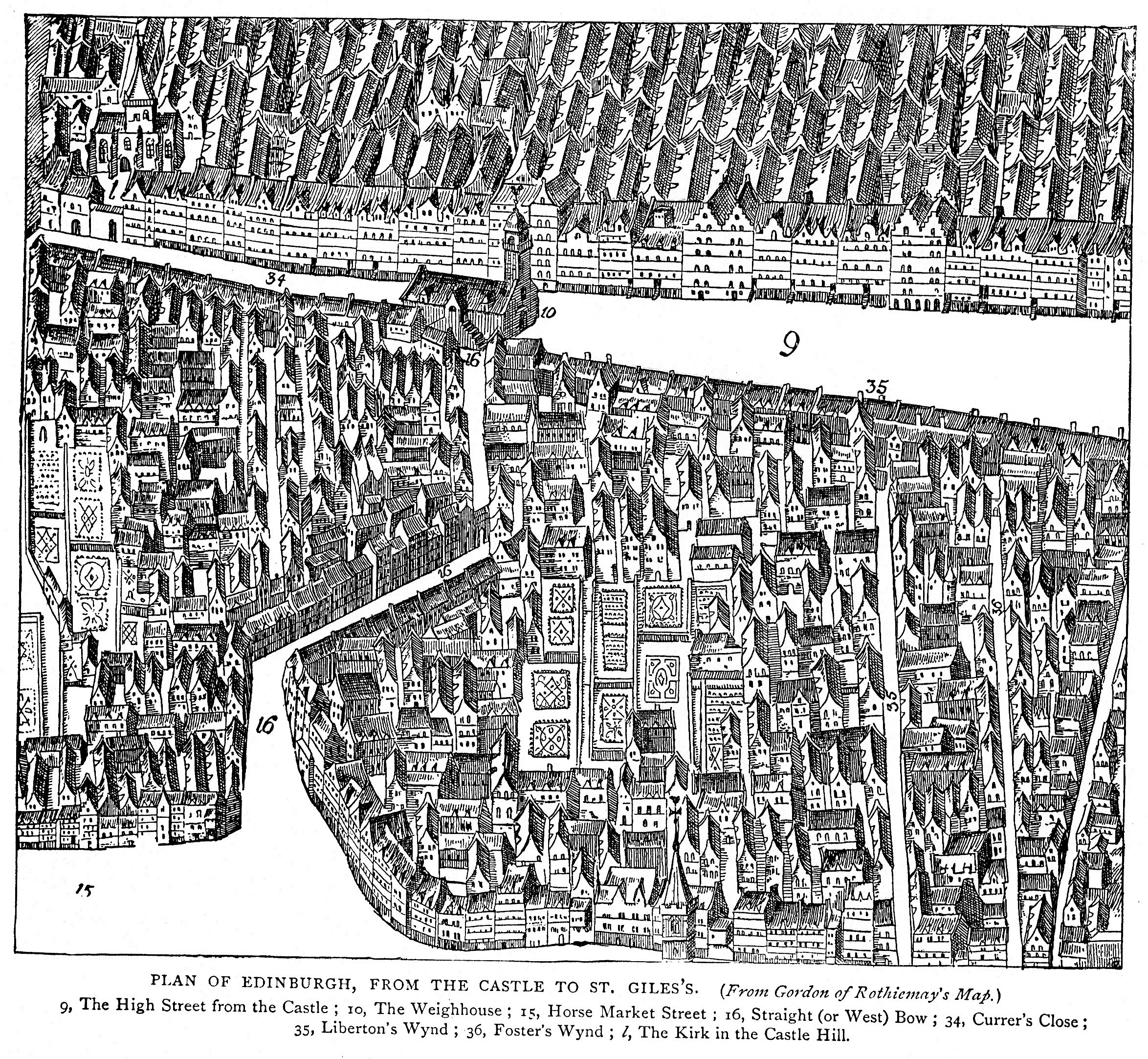
Drawing of the West Bow in Edinburgh, which connected the Lawnmarket to the Grassmarket

The deferment of the sentence caused public resentment in Edinburgh, with people mistakenly believing that Porteous had been fully reprieved. The city authorities increased the guard at the Tolbooth prison when they learned that there was a plot to lynch the imprisoned Captain. However, the evening before it was due to happen, a mob of more than four thousand gathered at Portsburgh, west of the city. They made their way across the Grassmarket to the Cowgate and up to the High Street before converging on the Tolbooth. Eventually the mob was able to overpower the guards and Porteous was dragged from his cell up the Lawnmarket to the West Bow and down to the Grassmarket. It was there that he was hanged from a dyer's pole using a rope taken from a local draper's shop.

After a short while Porteus was pulled down and stripped naked. His nightgown and shirt were then wrapped around his head before he was hanged again. However, as his hands were untied, he was able to struggle free. Some of the mob began beating him savagely, breaking his arm and shoulder and an attempt was made to set his naked foot alight. He was hauled up again and hung and died a short while later just before midnight on 7 September 1736. He was buried in Greyfriars Kirkyard, Edinburgh, the following day.

== Aftermath ==
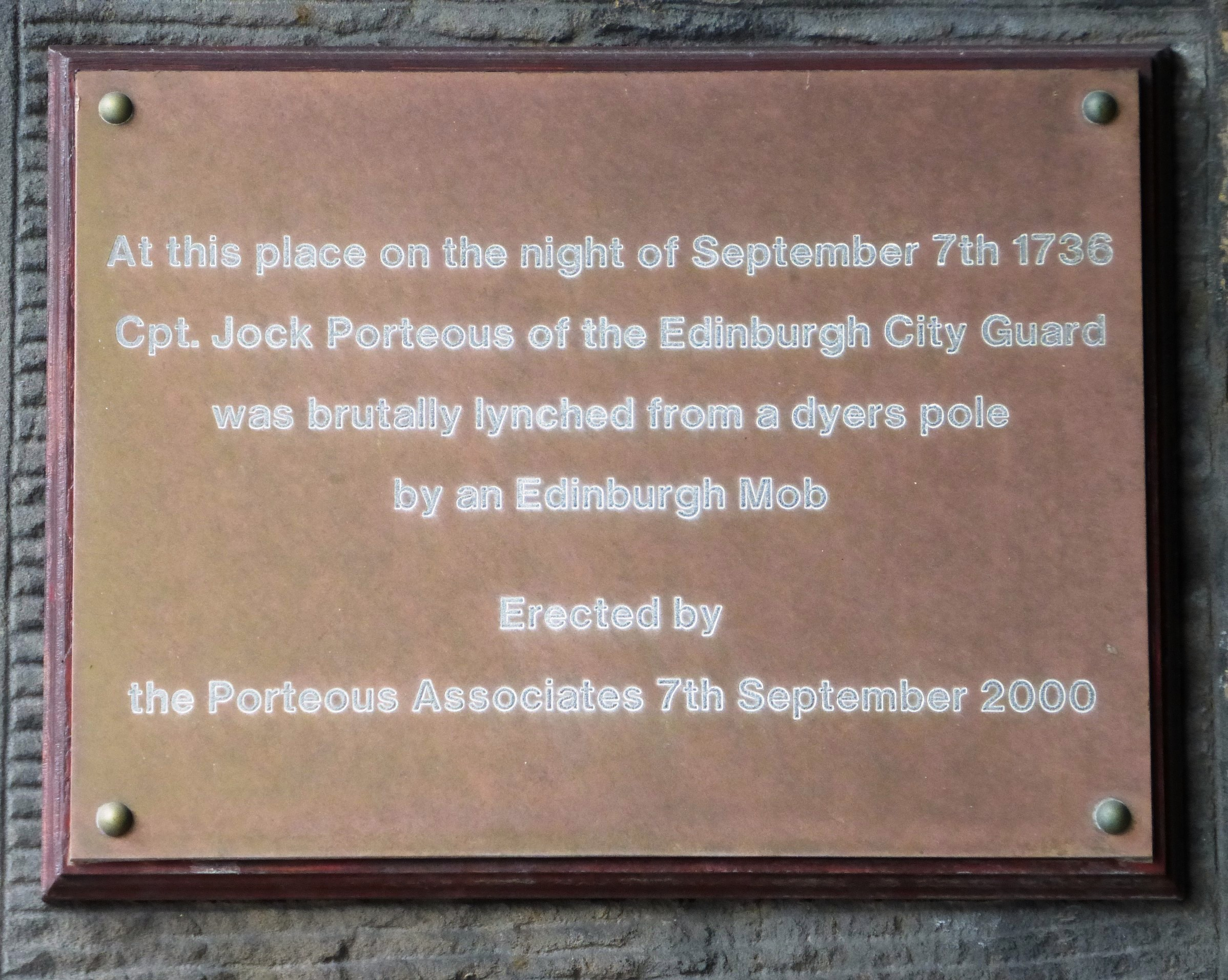
A plaque marks the spot where the lynching of Porteous took place.

The events in Edinburgh heightened the sense of alarm in London, where the government was concerned about its control of Scotland. Prime Minister Robert Walpole, Queen Caroline and the Secretary of State Duke of Newcastle thought that Porteous had been unnecessarily sacrificed to appease the mob and there were even rumours that the local city magistrates had been involved in the conspiracy.

In February 1737 a parliamentary inquiry was held in the House of Lords, It initially proposed the disbanding of the City Guard and removal of Netherbow Port, but these proposals were subsequently dropped. Eventually, the only punishments enforced were a £2,000 fine imposed on the city (used to support Porteous' widow) and the disbarment from all offices of the Lord Provost, Alexander Wilson.

It was variously thought that Porteous' murder was carried out by friends of those who had been shot and killed, revenge by the smugglers, a Jacobite plot, or even a conspiracy by Presbyterian extremists. However, the organisation of events seems to imply a degree of planning, thought to be the work of James Maxwell, an Edinburgh journeyman carpenter, together with a small group of city tradesmen and journeymen.

Despite a reward of £200 being made available by the government for information, those responsible for the murder of Porteous were never found.

== Legacy ==
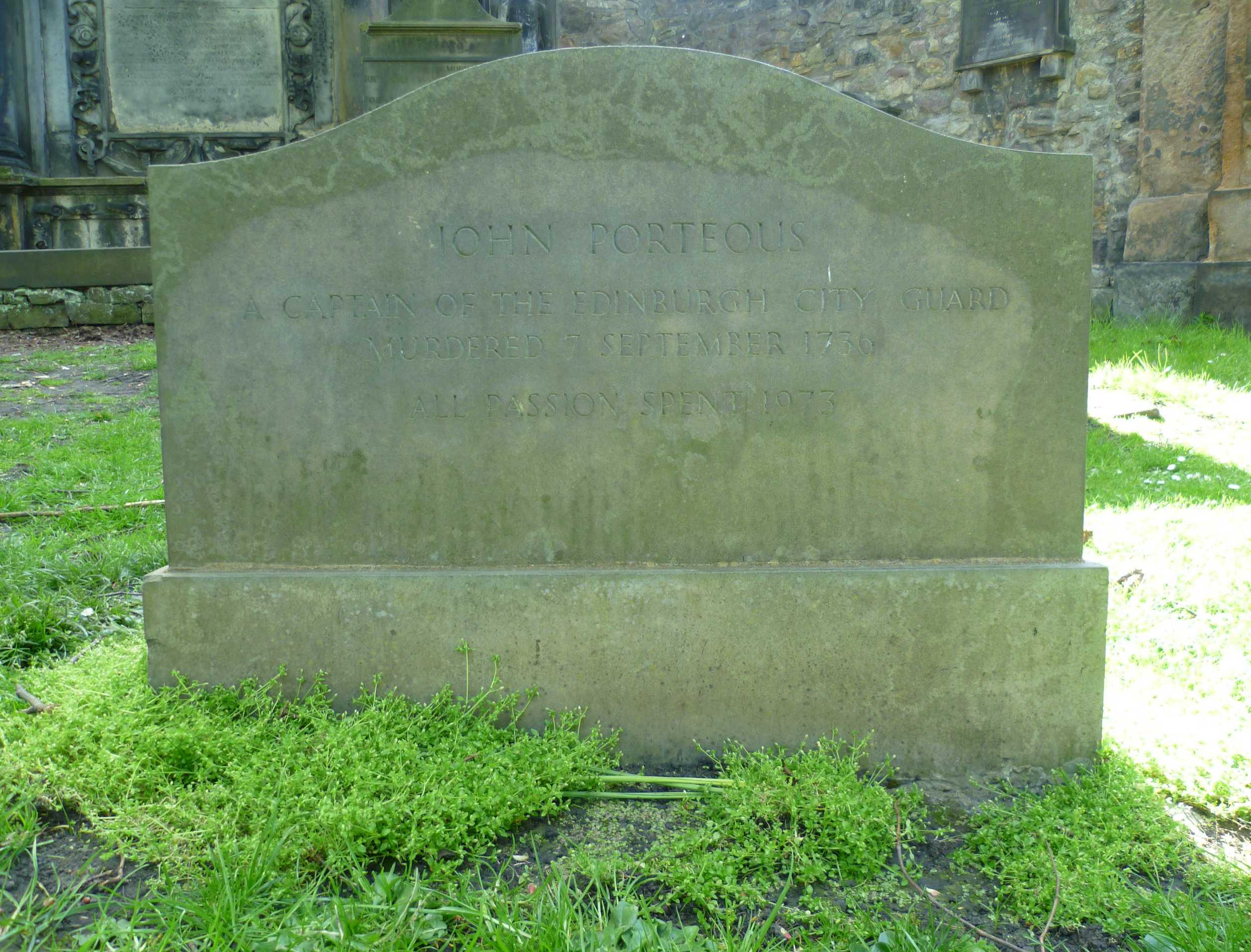
Porteous's grave

The final resting place of John Porteous in Greyfriars Kirkyard had for more than two hundred years been marked by a small square stone engraved with the single letter "P" and the date 1736. More recently, this has been replaced with a headstone of Craigleith stone, bearing the inscription "John Porteous, a captain of the City Guard of Edinburgh, murdered September 7, 1736. All Passion Spent, 1973."

The spot where Porteous died in the Grassmarket is today marked by a memorial plate. The site of the notorious Tolbooth prison is marked by paving stones arranged in the form of a heart, known as the Heart of Midlothian. Even today, passers-by will spit on the spot, a tradition originally intended to demonstrate their contempt for the hated Tolbooth.

A fictionalised account of the lynching forms part of the early chapters of the novel The Heart of Mid-Lothian by Sir Walter Scott (1818).

== See also ==
- John Porteous (soldier)
- Porteous family
- The Heart of Mid-Lothian (work by Sir Walter Scott)
