= John Porteous (soldier) =

Scottish officer (c. 1695–1736)

Coordinates: 55.947531°N 3.194431°W

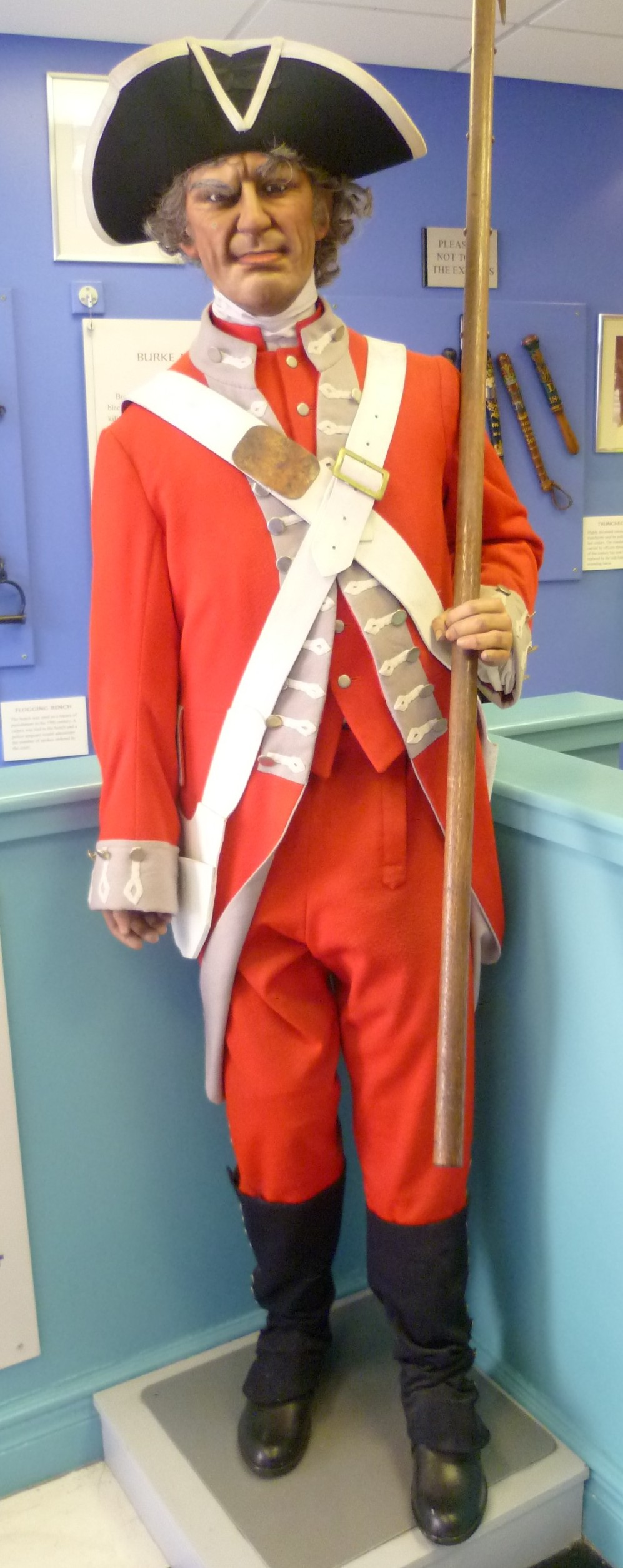
Uniform of the Edinburgh Town Guard

Captain John Porteous (c. 1695 – 7 September 1736) was a Scottish military officer who served in the Edinburgh City Guard and played a major role in the Porteous Riots, which resulted in his death.

== Early life ==
John Porteous was born at The Glen, Quair Water, near Traquair, in the Borders, the son of Stephen Porteous, a tailor of the Canongate, Edinburgh. Little is known of his early life, except that he soon found he was not suited to his father's calling. Having served in the Scots Brigade in the Dutch Republic, in 1716 he became drill master to the Edinburgh force in anticipation of a Jacobite rising, and two years later was appointed as ensign to the City Guard, and was promoted in 1726 to the rank of captain. Porteous seems to have been an overbearing official, despised by the mob and the underclasses of Edinburgh society.

In 1724 he lost a wager of 20 guineas in playing a game of golf on Leith Links against Alexander Elphinstone, the brother of Lord Balmerino. The wager attracted a small crowd, including the Duke of Hamilton and George Douglas.

== Riot ==
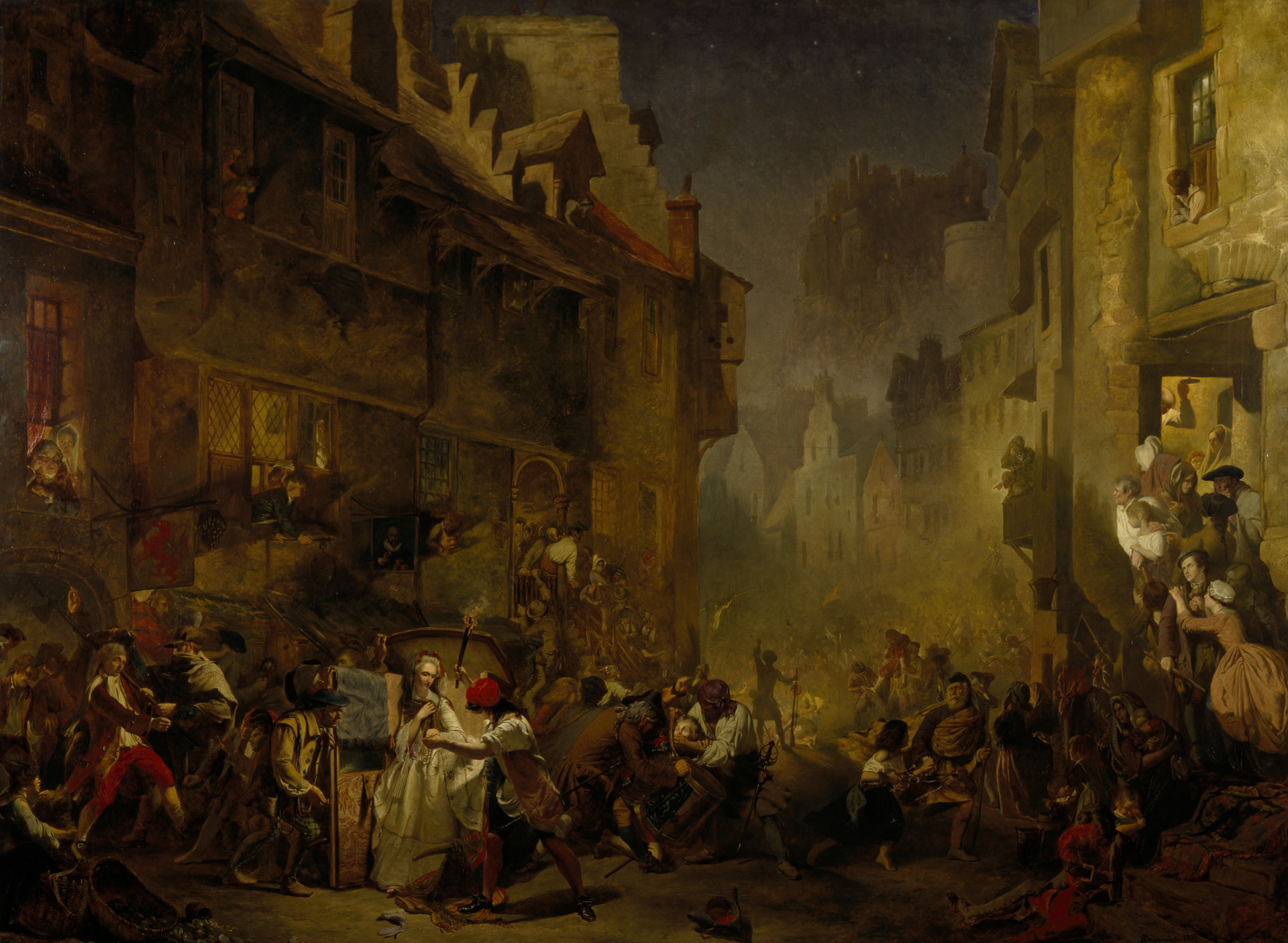
The Porteous Mob (1855), James Drummond

On 14 April 1736, three convicted smugglers, Andrew Wilson, William Hall and George Robertson, were arrested, tried and condemned to death. Hall's sentence was commuted to transportation for life, while Wilson and Robertson awaited their fate. A few days before the execution George Robertson was enabled by Wilson to escape from his guards while attending a service in St Giles', shouting "Run Geordie, run" as he held two officers and clamped his teeth onto the collar of a third. With the help of sympathetic supporters George Robertson eventually made his way to the Dutch Republic.

The remaining convict, Andrew Wilson, was taken to be publicly hanged in the Grassmarket, Edinburgh, on 14 April 1736. His body was cut down against the wishes of the mob, and the ensuing riot was such that the hangman had to be placed in protective custody. As the situation worsened, for fear of an attempt to rescue the victims, the Lord Provost of Edinburgh instructed Porteous to call out the entire guard and to furnish them with powder and shot.

After the execution, the mob became violent and began to stone the City Guard. Accounts of events are confused, but what is certain is that Porteous instructed his men to fire above the heads of the crowd, but in so doing, they wounded people in the windows of the high tenement buildings opposite. The crowd became increasingly violent and, as panic set in, Captain Porteous ordered the guard to shoot into the mob, which led to the deaths of six people in all.

== Trial and appeal ==
Porteous was arrested the same afternoon and charged with murder. He was tried at the High Court of Justiciary on 5 July 1736, where a majority of witnesses testified that Porteous had personally fired into the crowd on 14 April, although sixteen others said they had not seen him do so. Feelings were running high in Edinburgh and the jury unanimously found Porteous guilty of murder. He was sentenced to death, the execution was set to take place in the Grassmarket on 8 September 1736. Porteous was imprisoned in the Tolbooth prison, near St Giles church.

Events in Scotland alarmed government officials in London, and Sir Robert Walpole attempted to influence events by asking his representative in Edinburgh to become involved. But he had miscalculated, underestimating the depth of feeling in Scotland. A formal appeal was petitioned and the execution was deferred.

== Death ==
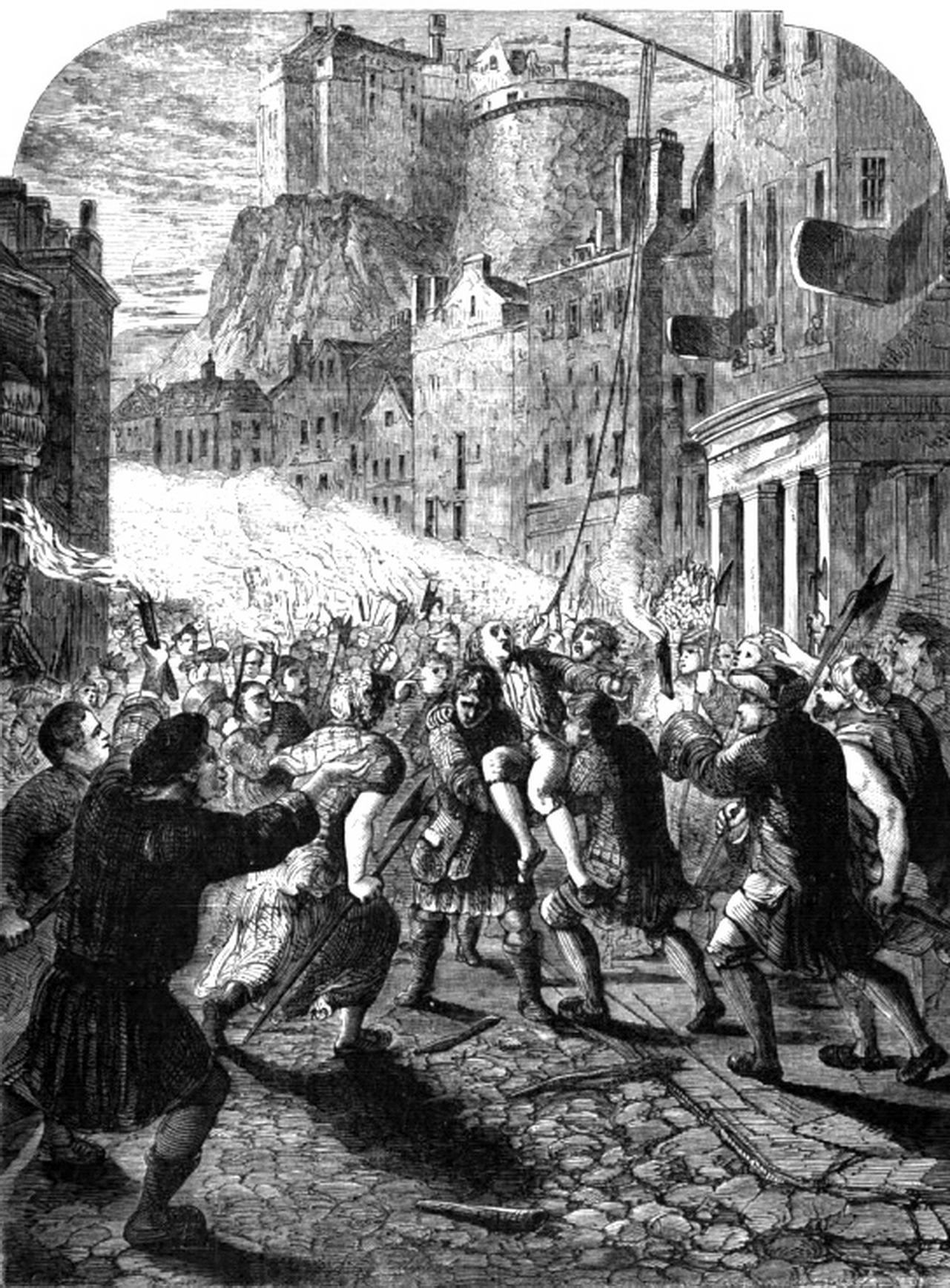
The Edinburgh Mob Carrying Captain Porteus to Execution

However, public resentment at a possible reprieve was such that a plot to kill Captain Porteous was hatched. On finding this out, the authorities in Edinburgh decided to increase the city guard at the Tolbooth. However, that evening just before this could happen, a four-thousand strong crowd gathered at Portsburgh, west of the city.

The mob made its way across the Grassmarket to the Cowgate and up the High Street before converging on the Tolbooth where they overpowered the out-numbered guards. Porteous was dragged from his cell and paraded down Lawnmarket, West Bow and onto Grassmarket. It was here that Porteous was brutally lynched up a short alleyway named Hunters Close. First he was hanged from a dyer's pole using a rope taken from a local draper's shop. After being choked for a while, the pole was lowered and he was stripped of his nightgown and shirt, which was wrapped around his head before he was hauled up again. However, as his hands had been untied to remove his clothes, this time he managed to struggle free. In retaliation his arm and shoulder were broken, and his foot set alight. After being hanged a third time, he was taken down again and viciously beaten before being hanged one last time. After the mob had dispersed, the battered body of Porteous was recovered by an armed detachment of the City Guard at around midnight on 7 September 1736.

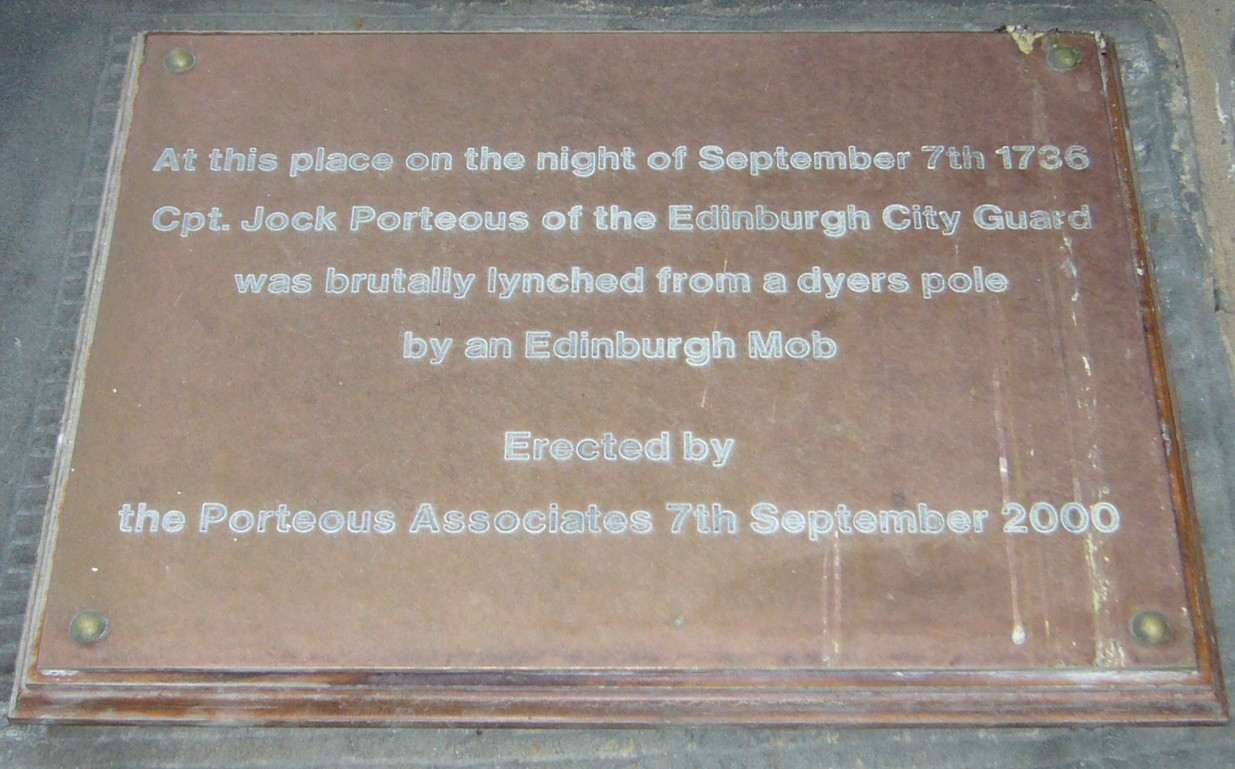
A memorial plaque was erected in 2000 at Hunters Close off Grassmarket where his lynching took occurred.

The location of Hunters Close where Porteous was brutally killed is today marked by a memorial plate erected in 2000 by the Porteous Association. The site of the Tolbooth is marked by paving stones arranged in the form of a heart, "The Heart of Midlothian". Tour guides will say that, even today, passers-by will spit on the spot, a tradition originally intended to demonstrate their contempt for the hated Tolbooth.

Porteous was buried in Greyfriars Kirkyard, Edinburgh, on 9 September, near the westmost wall of the original graveyard. For more than two hundred years, the grave was marked by a small square stone with the single letter P and the date 1736. In 1973, this was replaced with a headstone of Craigleith stone, bearing the inscription "John Porteous, a captain of the City Guard of Edinburgh, murdered September 7, 1736. All Passion Spent, 1973".

== Aftermath ==
The events in Edinburgh heightened the sense of alarm in London, where the government was concerned about the threat to its management of Scotland. It was thought by Walpole, Queen Caroline and the Duke of Newcastle that Porteous had been unnecessarily sacrificed and there were even rumours that the conspiracy had involved the local city magistrates.

Various Opposition proposals to disband the city guard and debar the Lord Provost were put forward, and these were the subject of much debate – the Scottish MPs and the government strongly opposed these proposals for constitutional reasons, and nothing was ever done.

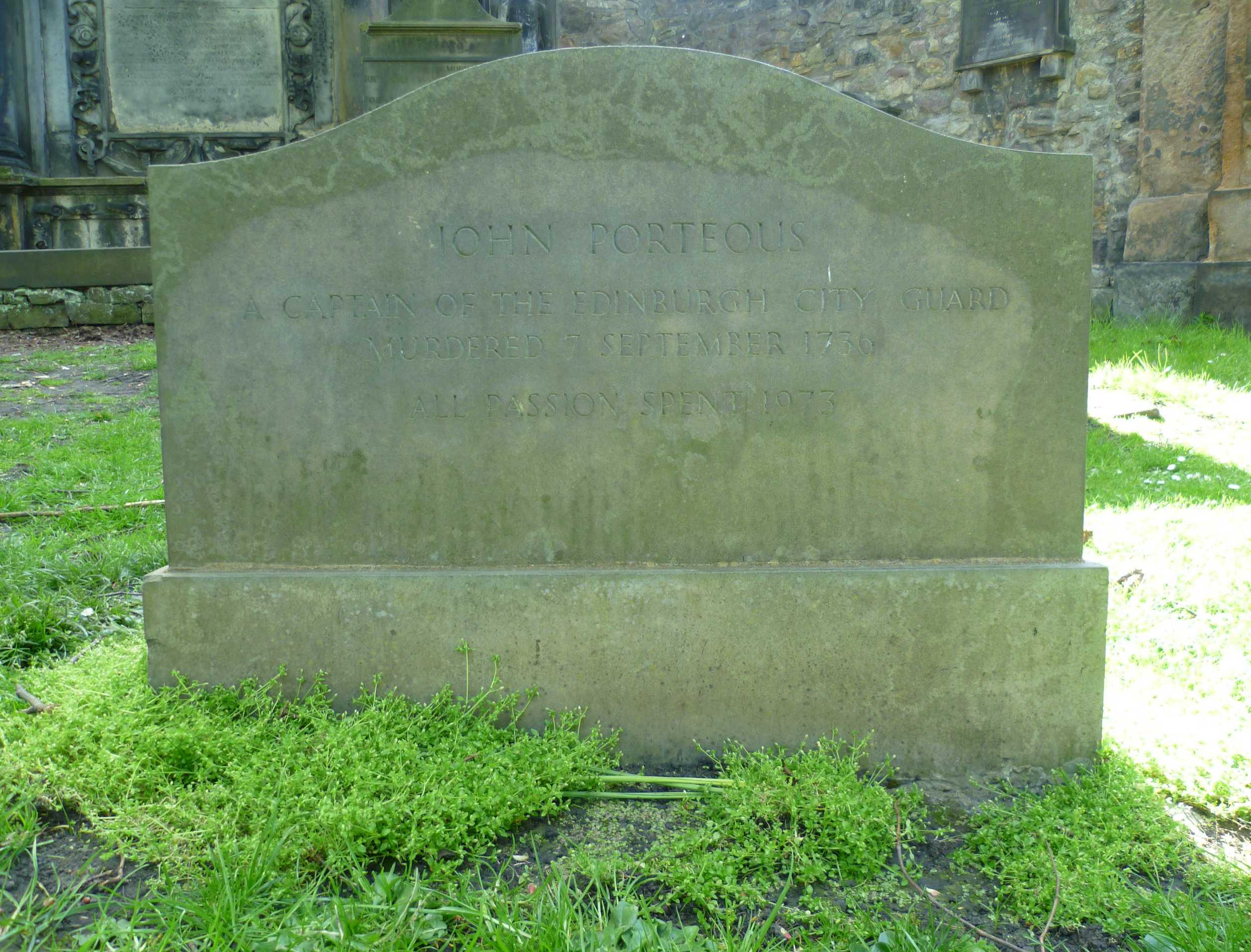
Porteous's grave

It was variously thought that Porteous' murder was carried out by friends of those who had been shot and killed, revenge by the smugglers, a Jacobite plot, or even a conspiracy by Presbyterian extremists. However, the organisation of events seems to imply a degree of planning, thought to be the work of James Maxwell, an Edinburgh journeyman carpenter, together with a small group of city tradesmen and journeymen. Despite a reward of £200 offered by the government for information, those responsible for the murder of Porteous were never brought to justice.

The events surrounding the Porteous Riots form part of the early chapters of the novel The Heart of Mid-Lothian by Sir Walter Scott (1818), where they are recorded in graphic detail.

== Porteous and golf ==
John Porteous had been an early exponent of the game of golf. It is recorded that in 1724, "A solemn match of golf: between the Hon. Alexander Elphinstone and John Porteous became the first match to be reported in a newspaper. Both players were said to have exhibited great skill, and such was the interest in the match that it was attended by James, Duke of Hamilton and George, Earl of Morton, as well as a large crowd of spectators. The wager was twenty guineas, with Elphinstone winning the match.

== See also ==
- Porteous Riots
- Porteous family
- Timeline of golf history 1353–1850
