= Grassmarket =

Market place in Edinburgh, Scotland

Coordinates: 55°56′51″N 3°11′46″W

- Square
- Margadh an Feur (Scottish Gaelic)
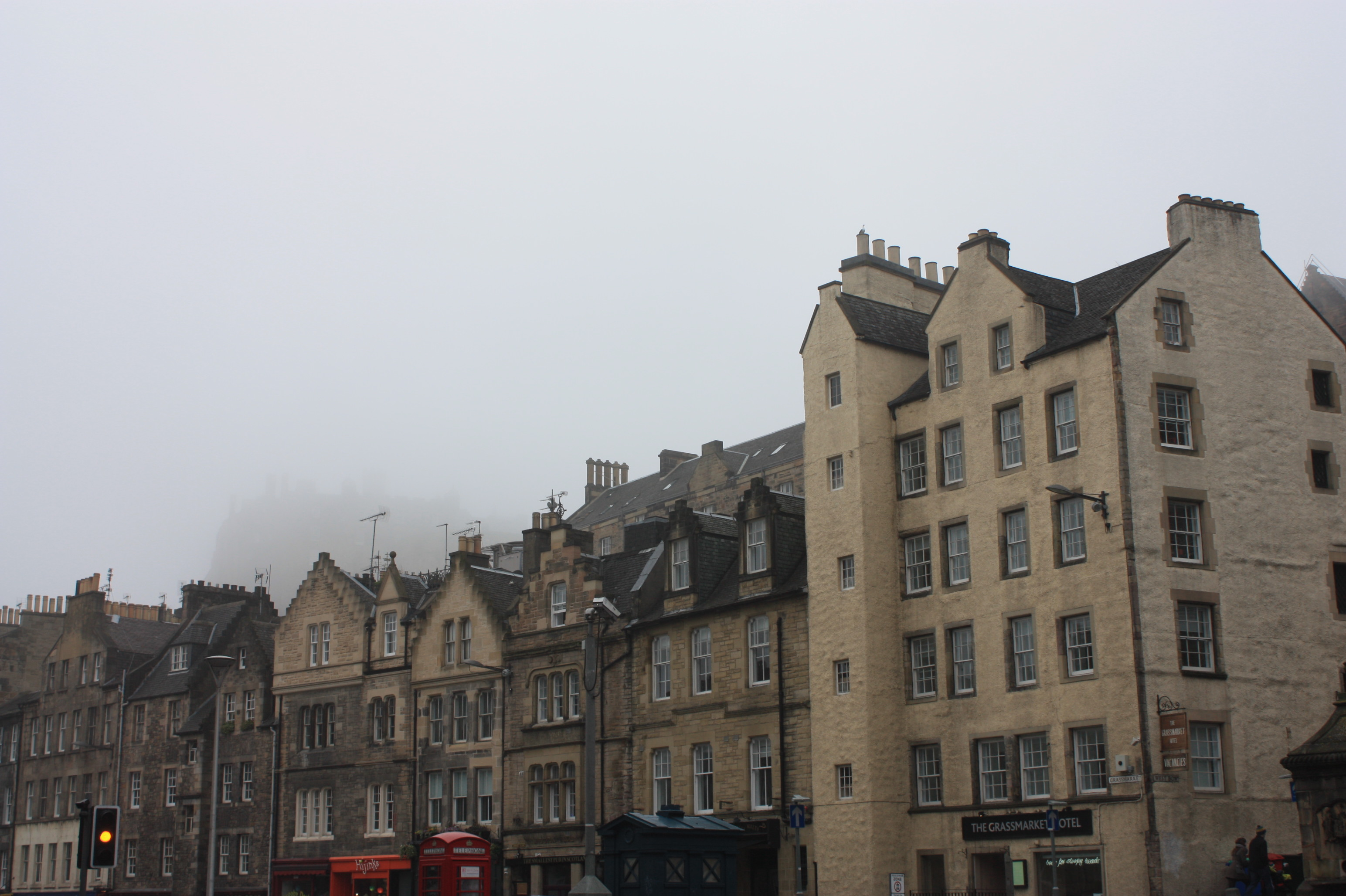
- The square's tenement buildings
- Architectural style: Victorian
- Manager: City of Edinburgh Council
- Location: Edinburgh, Scotland
- Parking: Limited
- Public transit: Edinburgh Waverley
- Interactive map of Grassmarket

The Grassmarket is a historic market place, street and event space in the Old Town of Edinburgh, Scotland. It is located at the south-west foot of the Castle Rock, lying in a valley, considerably below the surrounding area.

== Location ==
The Grassmarket is located at the foot of the Castle Rock, on which Edinburgh Castle stands. It forms part of one of the main east-west routes through the Old Town. It adjoins the Cowgatehead/Cowgate and Candlemaker Row at the east end, the West Bow (the lower end of Victoria Street) in the north-east corner, King's Stables Road to the north-west, and the West Port to the west. Leading off from the south-west corner is the Vennel, on the east side of which can still be seen some of the best surviving parts of the Flodden and Telfer town walls.

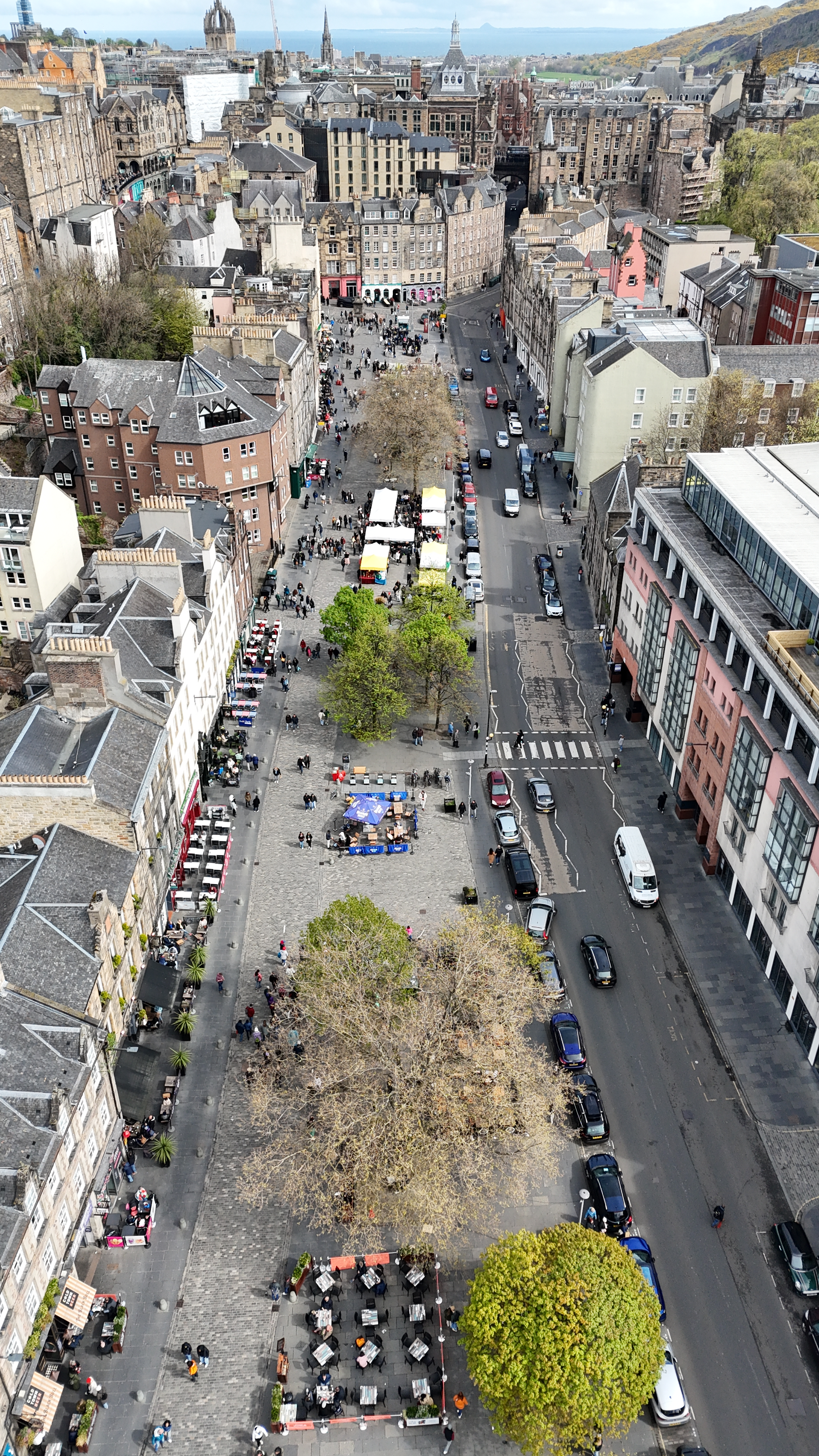
Aerial view of Grassmarket

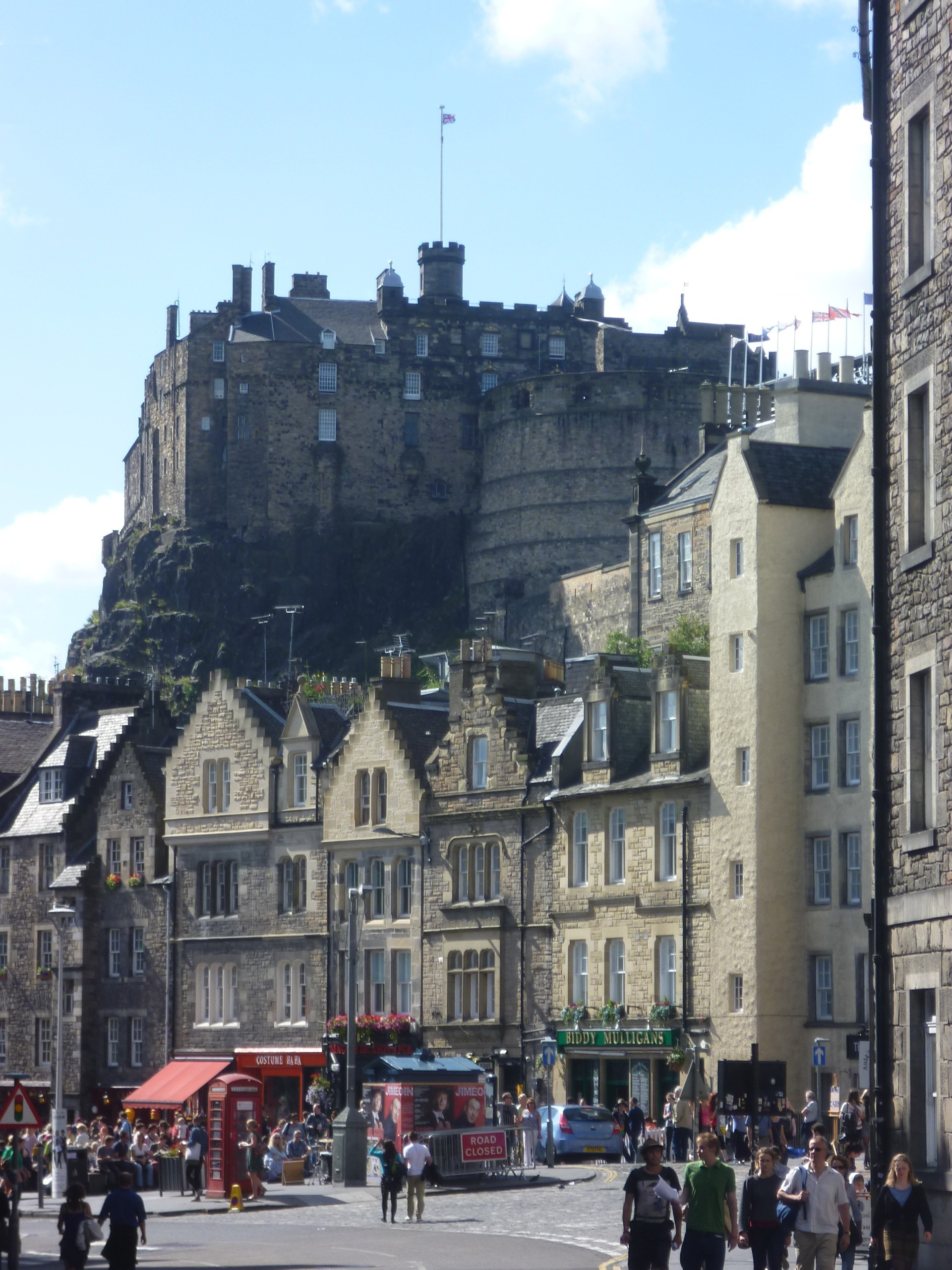
The Grassmarket, with Edinburgh Castle towering above it

The view to the north, dominated by the castle, has long been a favourite subject of painters and photographers.

== History ==
First mentioned in the Registrum Magni Sigilii Regum Scotorum (1363) as "the street called Newbygging [new buildings] under the castle", the Grassmarket was, from 1477, one of Edinburgh's main market places, a part of which was given over to the sale of horses and cattle (the name apparently deriving from livestock grazing in pens beyond its western end).

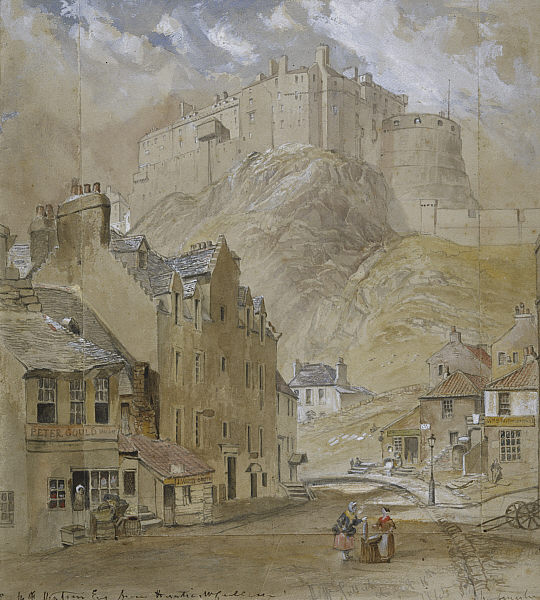
Western end of Grassmarket, painted in 1845

Daniel Defoe, who was sent to Edinburgh as an English government agent in 1706, reported the place being used for two open air markets: the "Grass-market" and the "Horse-market". Of the West Bow at the north-east corner, considerably altered in the Victorian period, he wrote, "This street, which is called the Bow, is generally full of wholesale traders, and those very considerable dealers in iron, pitch, tar, oil, hemp, flax, linseed, painters' colours, dyers, drugs and woods, and such like heavy goods, and supplies country shopkeepers, as our wholesale dealers in England do. And here I may say, is a visible face of trade; most of them have also warehouses in Leith, where they lay up the heavier goods, and bring them hither, or sell them by patterns and samples, as they have occasion."

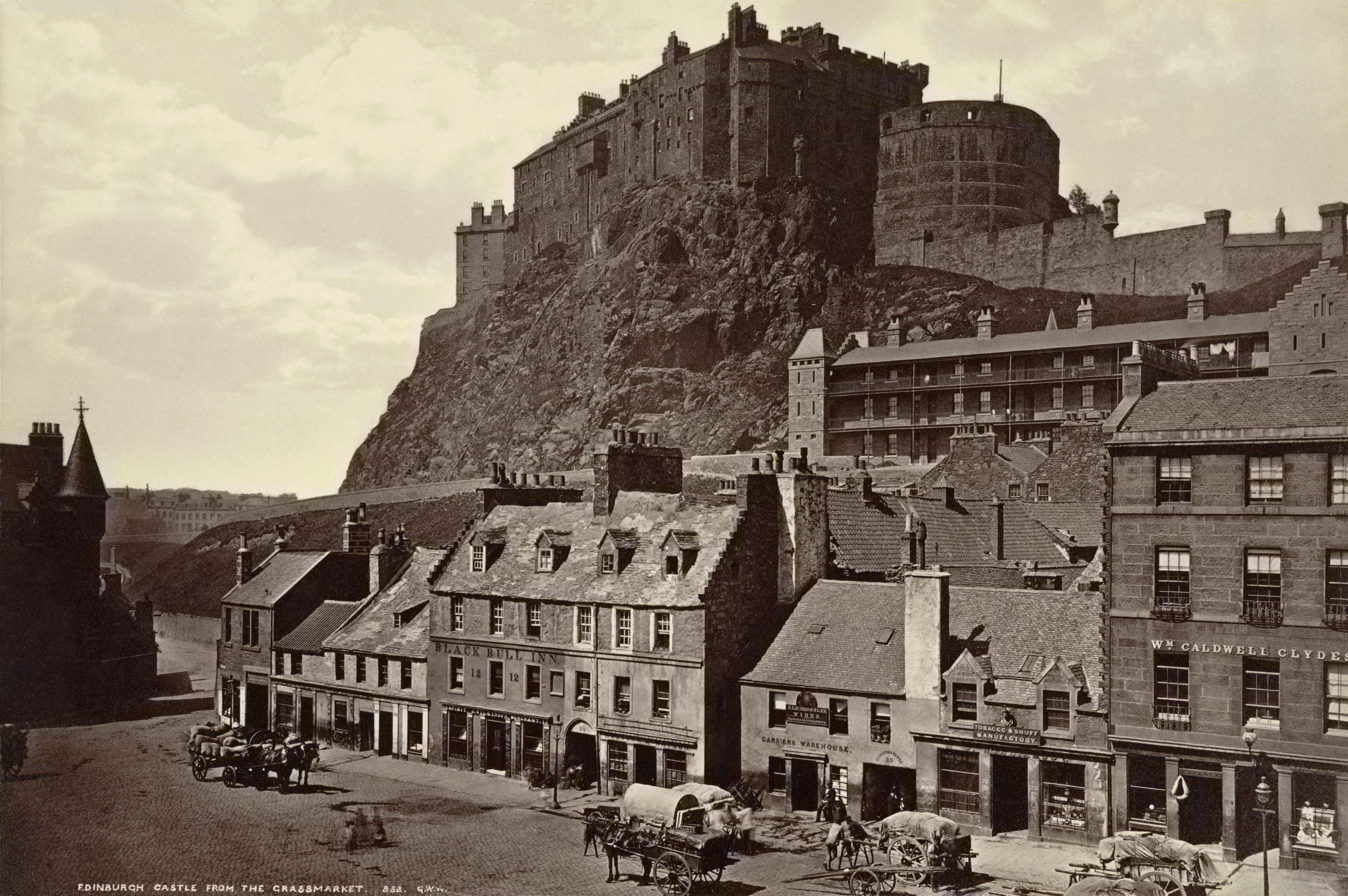
Edinburgh Castle from the Grassmarket, photographed by George Washington Wilson in c. 1875

From 1800 the area attracted a large number of Irish immigrants, and many low-rent lodging houses were established to house them. The popular view of these immigrants was prejudiced by the Burke and Hare murders, most of which took place in Tanners Close at the West Port (the west end of the Grassmarket) in 1828.

From the 1840s, the area was characterised by severe overcrowding, with up to twelve people often living in one room, and occupants being locked in their rooms overnight. Police inspections had begun in 1822 but the rules themselves caused many of the problems. A further act of Parliament, the Edinburgh Police Act 1848 (11 & 12 Vict. c. cxiii) combined police surveillance with limits on occupation. In 1888 the City Public Health Department recorded seven lodging houses holding a total of 414 persons. Crombies Land at the foot of West Port held 70 people in 27 bedrooms, with no toilets

As a gathering point for market traders and cattle drovers, the Grassmarket was traditionally a place of taverns, hostelries and temporary lodgings, a fact still reflected in the use of some of the surrounding buildings. In the late 18th century the fly coach to London, via Dumfries and Carlisle, set out from an inn at the Cowgate Head at the eastern end of the market place. In 1803 William and Dorothy Wordsworth took rooms at the White Hart Inn, where the poet Robert Burns had stayed during his last visit to Edinburgh in 1791. In her account of the visit, Recollections of a Tour Made in Scotland, A. D. 1803, Dorothy described it as "not noisy, and tolerably cheap". In his 1961 film Greyfriars Bobby Walt Disney chose a lodging in the Grassmarket as the place where the Skye terrier's owner dies (depicting him as a shepherd hoping to be hired at the market rather than the real-life dog's owner, police night watchman John Gray).

The meat market closed in 1911 when a new municipal slaughter house at Tollcross replaced the old "shambles" in the western half of the Grassmarket (a road beyond the open market place) which joins King's Stables Road.

The association of the area with the poor and homeless only began to lessen in the 1980s: with Salvation Army hostels at both ends of the Grassmarket. Closure of the female hostel at the junction of West Port and the Grassmarket around 2000 in combination with an overall gentrification, capitalising on the street's location, began to change the atmosphere. Closure of the public toilets at the east end (a focal point for "jakeys" - drunken-down-and-outs) and comprehensive re-landscaping in the beginning of the 21st century has transformed the character of the area.

An inscribed flagstone in the central pavement in front of the White Hart Inn indicates the spot where a bomb exploded during a Zeppelin raid on the city on the night of 2–3 April 1916. Eleven people were killed in the raid, though none at this particular spot.

== Archaeology ==
Archaeological excavations in the 2000s, by Headland Archaeology, on Candlemaker Row, in advance of new development, found that the archaeological evidence matches the historical records for the development of the Grassmarket. Candlemaker Row had activity from the 11th or 12th century onwards, possibly a farmstead, next to the confluence of two major cattle-droving routes into Edinburgh. The area was urbanized in the late 15th century, with the division of the land into burgage-plots and construction of a tenement, at the same time the market place was established in Grassmarket. In 1654, the magistrates designated the street for candle-making, thus how it got its name. The late 18th and early 19th centuries saw the redevelopment of the site and evidence for the use of the area as a brass foundry, in line with the Grassmarket being used as a slum at that time.

== As a place of execution ==
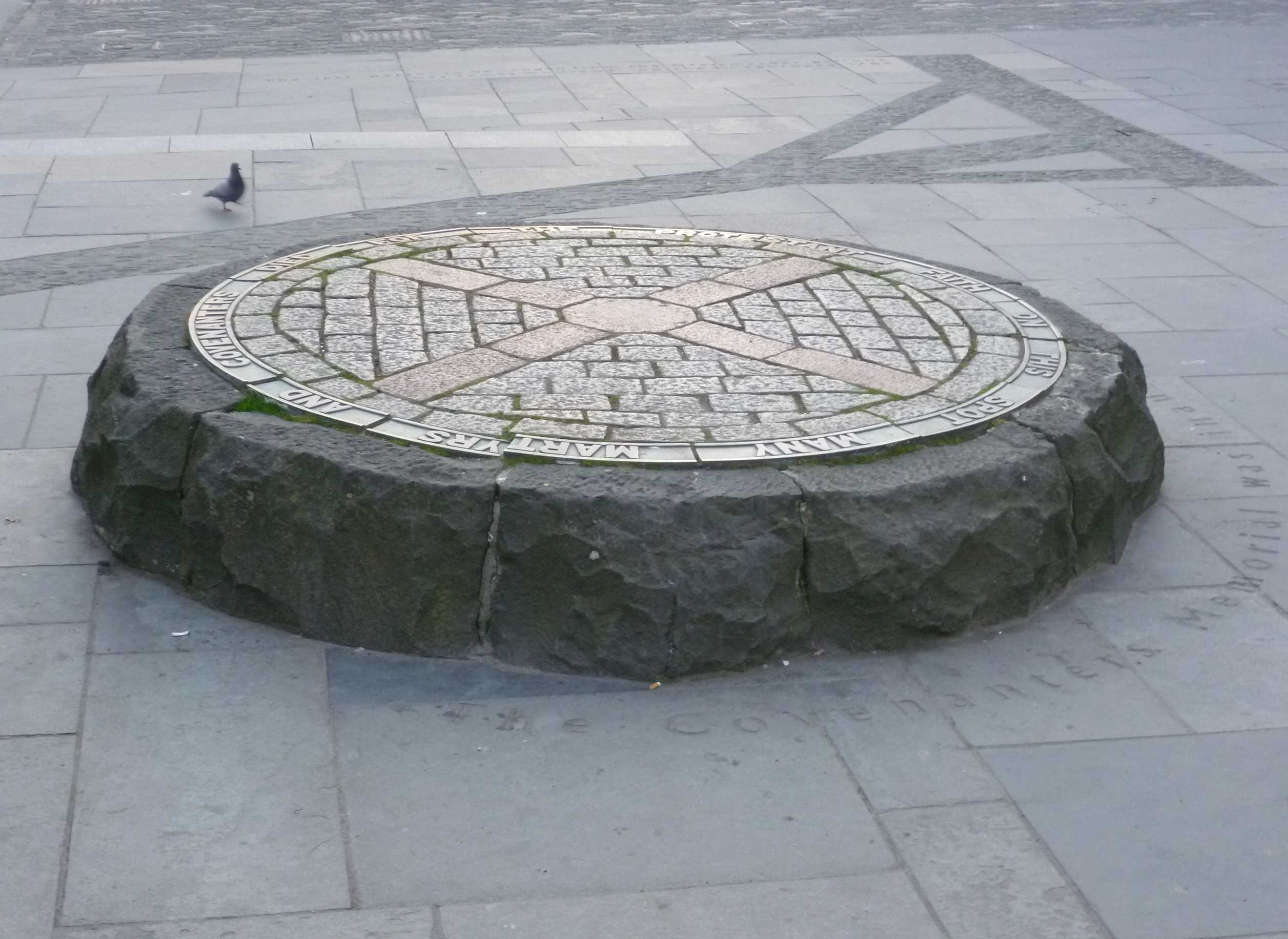
Shadow of the gibbet next to the Covenanters Memorial

The Grassmarket was also a traditional place of public executions.

A memorial near the site once occupied by the gibbet was created by public subscription in 1937. It commemorates over 100 Covenanters who died on the gallows between 1661 and 1688 during the period known as The Killing Time. Their names, where known, are recorded on a nearby plaque. One obdurate prisoner's refusal to escape death by swearing loyalty to the Crown prompted the snide remark by the Duke of Rothes that he had chosen to "glorify God in the Grassmarket".

In 1736, the Grassmarket formed the backdrop to the Porteous Riots which ended in the lynching of a captain of the Town Guard. A plaque near the traditional execution site now marks the spot where an enraged mob brought Captain Porteous's life to a brutal end.

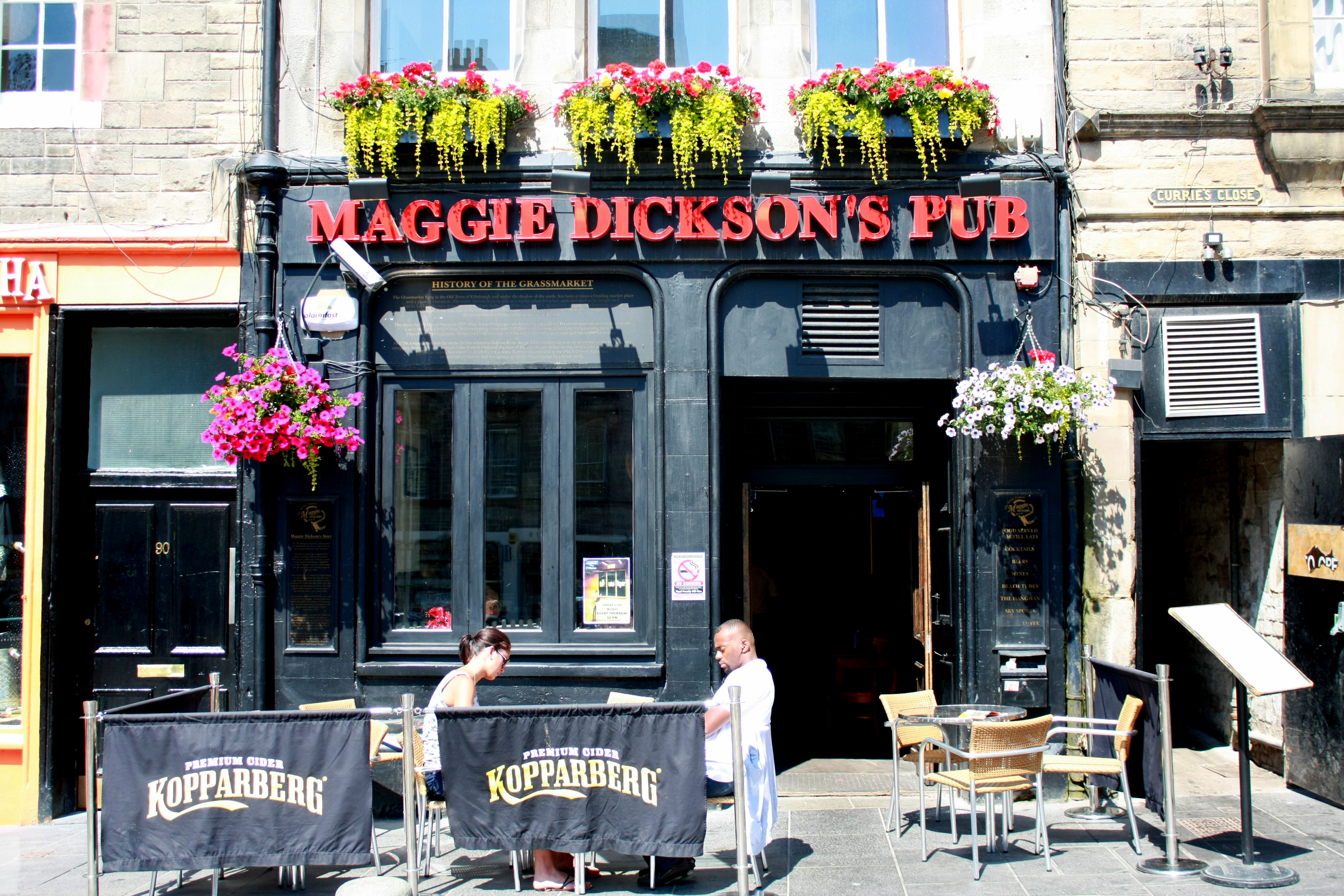
Maggie Dickson's Pub

A popular story in Edinburgh is that of Margaret "Maggie" Dickson, a fishwife from Musselburgh, whose husband left, possibly press-ganged, to join the Royal Navy. Maggie was working in an inn in Kelso while pregnant. Her baby was either still born or died shortly after the birth, and Maggie attempted to hide the body in the river Tweed. The body was discovered and traced back to her. She was taken to Edinburgh and tried and convicted under an act of 1690 for "concealment of pregnancy", a capital offence. She was hanged in the Grassmarket in August 1724, at the age of 22 or 23, by hangman John Dalgliesh. After a scuffle with medical students, who then were only allowed to dissect criminal corpses, the family took her body back to Musselburgh in a cart, but after stopping at an inn (possibly Sheep's Heid Inn, Duddingston) they heard noises from the coffin; Maggie was found to be alive. Under Scots Law, her punishment had been carried out, so she could not be executed a second time for the same crime (only later were the words "until dead" added to the sentence of hanging). Her "resurrection" was also to some extent seen as divine intervention, and so she was allowed to go free. She became known as "half-hangit Maggie" and attracted curiosity as she was seen back in the Grassmarket in October 1724, with an item about a crowd forming to see her in the Scots Magazine. She remarried her husband (as "death" had parted them) and lived another 40 years. There is now a pub in the Grassmarket named Maggie Dickson's near where she was hanged.

In 1775, the young advocate James Boswell's first criminal client, John Reid from Peeblesshire, was hanged in the Grassmarket for sheep-stealing. Boswell, convinced of his client's innocence and citing Maggie Dickson's miraculous recovery, hatched a plan to recover Reid's corpse immediately after execution and have it resuscitated by surgeons. He was finally dissuaded from this course of action by a friend who warned him that the condemned man had become resigned to his fate and might well curse Boswell for bringing him back to life.

Sir Walter Scott described his memory of the Grassmarket gibbet in his novel The Heart of Midlothian published in 1818.

The fatal day was announced to the public, by the appearance of a huge black gallows-tree towards the eastern end of the Grassmarket. This ill-omened apparition was of great height, with a scaffold surrounding it, and a double ladder placed against it, for the ascent of the unhappy criminal and the executioner. As this apparatus was always arranged before dawn, it seemed as if the gallows had grown out of the earth in the course of one night, like the production of some foul demon; and I well remember the fright with which the schoolboys, when I was one of their number, used to regard these ominous signs of deadly preparation. On the night after the execution the gallows again disappeared, and was conveyed in silence and darkness to the place where it was usually deposited, which was one of the vaults under the Parliament House, or courts of justice."

== Architecture ==
The old market area is surrounded by pubs, restaurants, clubs, local retail shops, and two large Apex Hotels.

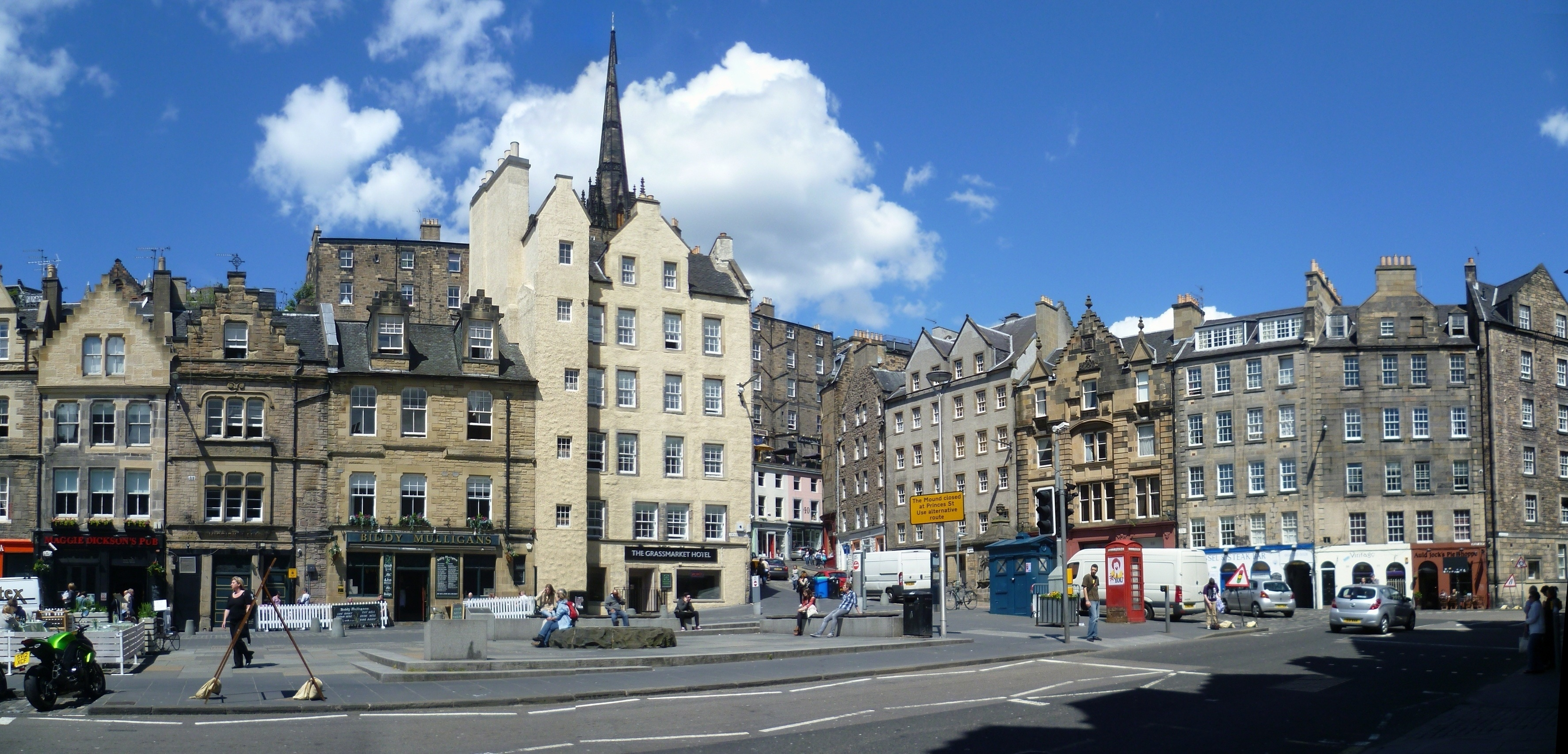
North-east corner of the Grassmarket. Until 1764 public hangings took place on a spot just to the left of the yellow traffic sign. Thereafter, they were carried out at the Old Tolbooth in the High Street and then at the Lawnmarket.

The building dates range from 17th century to 21st century. The White Hart Inn dates from the early 18th Century and claims to be the oldest public house in Edinburgh and is said to have been visited by Robert Burns (1759–96), the Wordsworths (1803), William Burke and William Hare in the late 1820s.

The City Improvement Scheme of 1868 cleared many of the slums and widened streets such as West Port, and the western group of buildings all derive from this plan. A further improvement plan in the 1920s by the City architect Ebenezer MacRae skilfully closed many of the gaps with faux Scots Baronial blocks, ironically all built as council housing.

There are several modern buildings on its southern side. Some properties were used by Heriot-Watt University, and its predecessor college, for teaching and research until the university moved fully to its new Riccarton campus (1974–92). The Mountbatten Building of Heriot-Watt University was built in 1968) for the departments of electrical engineering, management and languages. The Mountbatten building was converted and reopened as the Apex International Hotel in 1996.

An example of 21st century architecture is Dance Base (2001) by Malcolm Fraser Architects, the Scottish National Centre for Dance, which runs back from a traditional frontage to a multi-level design on the slopes of the Castle Rock; the design won a Civic Trust Award and Scottish Design Award in 2002.

== Modern developments ==
For most of its history the Grassmarket was one of the poorest areas of the city, associated in the nineteenth century with an influx of poor Irish and the infamous murderers Burke and Hare. Up until quite recently it was still to some extent associated with homelessness and drunkenness before its rapid gentrification as a popular tourist spot. The character of the area was reflected in a number of hostels for the homeless, including that of the Salvation Army Women's Hostel (now a backpackers hostel) which existed here until the 1980s. From then on property prices started to rise sharply.

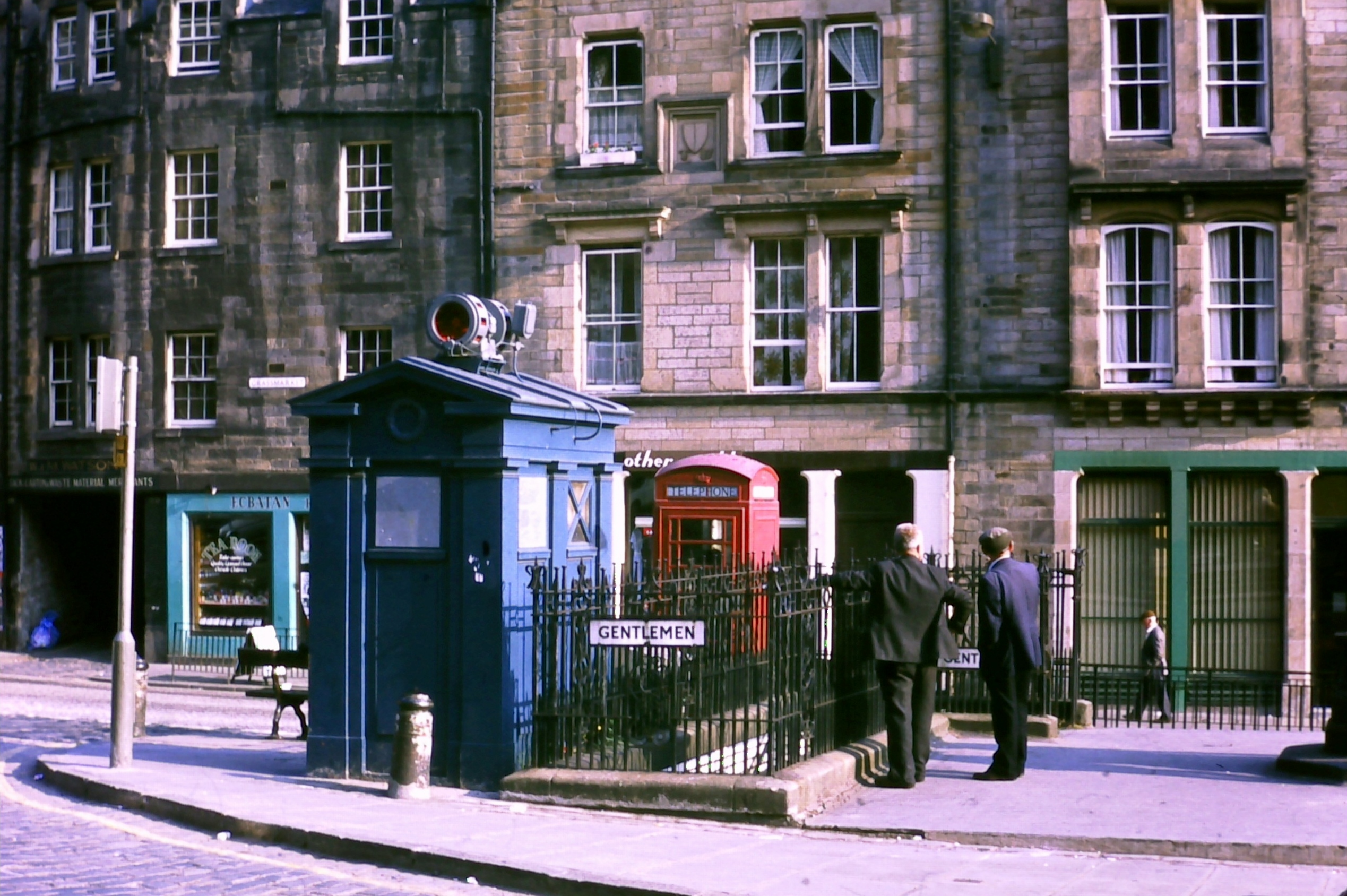
A view of the Grassmarket before its gradual rejuvenation and gentrification in the 1980s

The area is, and always has been, dominated by a series of public houses. In recent years many have become more family-friendly and include dining areas. The council has recently further encouraged these to spill over onto outside pavements, giving the place a more Continental atmosphere.

The Grassmarket was subject to a streetscape improvement scheme carried out 2009–10 at a cost of £5 million. Measures aimed at making the area more pedestrian-friendly included the extension of pavement café areas and the creation of an "events zone".

The "shadow" of a gibbet was added in dark paving on the former gallows site (next to the Covenanters' Monument) and the line of the Flodden Wall at the western end delineated by a strip of lighter paving from the Vennel on the south side to the newly created Granny's Green Steps on the north side.
