= Effie Deans (painting) =

Painting by James McNeill Whistler

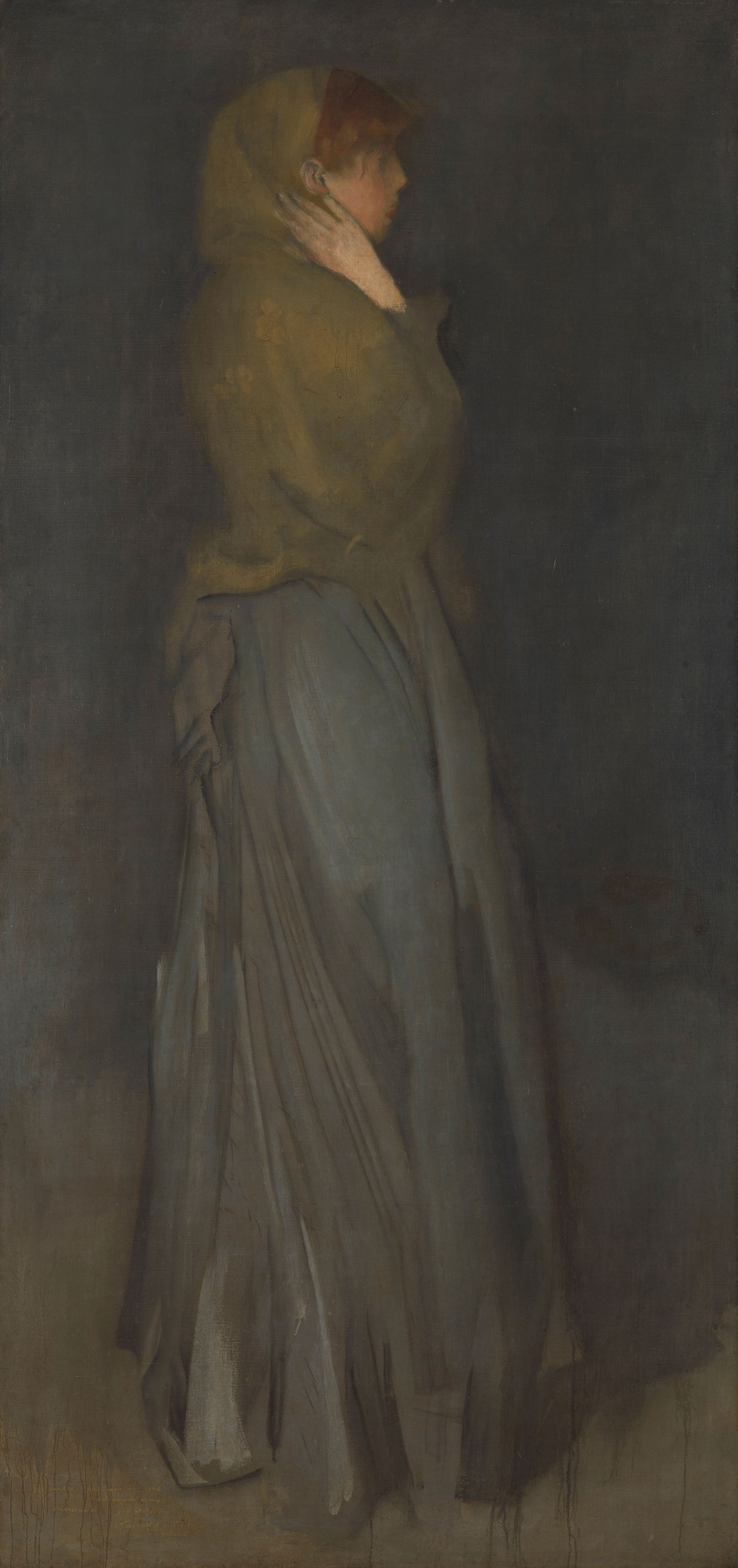
- Artist: James McNeill Whistler
- Year: 1876–1878
- Type: Oil on canvas, portrait painting
- Dimensions: 194 cm × 93 cm (76 in × 37 in)
- Location: Rijksmuseum, Amsterdam

Effie Deans or Arrangement in Yellow and Grey: Effie Deans is a c.1878 oil painting by the Anglo-American artist James McNeill Whistler. It shows a young woman, intended to represent the character of Effie Deans from Walter Scott's 1818 novel The Heart of Midlothian. It features Whistler's frequent model Maud Franklin.

Produced around the time of Whistler's famous court case against John Ruskin, it was sold off to help pay for the heavy legal costs Whistler had incurred when suing the art critic for libel. It is today in the collection of the Rijksmuseum in Amsterdam.

== See also ==
- List of paintings by James McNeill Whistler

== Bibliography ==
- Corn, Wanda M. (ed.) Like Breath on Glass: Whistler, Inness, and the Art of Painting Softly. Sterling and Francine Clark Art Institute, 2008.
- Jacobi, Carol (ed.) James McNeill Whistler. Tate Publishing, 2026.
- Sutherland, Daniel E. Whistler: A Life for Art's Sake. Yale University Press, 2014.
