= James Drummond (artist) =

Scottish artist and photographer

James Drummond RSA
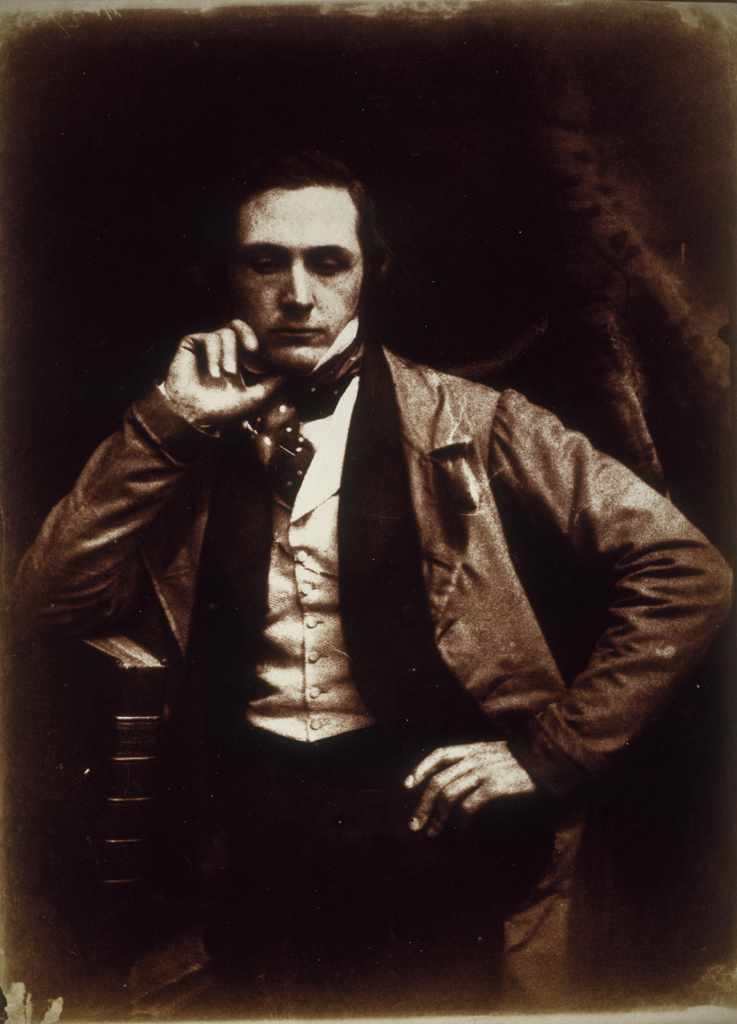
- James Drummond, circa 1845, by Hill & Adamson.
- Born: 1 September 1816; Edinburgh, Scotland
- Died: 12 August 1877 (aged 60); Edinburgh, Scotland

James Drummond RSA FSA (1 September 1816 – 12 August 1877) was an artist and the curator of the National Gallery of Scotland from 1868 to 1877. He was also an early photographer.

== Life ==
He was born in 1816, in John Knox House in the Royal Mile, Edinburgh.

He studied at the Trustees Academy in Edinburgh under Sir William Allan.

He was a member of the Photographic Society of Scotland and was photographed by Hill & Adamson around 1843. He was also a member of the Society of Antiquaries of Scotland. In November 1876 he is listed as their Curator of the Museum, along with Robert Carfrae.

He produced a series of drawings of buildings in the Old Town later reproduced as lithographs.

In his later life he lived at 8 Royal Crescent in the New Town of Edinburgh.

== Works ==
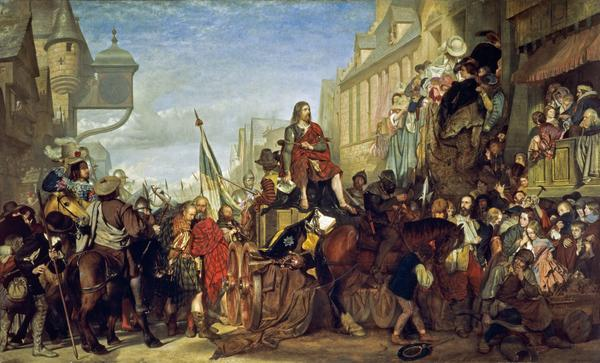
Montrose paraded on the Royal Mile.

Drummond specialised in historical recreations and imaginary reconstructions of past events such as:

- The Porteous Mob
- Montrose paraded on the Royal Mile
- The Return of Mary Queen of Scots to Edinburgh
- Portrait of Baroness Burdett-Coutts and her Companion Mrs Brown in Edinburgh (1874)
- The Pipe-Smoker
- Queen Mary's Last Look
- Ancient Scottish Weapons (portfolio series)
- Fisherman Drawing on his Pipe
- The Fiery Cross
- Old Salty (1841)
- The Departure of the Bride
- Border Reivers
- Portrait of Robert Burns
- Old Edinburgh (portfolio series)
- The Old Fisherman
- gravestone for Alexander Smith (poet)
