= Heart of Midlothian (Royal Mile) =

Mosaic in Edinburgh, Scotland

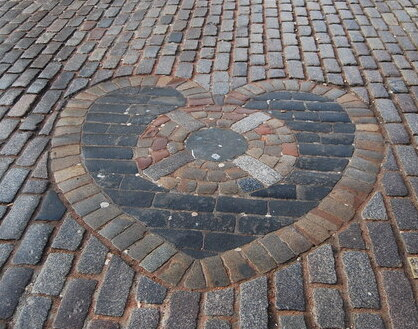

- Location within Edinburgh
- Year: 1860
- Medium: Mosaic made with coloured granite setts
- Location: Edinburgh, Scotland; 55.9495542°N 3.1916978°W

The Heart of Midlothian is a heart-shaped mosaic, formed of coloured granite setts, located outside St Giles' Cathedral in Edinburgh. It marks the site of the entrance to Edinburgh's Old Tolbooth, which was demolished in 1817. Sir Walter Scott would immortalise the Tolbooth in his 1818 novel The Heart of Midlothian, which centres on a girl who is wrongfully imprisoned there. The mosaic has marked the former Tolbooth's location since 1860.

Locals will often spit upon the heart, an action which is said to bring good luck, although it may have originated as a sign of disdain for the executions that took place in the Tolbooth. The Edinburgh football club Heart of Midlothian F.C. takes its name and crest from the mosaic.
