= The Heart of Midlothian =

1818 novel by Walter Scott

The Heart of Mid-Lothian
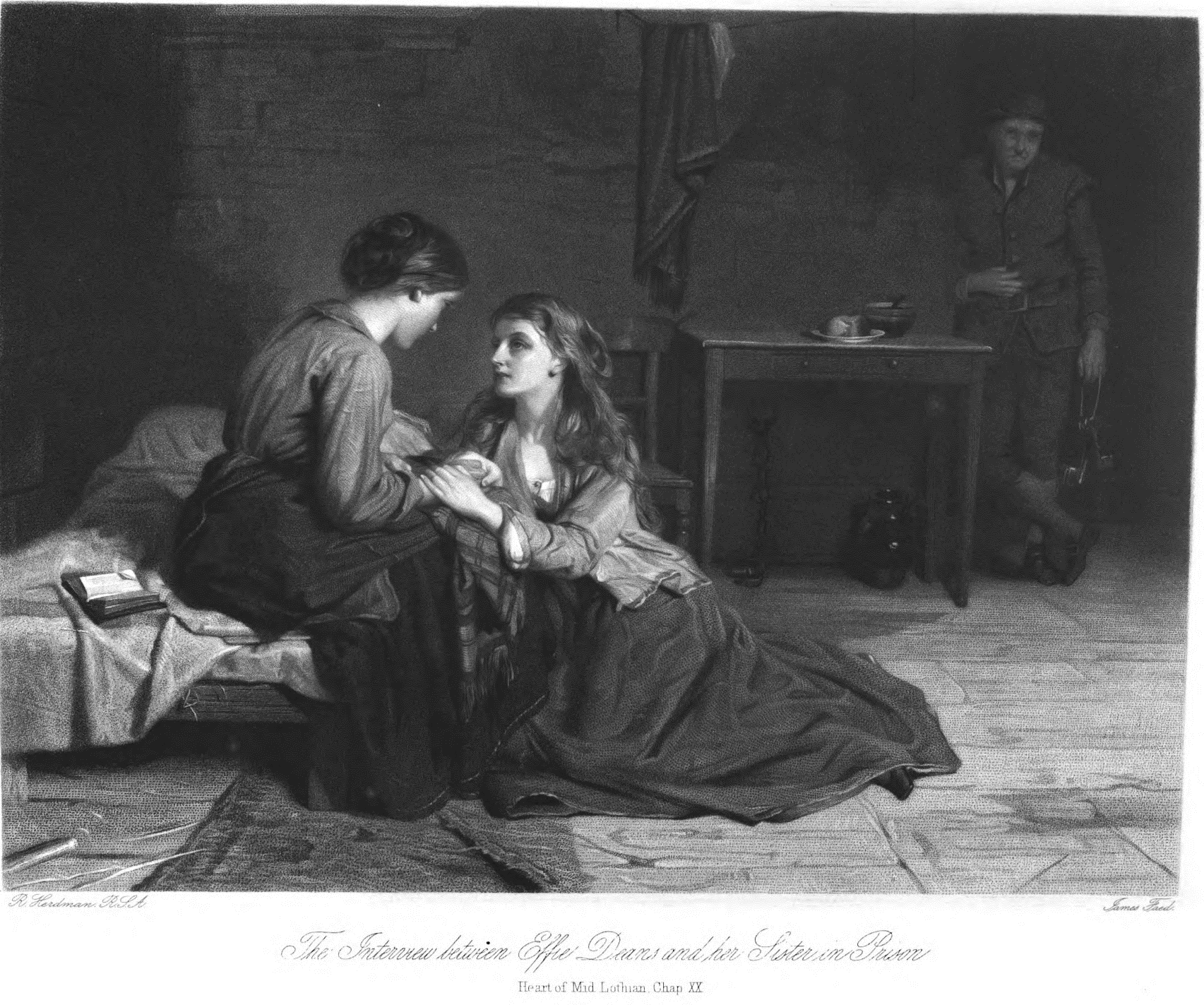
- Effie and Jeanie Deans embracing by Robert Herdman (1873)
- Author: Walter Scott
- Language: English, Lowland Scots
- Series: Waverley Novels; Tales of my Landlord, Second Series
- Genre: Historical novel
- Publication date: 25 July 1818
- Publication place: Scotland
- Media type: Print
- Pages: 469 (Edinburgh Edition, 2004)
- Preceded by: Rob Roy
- Followed by: The Bride of Lammermoor and A Legend of Montrose (Tales of My Landlord, Third series)

The Heart of Mid-Lothian is the seventh of Sir Walter Scott's Waverley Novels. It was originally published in four volumes on 25 July 1818, under the title of Tales of My Landlord, 2nd series, and the author was given as "Jedediah Cleishbotham, Schoolmaster and Parish-clerk of Gandercleugh". The main action, which takes place between September 1736 and May 1737, is set in motion by the Porteous Riots in Edinburgh and involves an epic journey from Edinburgh to London by a working-class girl to obtain a royal commutation of the death penalty incurred by her sister for the alleged murder of her new-born baby. Despite some negative contemporary reviews, some now consider it Scott's best novel.

== Composition and sources ==
Scott signed the contract for a second series of Tales of my Landlord with Archibald Constable on 25 November 1817. He had the conception of The Heart of Mid-Lothian in his head by that date, and indeed it is possible that he had already produced the introductory chapter as early as April that year, but the main writing was done between January and July 1818. The original intention had been that The Heart of Mid-Lothian would occupy three of the four volumes and another tale the fourth, but at some stage during composition Scott decided that Mid-Lothian should be a four-volume work.

For the Porteous Riot in the first part of the novel Scott was able to draw on the extensive records of criminal trials arising from it, and these were published simultaneously with the novel as Criminal Trials, Illustrative of the Tale Entitled "The Heart of Mid-Lothian," Published from the Original Record. The central business of Jeanie and Effie Deans was suggested by a true story sent (anonymously) by Mrs Helen Goldie of Dumfries. Both the riot and the story of the sisters were radically reworked by Scott for his fictional purposes. For David Deans's rhetoric Scott drew extensively on the Covenanting lives by Patrick Walker (c. 1666–1745), and for English dialect he owed much to two compilations by Francis Grose: A Classical Dictionary of the Vulgar Tongue, of which he owned the third edition (1796) and A Provincial Glossary (1787).

== Editions ==
The first edition, in four volumes, was published by Archibald Constable in Edinburgh on 25 July 1818 and became available in London on the 28th. As with all the Waverley novels before 1827 publication was anonymous. The print run was 10,000 and the price £1 12s (£1.60). It is possible that Scott had some input into the text of this novel in the 1823 Novels and Tales, but the evidence is not strong. In the second half of 1829, though, he revised the text, concentrating on the first half of the work, for the 'Magnum' edition and provided notes and an introduction: it appeared as part of Volume 11, all of Volume 12, and part of Volume 13 in April, May, and June 1830.

The standard modern edition, by David Hewitt and Alison Lumsden, was published as Volume 6 of the Edinburgh Edition of the Waverley Novels in 2004: this is based on the first edition with emendations principally from Scott's manuscript; the new Magnum material is included in Volume 25a.

== Plot summary ==
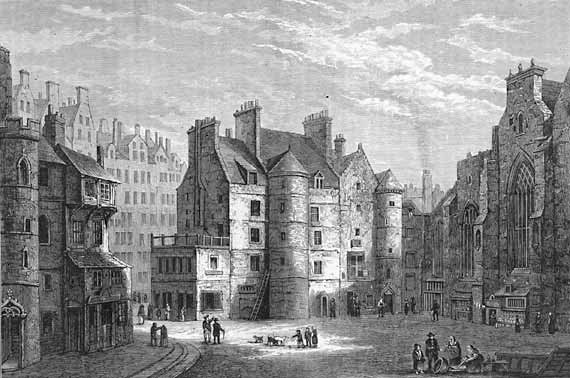
The Old Tolbooth, Edinburgh

The title of the book refers to the Old Tolbooth prison in Edinburgh, Scotland, at the time in the heart of the Scottish county of Midlothian. The historical backdrop was the event known as the Porteous riots. In 1736, a riot broke out in Edinburgh over the execution of two smugglers. The Captain of the City Guards, Captain John Porteous, ordered the soldiers to fire into the crowd, killing several people. Porteous was later killed by a lynch mob who stormed the Old Tolbooth.

The second, and main element of the novel was based on a story Scott claimed to have received in an unsigned letter. It was about a certain Helen Walker who had travelled all the way to London by foot, to receive a royal pardon for her sister, who was unjustly charged with infanticide. Scott put Jeanie Deans in the place of Walker, a young woman from a family of highly devout Presbyterians. Jeanie goes to London, partly by foot, hoping to achieve an audience with the Queen through the influence of the Duke of Argyll.

The novel portrays the contrasting fortunes of two sisters: Jeanie and Effie Deans. In volume 1, Captain Porteous is initially condemned for murder, but is reprieved at the last moment. A young nobleman George Staunton (under the guise of "Geordie Robertson") leads a mob that storms the prison and lynches Porteous. Staunton also attempts to free his lover Effie Deans, whom he impregnated. She has been imprisoned for the alleged murder of her baby but she refuses as to escape would be to admit guilt. Reuben Butler, a young minister who is in love with Jeanie, witnesses Effie's refusal to escape. This fact strengthens Jeanie's belief that her sister is innocent.

Volume 2 covers the trial of Effie, where she is unable to prove her innocence as she cannot produce the baby and had hid the pregnancy from her family. Jeanie is unable to lie in court to save her sister, and Effie is sentenced to death.

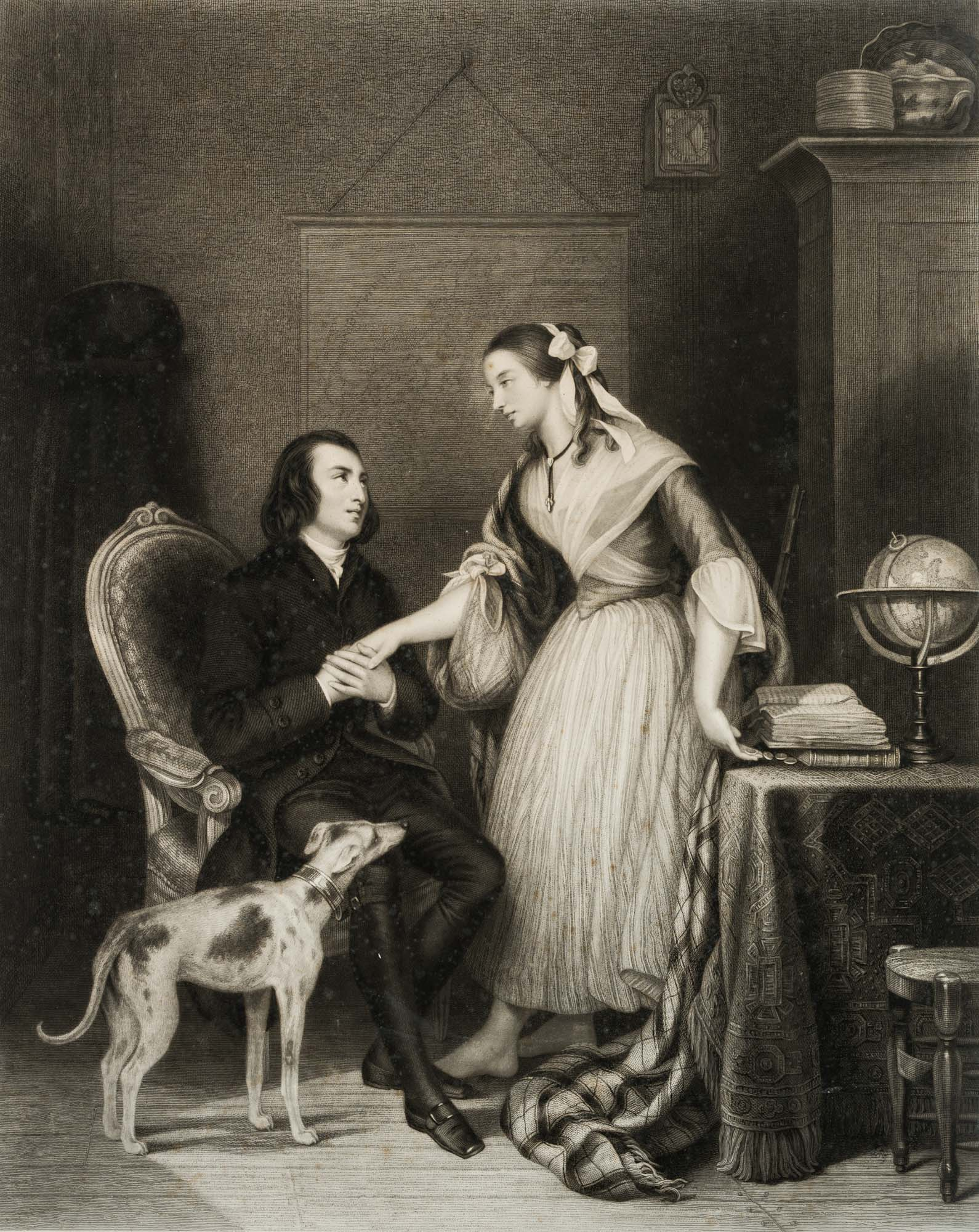
Jeanie Deans at Reuben Butler's home, aquatinta by George Maile after Anna Rimbaut-Borrel, 1841

In volume 3, Jeanie decides to walk to London to beg a royal pardon. Butler is unable to convince her to stay, and eventually contacts the Duke of Argyle, who may owe his family a favour, asking for help. On her way, Jeanie is waylaid by Madge Wildfire and her mother Meg Murdockson. Jeanie learns that they stole the baby out of jealousy of Effie's relationship with Staunton. Meg attempts to murder Jeanie, but the latter escapes. In London, the Duke of Argyle, impressed with Jeanie's fervor, arranges an audience with Queen Caroline. The Queen is so touched by Jeanie's eloquence and grace that she convinces the King to grant the pardon and Effie is freed. Jeanie returns to Scotland, her father is given land to superintend by the Duke, and Butler receives a promotion which comes with a large increase in income.

Jeanie later marries Butler in volume 4, and they live happily on the estate of the Duke of Argyle. Effie reveals that the son was not murdered but sold to a work gang by Meg, and that Staunton is in fact the criminal Robertson. Effie marries Staunton. The long-lost son, who has been raised as a violent criminal, travels to Scotland and murders Staunton, before escaping to America to live with Native Americans. Effie finally decides to travel to France and become a nun, which requires a conversion to Catholicism, which surprises Jeanie.

== Analysis ==
Jeanie Deans is the first woman among Scott's protagonists, and also the first to come from the lower classes. While the heroine is idealised for her religious devotion and her moral rectitude, Scott nevertheless ridicules the moral certitude represented by the branch of Presbyterianism known as Cameronians, represented in the novel by Jeanie's father David. Also central to the novel is the early-18th-century Jacobitism, a theme found in so many of Scott's novels. Scott's sympathies can be seen in the ideal figure of the Duke of Argyll, a moderate on these issues.

== Characters ==
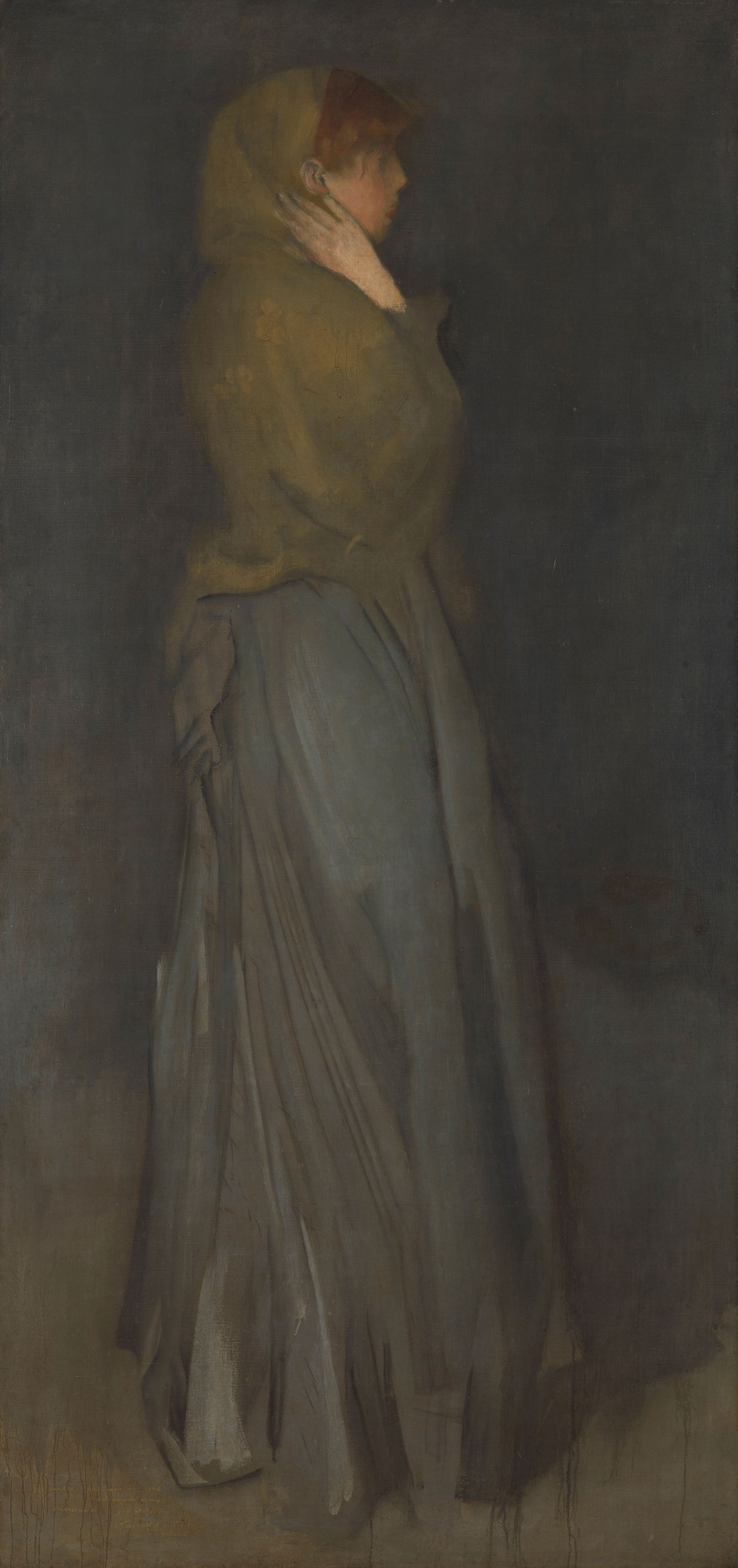
Effie Deans by James McNeill Whistler, 1878

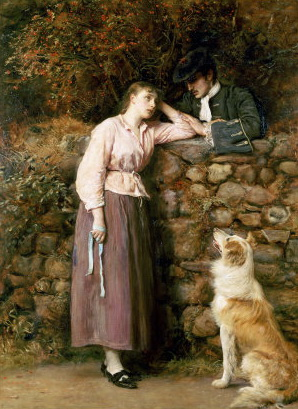
Effie Deans by John Everett Millais

principal characters in bold

- Captain Porteous, officer of the Edinburgh city guard
- **David Deans**, a dairy-farmer
- **Jeanie Deans**, later Butler, his older daughter
- **Effie Deans**, later Lady Staunton, his younger daughter
- **The Whistler**, Effie's son
- David Deans, Jeanie's eldest child
- The Laird of Dumbiedikes, Jeanie's admirer
- **Reuben Butler**, a schoolmaster
- Bartoline Saddletree, a harness-maker
- Mrs Saddletree, his wife
- Rev. Robert Staunton, Rector of Willingham
- **George Staunton**, alias Robertson, his son
- Andrew Wilson, a smuggler, his companion
- **Meg Murdockson**, George's nurse
- **Madge Wildfire**, her crazy daughter
- Gideon Sharpitlaw, procurator fiscal
- Jim Ratcliffe, a criminal turned jailor
- Baillie Middleburgh, a magistrate
- Mr Fairbrother, counsel for Effie
- Mrs Bickerton, landlady of the 'Seven Stars' at York
- Mrs Glass, a tobacconist
- **MacCallum More, Duke of Argyle**
- Mr Archibald, his groom of the chamber
- **Queen Caroline**
- The Countess of Suffolk
- Mrs Dutton, a dairywoman
- **Duncan Knock, Captain of Knockdunder**
- Donacha Dhu na Dunaigh, a Highland robber

== Chapter summary ==
The chapter numbering follows the Edinburgh Edition where Chapter 18 is divided in two. The numbering in other editions is given in square brackets.

Volume One

Address by Jedidiah Cleishbotham, thanking his readers for their patronage and asserting his theological impartiality, being of Quaker descent.

Ch. 1 Being Introductory: Peter Pattieson derives material for the present narrative from the conversation of two Edinburgh lawyers and one of their clients after their coach is upset at Gandercleugh.

Ch. 2: Andrew Wilson and George Robertson, condemned to death for robbing a customs officer, attend worship at the Tolbooth Church, where Wilson facilitates his companion's escape.

Ch. 3: Captain Porteous fires on the crowd after Wilson's execution and is condemned to death.

Ch. 4: The Edinburgh citizens react unfavourably to Porteous's temporary reprieve at the pleasure of Queen Caroline, acting as regent during George II's absence on the Continent.

Ch. 5: Reuben Butler is upset to learn from Bartoline Saddletree and his wife that Effie Deans is accused of the presumptive murder of her baby.

Ch. 6: Butler is compelled to join the mob storming the Tolbooth where Porteous is held.

Ch. 7: One of the assailants [Robertson] urges Effie to flee the Tolbooth, but she declines to do so. Porteous is executed by the mob.

Ch. 8: While Butler is composing his spirits by walking beneath Salusbury Crags, the narrator devotes three chapters to filling in the family history. The Deans and Butler families were both threatened with eviction by the old Laird of Dumbiedikes but reprieved by his son following his father's deathbed change of heart.

Ch. 9: Butler and Jeanie grew up together. Jeanie was sluggishly courted by the young Dumbiedikes.

Ch. 10: After her mother's death and the family's move to Saint Leonard's Crags, Effie became Mrs Saddletree's servant and was arrested for presumptive child murder.

Ch. 11: Encountering Robertson in the King's Park, Butler is told to summon Jeanie to meet him at Nichol Muschat's Cairn.

Ch. 12: Butler comforts Deans, as does Saddletree with less effect. He passes on Robertson's message and is annoyed at Jeanie's secrecy on the matter. Deans, Saddletree, Dumbiedikes, and Butler set about investigating the evidence and making arrangements for Effie's representation.

Ch. 13: Butler is arrested and examined in connection with the Porteous affair.

Volume Two

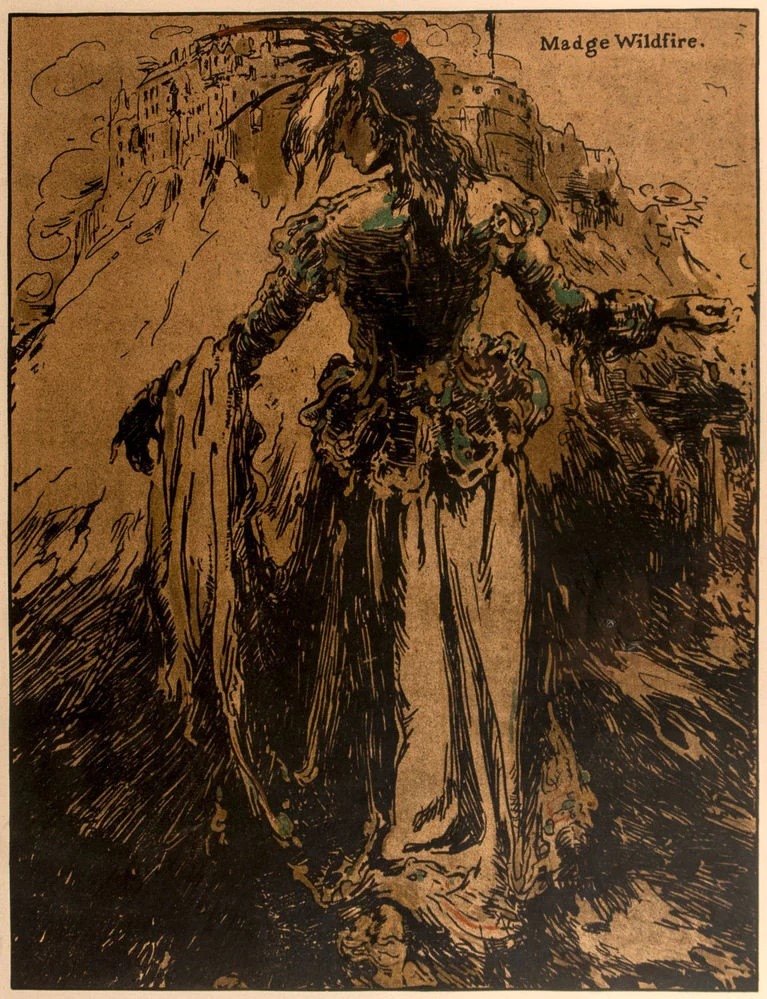
William Nicholson (1872-1949) lithograph from "Characters of Romance" set, 1900, Madge Wildfire

Ch. 1 (14): After family devotions Jeanie sets out for the meeting at the cairn.

Ch. 2 (15): Robertson presses Jeanie to save Effie by lying in court.

Ch. 3 (16): Jim Ratcliffe, onetime criminal, interrogates Madge Wildfire, who says that Robertson wore her clothes during the Porteous riot.

Ch. 4 (17): Gideon Sharpitlaw, the procurator fiscal, ascertains from Effie that Robertson was the father of her child. Robertson escapes a party seeking to arrest him at the cairn after a warning song by Madge.

Ch. 5 (18): Jeanie also escapes the search party. Baillie Middleburgh receives an anonymous letter from Robertson indicating that Jeanie has it in her power to save her sister. Meg Murdockson comes to fetch her daughter Madge.

Ch. 6 (19 [18 ctd]): After some weeks Middleburgh visits Deans, who decides to leave the decision whether or not to appear at Effie's trial to Jeanie.

Ch. 7 (20 [19]): Jeanie misunderstands her father's words, believing that he is leaving it to her to decide whether or not to lie to save her sister.

Ch. 8 (21 [20]): Jeanie visits Effie in prison.

Ch. 9 (22 [21]): Deans and his daughter make their way to the court.

Ch. 10 (23 [22]): The preliminary hearing.

Ch. 11 (24 [23]): The trial.

Ch. 12 (25 [24]): Effie is found guilty and sentenced to death. The citizens comment on the proceedings.

Ch. 13 (26 [25]): Prompted by Mrs Saddletree's reference to the royal prerogative to grant pardons, Jeanie prepares to make the journey to London.

Volume Three

Ch. 1 (27 [26]): Dumbiedikes supplies Jeanie with money.

Ch. 2 (28 [27]): Jeanie says goodbye to Butler after the intrusive Saddletree has made his exit.

Ch. 3 (29 [28]): Jeanie arrives at York and writes letters to her father and Butler.

Ch. 4 (30 [29]): Jeanie is taken captive by two ruffians, accompanied by Madge Wildfire and her mother Meg.

Ch. 5 (31 [30]): Jeanie overhears Meg telling of Robertson's seduction of Madge, who relates some of her story to Jeanie.

Ch. 6 (32 [31]): Madge takes Jeanie to a church service at Willingham.

Ch. 7 (33 [32]): The rector, Mr Staunton (father of George, alias Robertson) is sympathetic to Jeanie.

Ch. 8 (34 [33]): George Staunton tells Jeanie his story.

Ch. 9 (35 [34]): After an initially difficult conversation with George and his father, Jeanie leaves the rectory and receives a letter from George authorising her, if necessary, to use him as a bargaining counter in London. Her peasant guide fills in the family background before she completes her journey by coach.

Ch. 10 (36 [35]): Jeanie has an interview with the Duke of Argyle.

Ch. 11 (37 [36]): Jeanie fends off the enquiries of Mrs Glass, with whom she is staying. Argyle conducts her to Windsor.

Ch. 12 (38 [37]): Jeanie has an interview with the Queen, who agrees to intercede with the King for Effie.

Volume Four

Ch. 1 (39 [38]): Jeanie promises to send Argyle a cheese of her own manufacture. She fends off more of Mrs Glass's enquiries.

Ch. 2 (40 [39]): Jeanie writes letters with news of the pardon to Staunton, Butler, and Deans, and receives a reply from her father.

Ch. 3 (41 [40]): Journeying north with the Argyle family Jeanie witnesses at Carlisle Meg being hanged and Madge's death after being ducked by a mob.

Ch. 4 (42 [41]): Jeanie and the Argyle party arrive at Roseneath.

Ch. 5 (43 [42]): Jeanie is reunited with her father.

Ch. 6 (44 [43]): Deans convinces himself that it is in order for Butler to accept the position of minister at Knocktarlitie and takes it on himself to inform him of his preferment.

Ch. 7 (45 [44]): Jeanie and Butler are reunited. In a letter Effie says she is intending to make a new life abroad. The Captain of Knockdunder, a local laird, is introduced.

Ch. 8 (46 [45]): Butler is inducted to Knocktarlitie.

Ch. 9 (47 [46]): After the post-induction feast Effie and Staunton, now married, visit Jeanie in secret and confirm their intention to spend some years abroad.

Ch. 10 (48 [47]): Jeanie and Butler marry and have three children. Her happiness is marred only by theological disagreements between her father and her husband, and by the lack of news of Effie.

Ch. 11 (49 [48]): Jeanie receives a letter from Effie, now with a place in polite English society as Lady Staunton, and enclosing the first of a series of twice-yearly remittances. On a visit to the manse Argyle sings the praises of Lady Staunton, ignorant of her identity.

Ch. 12 (50 [49]): In 1751 Deans dies. Jeanie gives Butler money to buy a small estate.

Ch. 13 (51 [50]): Jeanie forwards to her sister a copy of Meg's dying confession, received by chance, indicating that the baby son resulting from her relationship with Staunton was not killed. Lady Staunton arrives at the manse: on a mountain excursion with her elder nephew David she is rescued by a wild lad, who is later identified as the Whistler, Effie's son.

Ch. 14 (52 [51]): At the General Assembly of the Church of Scotland in Edinburgh, Butler encounters Staunton who is searching for his lost son. They travel together to Roseneath, landing in a cove as a storm threatens.

Ch. 15 (53 [52]): Staunton is killed in an attack by Donacha Dhu na Dunaigh and his men. The Whistler is captured and sentenced to death by Knockdunder, but Jeanie facilitates his escape. He ended up with the wild Indians in America. After a further ten years in fashionable society, his mother retired to the convent on the Continent where she had been educated.

== Reception ==
The Heart of Mid-Lothian was the first of the full-length Waverley novels to disappoint the majority of its reviewers. Although the author's genius was not in doubt with most critics, almost all of them found the new novel prolix and the fourth volume surplus to requirements. There were objections to the plot's coincidences and to signs of hastiness. Several reviewers found it remarkable that a simple country girl like Jeanie Deans could be rendered so interesting, and her interview with Queen Caroline was generally admired. Her sister Effie was also found fascinating, though there were differing views on the moral effect of her later career.

== Adaptations ==
The Heart of Mid-Lothian; or, The Lily of St. Leonards, William Henry Murray's five-act dramatisation of the novel, was first performed at the Theatre Royal, Edinburgh, in February 1820, with scenery by the artists Alexander Nasmyth and David Roberts.

La Vendéenne, described by Francis Gribble as "a drama based on the plot of The Heart of Midlothian" was written for the stage debut of the celebrated French actress Rachel and was first performed 24 July 1837. Though, doubtless there were many unlicensed adaptations of Scott's work produced for the stage on earlier dates, The Heart of Mid-Lothian was adapted for the stage by Dion Boucicault in the 1860s. It has been adapted for the screen twice in 1914, once under the same name, and once under the title A Woman's Triumph. A television version was released in 1966. Two operas have also been based upon the novel – La Prigione di Edimburgo (Imprisoned in Edinburgh) by the Italian composer Federico Ricci (1809–1877) and Jeanie Deans by the Scottish classical composer, Hamish MacCunn (1868–1916).

== Painting ==
- Ary Scheffer, Effie and Jeanie Deans, oil on canvas, Musée de la Vie romantique, Hôtel Scheffer-Renan, Paris
- James McNeill Whistler, Effie Deans (1876–1878), oil on canvas; Rijksmuseum, Amsterdam

== See also ==
- Old Tolbooth, Edinburgh
- Porteous Riots
- John Porteous (soldier)
- Heart of Midlothian Football Club
