= Peter Williamson (memoirist) =

Scottish memoirist (1730–1799)

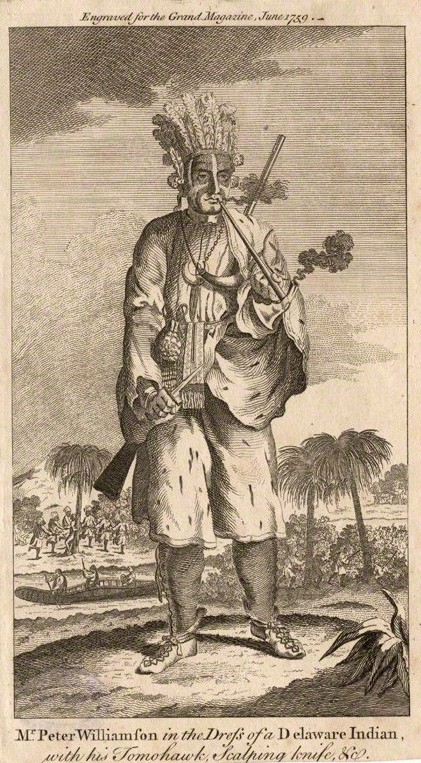
"Indian Peter" dressed as a Delaware Indian

Peter Williamson (1730 – 19 January 1799), also known as "Indian Peter", was a Scottish memoirist who was part-showman, part-entrepreneur and inventor. Born in a croft in Aberdeenshire, he was forcibly taken to North America at an early age, but succeeded in returning to Scotland where he eventually became a well-known character in 18th century Edinburgh. He adopted the pseudonym "Indian Peter" due to his time spent with native Americans and his self-exploitation of this in an autobiography and by touring Scotland and England in the guise of a "Red Indian".

== Early life ==
Williamson was born the son of James Williamson in a croft in Hirnlay near Aboyne. He described his parents as "reputable though not rich" and at an early age was sent to live with a maiden aunt in Aberdeen.

Though little acknowledged in history, there was in those days a thriving trade in stolen children and others. Those engaged in kidnapping were called "spirits", and many of those who were spirited away were taken to North America. In January 1743, Williamson fell victim to the trade when he was kidnapped while playing on the quay at Aberdeen. His autobiography gives his age as eight at the time. Some of the Aberdeen bailies were suspected of colluding with the traffickers; an estimated 600 children disappeared from the port when the trade was at its height between 1740 and 1746.

== The Plantation ==
Williamson was taken to Philadelphia and sold for £16 as an indentured servant for a period of seven years to a fellow Scot, Hugh Wilson. Wilson had himself been kidnapped as a boy and sold into indentured servitude, but, like many indentured servants, had earned his freedom. He may have therefore sympathised with Peter's situation.

Williamson said Wilson treated him kindly, and when the latter died in 1750, just before the end of the indenture, he bequeathed the boy £120 plus his best horse and saddle and all his clothes. This helped bring about a change in Peter's fortunes.

== Continuing life in America ==
At the age of 24, Williamson married the daughter of a wealthy plantation owner and was given a dowry of 200 acres (80 hectares) of land close to the frontier of Pennsylvania, where he settled down to live as a farmer.

On the night of 2 October 1754 his farm was attacked by Cherokee Indians and he was taken prisoner. The house was plundered and burned to the ground. Williamson related that he was forced to march many miles acting as a pack-mule for the Cherokees and that, whilst with them, he witnessed many murders and scalpings.

After several months he escaped and made his way back to his father-in-law's home, where he learnt that his wife had died in his absence.

He was called before the State Assembly in Philadelphia to pass on any information he had acquired during his captivity. Whilst there, he enlisted in an army regiment raised to combat in the French and Indian War. In the following two years he rose to the rank of lieutenant.

== Third capture/return to Scotland ==
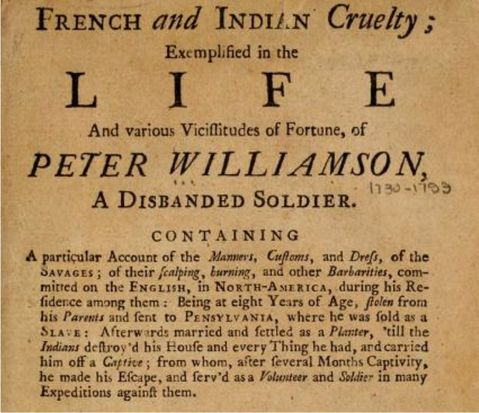
Title page of French and Indian Cruelty

In a now repeating pattern he was captured by French troops and marched to Quebec. He was then granted status as an "exchange prisoner" and sent on a ship to Plymouth in England where he arrived in November 1756. Having a damaged left hand from being wounded, he was discharged from the army as unfit and given a small gratuity of six shillings to help him.

He set off to walk from Plymouth back to Aberdeen (almost exactly 1000 km). Arriving penniless in York his stories aroused the interest of some "honourable and influential men" who encouraged him to write about his exploits. With their backing he published his account under the title French and Indian Cruelty, exemplified in the Life and various Vicissitudes of Fortune of Peter Williamson, who was carried off from Aberdeen in his Infancy and sold as a slave in Pennsylvania.

A thousand copies of the book were sold, earning Williamson a profit of £30, which allowed him to continue his journey to Scotland in comparative ease.

== Return to Scotland ==
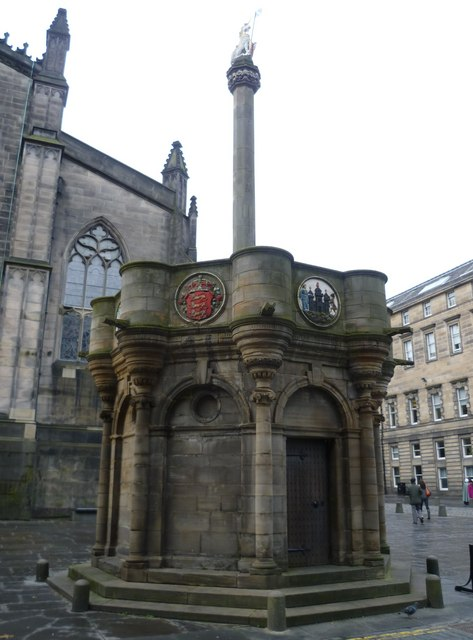
The Mercat Cross, Edinburgh (reconstructed 1885)

As he travelled northwards, Williamson took to dressing as a "Red Indian" and giving displays of Indian life, e.g. demonstrating war-cries and dancing, to help sell further copies of his book which he carried around with him. In June 1758 he finally returned to Aberdeen, some 15 years after his kidnapping.

While he was selling copies of his book in Aberdeen, the authorities charged Williamson with libel in relation to his accusations of their involvement in his original kidnapping. Since the same magistrates he was accusing were also judging him, a guilty verdict was perhaps inevitable. Surplus copies of his book were seized and burned publicly at the mercat cross by the common hangman. Williamson was made to sign a statement stating that his claims were false, fined five shillings and banished from Aberdeen as a vagrant.

== Edinburgh ==
Williamson then headed for Edinburgh where he settled for the remainder of his life. Here he opened a coffee house under Parliament House which became a favourite resort of Edinburgh lawyers and their clients. He also published revised and embellished editions of French and Indian Cruelty.

Robert Fergusson devoted a verse of his poem The Rising of the Session to this popular establishment:

This vacance [vacation] is a heavy doom
On Indian Peter's coffee-room
For a' his china pigs are toom [bottles are empty]
Nor do we see
In wine the soukar biskets soom [sugar biscuits swim]
As light's a flee

Having read his book, some of the lawyers encouraged him to sue the Aberdeen magistrates. The case was heard in the Court of Session in Edinburgh and the judges found unanimously in Williamson's favour. The Provost of Aberdeen, four bailies and the Dean of Guild were forced to pay him £100 in compensation.

Emboldened by this success, Williamson decided further to sue Bailie William Fordyce and others, who he believed were personally responsible for his kidnapping. The case went before James Forbes, Sheriff-Substitute of Aberdeenshire, acting as arbiter. It seems that the defendants wined and dined Forbes generously ahead of his final deliberations and he exonerated them. The decree was read out at the mercat cross the next day.

However, the case was referred to the Court of Session in Edinburgh, and after Williamson produced hard evidence of the defendants' involvement, the Court reversed the Sheriff-Substitute's decision in December 1763. Williamson was awarded £200 damages plus 100 guineas legal costs.

== Fame and fortune ==
Williamson's new-found wealth enabled him to open a tavern in Parliament Close bearing a sign worded, Peter Williamson, Vintner From The Other World, in allusion to his time in North America. A wooden figure of him in Delaware Indian costume stood at the head of the close to advertise its location.

In 1769 Williamson opened a printing shop in the Luckenbooths between St Giles High Kirk and the north side of the Royal Mile. He taught himself the craft of printing using a portable press purchased in London. He then invented his own portable printing press and travelled to exhibitions and fairs to promote his new product. He also invented waterproof ink for stamping linen which withstood both boiling and bleaching.

In 1773 Williamson compiled the first Edinburgh street directory in conjunction with his idea of setting up a regular postal service in the city. This comprised a list of streets and closes with the addresses of lawyers, merchants, officials and other notable gentlemen. Addresses of shops and taverns were also included, thereby not only hugely aiding navigation in the city but creating what is now a very valuable historical source. The Directory cost one shilling and was published regularly with relevant updates until 1796.

In 1776 he launched a weekly magazine, The Scots Spy or Critical Observer but this ran only from 8 March until 30 August 1776. It was issued each Friday and contained articles and local gossip. He tried to revive this in 1777 under the title The New Scots Spy but this second venture ran only from 29 August until 14 November 1777.

In 1777 he married Jean the daughter of John Wilson, a bookseller in Edinburgh. They divorced in 1788.

The National Portrait Gallery in London has a print which appeared in The Grand Magazine in June 1759 showing Williamson in full "Delaware Indian" dress with tomahawk and scalping knife. The caricaturist John Kay drew him in Indian costume some time around 1768 and this drawing appeared in the preface of later editions of Williamson's autobiography. It also appears as portrait No.128 in Kay's "Original Portraits", a collection of drawings of Edinburgh characters of the time.

== Postal service ==
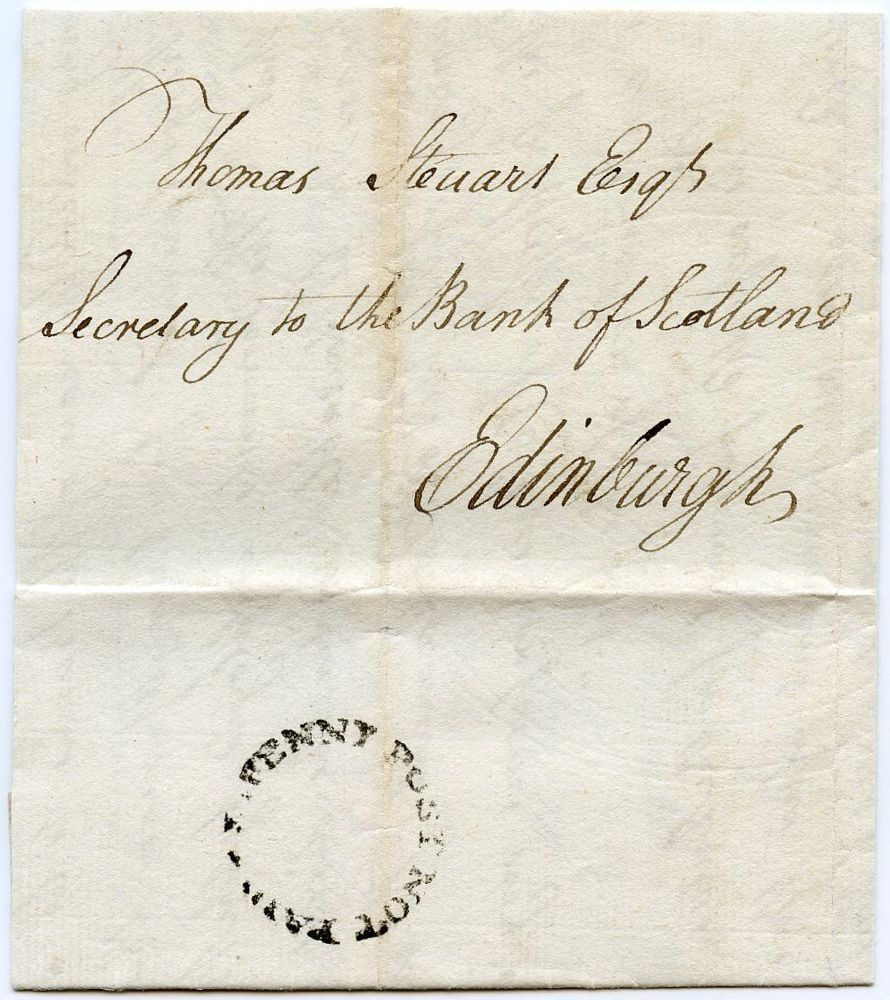
1774 entire wrapper posted in Peter Williamson's postal service with "E. Penny Post Not Paid" circular handstamp in black ink on the reverse

Some time before 1774 Williamson introduced a postal service in Edinburgh. This is evidenced in his Edinburgh Directory of that year, where he draws the public's attention to the fact that "the publisher" (i.e. himself) is willing to dispatch letters and packages up to 3 pounds in weight to any place within one mile of the city's mercat cross, as well as to properties in North and South Leith. The service was run from his premises in the Luckenbooths every hour on the hour and cost one penny. However, from its outset until 1776 Williamson's postal service ran in rivalry to the official postal service, only in 1776 did Williamson take over the official role as Postmaster, in a penny post system.

Seventeen local shopkeepers spread throughout the city were paid to receive the letters, thus effectively creating the first "post offices". Four uniformed postmen were employed to deliver from the Luckenbooths to the shops. Their hats were emblazoned with the words "Penny Post" and they were numbered 1, 4, 8 and 16 (giving the impression that the business was bigger than it was).

The service was the first regular and continuous postal service in Scotland, and ran under Williamson's control for 30 years. In 1793, it was integrated into the General Post Office and Williamson received £25 for the goodwill of the business and a pension of 25 shillings per year.

The penny post was formalised by Act of Parliament in 1799 following Williamson's death.

The poet Robert Fergusson again referred to Williamson in Codicile to Robert Fergusson's Last Will:

To Williamson, and his resetters
Dispersing of the burial letters
That they may pass with little cost
Fleet on the wings of penny-post

== Death ==
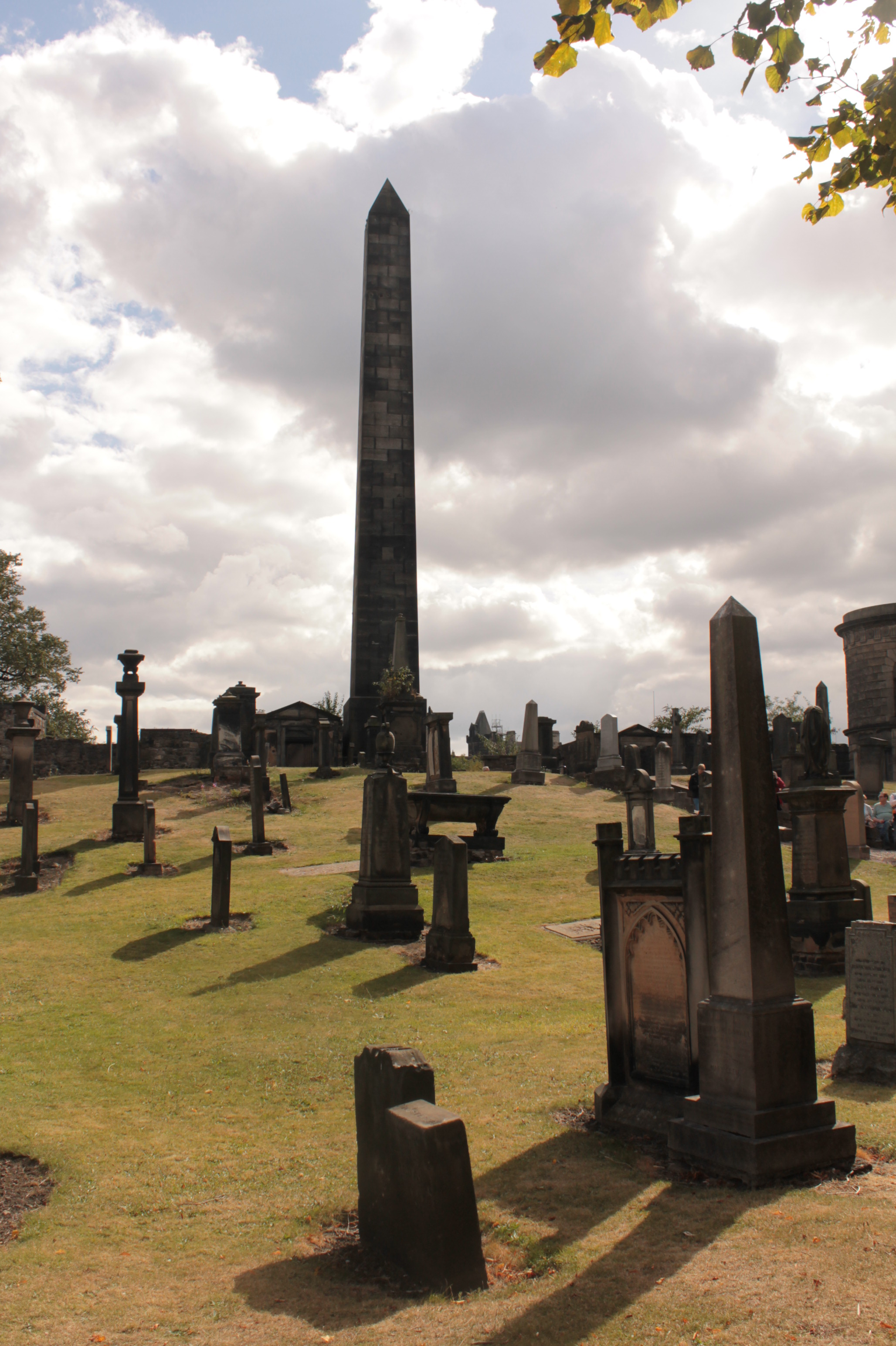
The north-east section of Old Calton Burial Ground where Peter Williamson was buried

In his final years Williamson returned to running a tavern, this time in the Lawnmarket, where he seems to have become an alcoholic. He died "of a decline" in January 1799, aged 74, and was buried on 22 January.

He was buried in ground belonging to John Scott in the Old Calton Burial Ground in Edinburgh, 15 metres northeast of the Political Martyrs' Monument. Whilst the grave is unmarked, he is at least commemorated today by tour guides. His obituary in "The Scots Magazine" appeared soon after and praised Williamson and his various fortunes, good and bad.

His Street Directory was taken over in 1800 by Thomas Aitchison who had a printworks on Fleshmarket Close in the old Town.

== Veracity of Indian captivity narrative ==
The veracity of Williamson's captivity story was challenged almost as soon as it was first printed, and the work has always been seen as suspect among professional historians. In a 1964 article for the quarterly journal Pennsylvania History: A Journal of Mid-Atlantic Studies, J. Bennett Nolan qualified Williamson as "one of the greatest liars who ever lived."

Whilst Bennett's statement may be slightly harsh, recent scholarship speculates that large parts of Williamson's narrative are in fact a fabrication; including possibly his marriage, his age at the time of his first kidnapping from Aberdeen, and most significantly his capture by Native Americans.

Whilst Williamson's tale is "not to be trusted as an account of Indian Captivity," it is an interesting example of the popular literature genre Timothy J. Shannon has called "narratives of unfortunates." It is also a good example of anti-French propaganda during the Seven Years' War, and like Defoe's Robinson Crusoe, sheds light on the colonial construction and representation of native peoples.

== Works ==
=== Written by Peter Williamson ===
- French and Indian Cruelty, exemplified in the Life and various Vicissitudes of Fortune of Peter Williamson, who was carried off from Aberdeen in his Infancy and sold as a slave in Pennsylvania (York, 1757)
- Some Considerations of the Current State of Affairs Wherein the Defenceless State of Great Britain is Pointed Out (York, 1758)
- A Brief Account of the War in North America (Edinburgh, 1760)
- Travels of Peter Williamson amongst the Different Nations and Tribes of Savage Indians in America (Edinburgh, 1768) (reprinted 1786)
- A Nominal Encomium on the City of Edinburgh (Edinburgh, 1769)
- A General View of the Whole World (Edinburgh, c.1770)
- A Curious Collection of Moral Maxims and Wise Sayings (Edinburgh, c.1772)
- The Royal Abdication of Peter Williamson, King of the Mohawks (Edinburgh c.1775)
- Proposals for Establishing a Penny Post (Edinburgh c.1773)

=== Printed by Peter Williamson ===
- Psalms in Metre (Edinburgh, 1779)
- The Poems of Sir David Lindsay (Edinburgh, 1776)
- William Meston's Mob Contra Mob or The Rabblers Rabbled
- An Accurate View (Edinburgh 1783) [a broadsheet listing the streets, wynds and closes of Edinburgh]
