= Alexander Kincaid =

Scottish printer and publisher (1710–1777)

Alexander Kincaid (17 March 1710 – 21 January 1777) was a Scottish printer and publisher who served as Lord Provost of Edinburgh from 1776 to 1777.

== Life ==
He was born on 17 March 1710 in Falkirk the son of James Kincaid of Bantaskine House and his wife Isabell Russall. He was apprenticed to James McQueen (or McEwen) printer in Edinburgh from 1724 to 1734. From 1735 he operated independently as a printer in a sequence of premises on the Royal Mile.

In 1737 he joined the Town Council of Edinburgh (located immediately adjacent to his shop) and he served various roles in the council for the rest of his life.

He became His Majesty's Printer to Scotland in June 1749. From 1751 to 1758 he was part of the firm Kincaid & Donaldson and from 1758 to 1771 was a partner in Kincaid & Bell.

In 1758 he purchased the bookshop of Allan Ramsay in the Luckenbooths next to St Giles Cathedral. He then went into business with a new partner creating Kincaid and Bell.

In 1764 he employed Alexander Adam to tutor his sons (including Alexander Kincaid jr).

From 1771 he went into business with William Creech, and in 1773, following his marriage to William Creech's mother, he passed the bookshop element of his business to Creech. It was thereafter known as "Creech's Land".

In 1775 he is described as "The King's Printer" with premises on the Cowgate.

He held the role of Lord Provost for only four months, being elected in September 1776 and dying in office on 21 January 1777. He was buried in Greyfriars Kirkyard on 23 January.

== Family ==
Little is known of his first wife. Four of his sons are said to have fought in skirmishes following the Battle of Culloden in 1746 as Jacobite supporters. They fled to Virginia in America in 1746 to escape punishment. His eldest son, also Alexander Kincaid, took over the family printworks in 1777 and is often confused with the father. Alexander, the younger, wrote "A History of Edinburgh" in 1787.

In 1751 he married Caroline Ker, daughter of Sir Charles Kerr.

From 1771 he was a "stepfather" to William Creech but it is unclear if he married his mother. The relationship was very close from 1773.

He also appears strongly connected to "Mrs MacKenzie" a trader in the Luckenbooths in 1773 next to his old shop, and mother to Thomas Kincaid Mackenzie. Given the clear connections he may be presumed to be either his biological father or in some way related.

== Notable publications (as printer) ==
- Edinburgh Evening Courant from 1735 to 1777.
- David Hume's "Essays Moral and Political" (1742)
- Lord Kames's "Essays on British Antiquities" (1747)
- From 1747 he had the monopoly for printing bibles, hymnaries and psalters
- The works of John Milton (1755)
- The works of Jonathan Swift (1756)
- Adam Smith's "Theory of Modern Sentiments" (1759)
- Lord Kames's "Elements of Criticism" (1762)
- Thomas Reid's "Inquiry into the Human Mind" (1764)
- Adam Ferguson's "Essay on the History of Civil Society" (1767)
- The sermons of Hugh Blair (1777) sold after his death
