= William Creech =

Scottish publisher and politician (1745–1815)

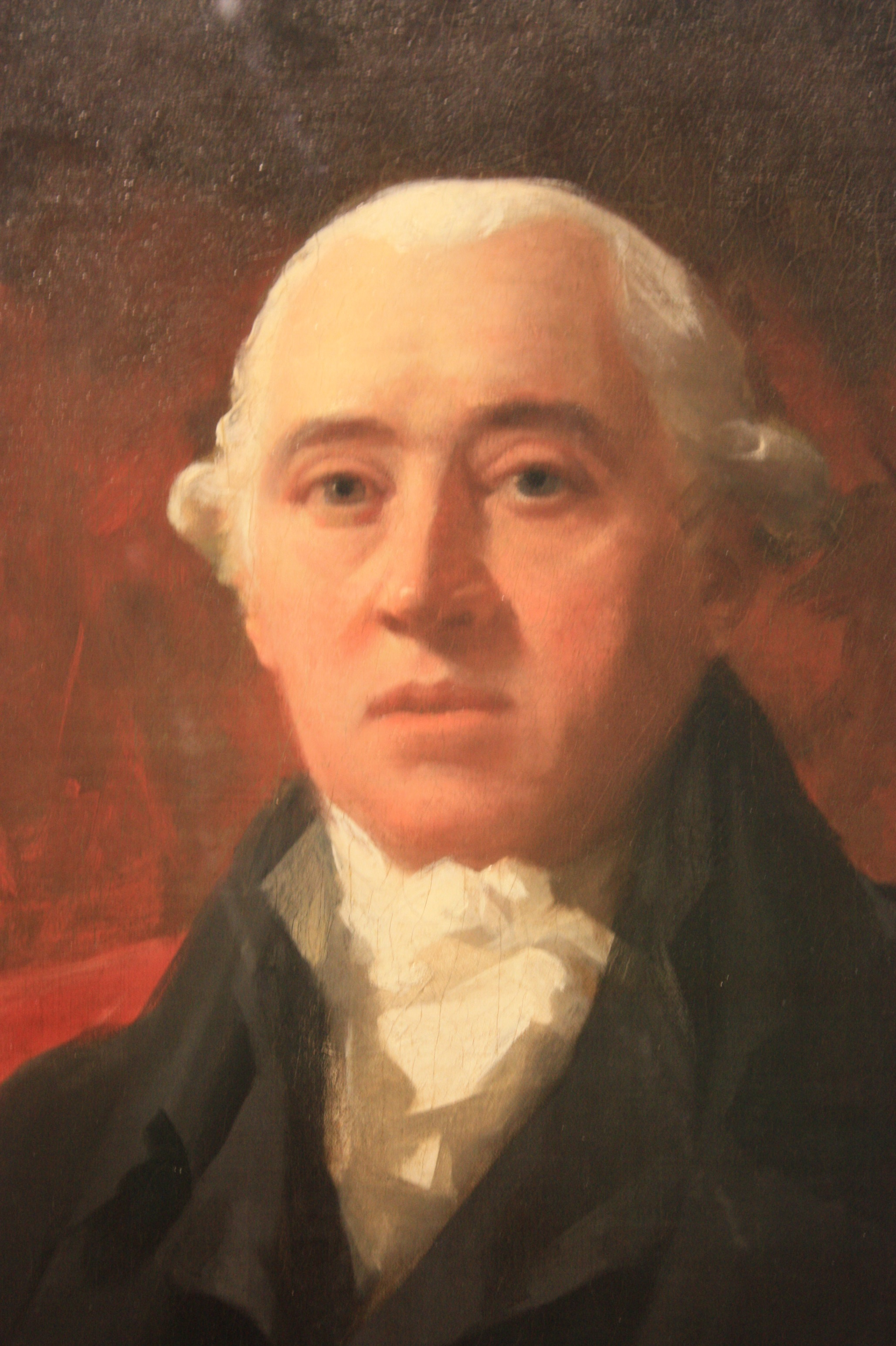
- William Creech by Sir Henry Raeburn 1806

Lord Provost of Edinburgh
- In office 1811–1813

Personal details
- Born: May 12, 1745 Edinburgh, Scotland
- Died: January 14, 1815 (aged 69) Edinburgh, Scotland
- Resting place: Greyfriars Kirkyard, Edinburgh
- Occupation: Publisher, printer, bookseller, politician
- Known for: Chief publisher in Edinburgh; published first Edinburgh edition of Robert Burns’ poems

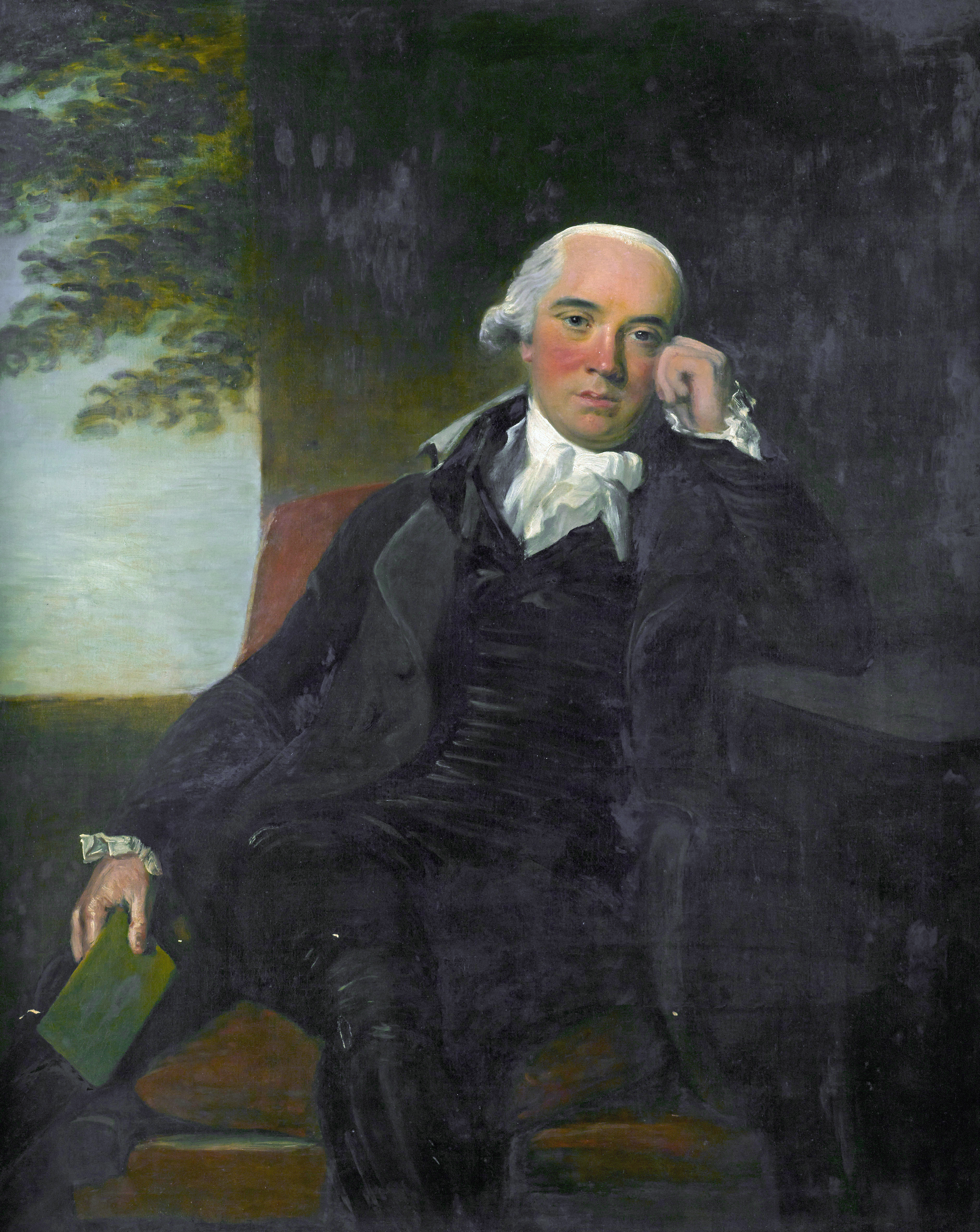
William Creech (1745–1815) (attributed to William Beechey)

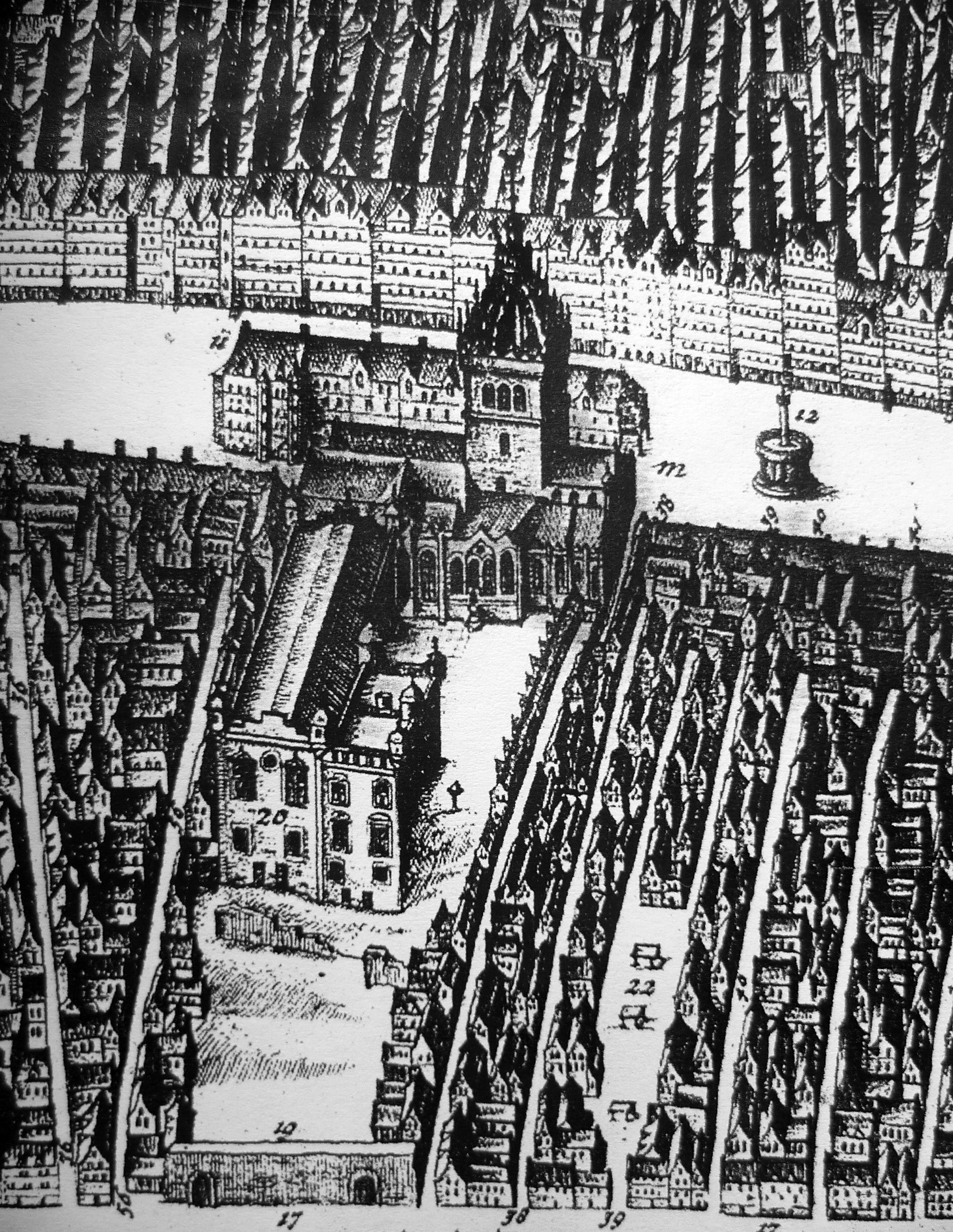
Detail from James Gordon of Rothiemay's map of Edinburgh 1647. Creech's Land was the eastmost shop immediately behind St Giles Cathedral, facing the Market Cross

William Creech FRSE (12 May 1745 – 14 January 1815) was a Scottish publisher, printer, bookseller and politician. For 40 years Creech was the chief publisher in Edinburgh. He published the first Edinburgh edition of Robert Burns' poems, and Sir John Sinclair's influential "Statistical Accounts of Scotland". In publishing Creech often went under the pseudonym of Theophrastus.

== Life ==
Creer was the son of Mary Buley and Rev William Creech, a minister in Newbattle, Midlothian. His father died when he was four months old and he then spent time with his mother in both Perth and Dalkeith. He was educated at Dalkeith Grammar School then studied medicine at the University of Edinburgh.

From 1766 to 1768 he travelled with William Strahan and Thomas Cadell to London, France and the Netherlands. After period of time back in Edinburgh he went on a Grand Tour in 1770 with Lord Kilmaurs, visiting France, Germany, Switzerland and the Netherlands.

His mother struck up a friendship with Alexander Kincaid and thereafter he trained as an apprentice printer in the firm of Kincaid & Bell. In 1771 he went into partnership with his former master (and erstwhile stepfather), Alexander Kincaid. Kincaid was a publisher (and later Lord Provost of Edinburgh) who had purchased Allan Ramsay's bookshop in the Luckenbooths next to St. Giles Cathedral. In 1773 Kincaid gave Creech the bookshop to concentrate on the printing side of his work. The building soon thereafter became known as "Creech's Land", Creech staying here for 44 years. Burn's poems were published from this building.

He was elected a Fellow of the Royal Society of Edinburgh in 1784 (in the first intake of members following its foundation in 1783). His proposers were Andrew Dalzell, James Gregory and Alexander Fraser Tytler. In 1786 he was a founder member of the Edinburgh Chamber of Commerce.

In 1786, John 15th Lord Glencairn introduced Creech to Robert Burns an important alliance was created, leading to Creech printing and selling the famous Edinburgh Editions of Burns' poems in 1787, 1793 and 1794. Creech is one of a small and elite group to have had two poems written about him by Robert Burns: Lament for the Absence of William Creech (usually called "Willie's Awa'"), marking Creech's absence from Edinburgh to visit London: and On William Creech, a short, sharp poem following an argument.

In 1788, he was a member of the jury in Deacon William Brodie's trial for robbery. Within days, his account of the trial and execution was for sale in his High Street bookshop.

Serving as a Councillor from 1780 and Bailie from 1807, he served as Edinburgh's Lord Provost from 1811 to 1813.

He lived at the head of Craigs Close on the Royal Mile until around 1800. The house was formerly the property of the printer Andro Hart. He then moved to 5 George Street in the new Town for his final years.

Creech's land (his shop) was demolished in 1817 to allow vehicles to pass on the north side of St Giles Cathedral.

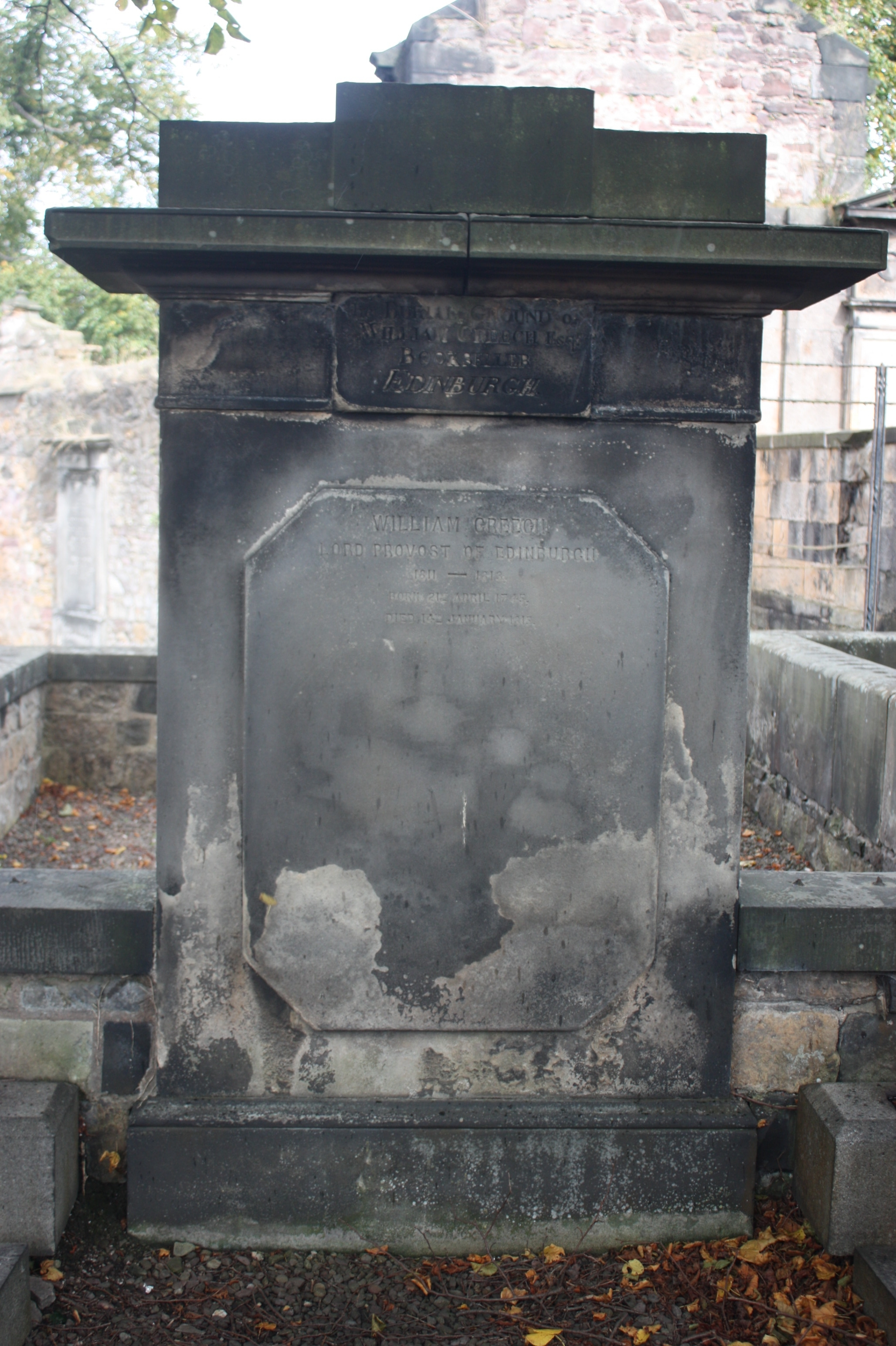
William Creech's grave, Greyfriars Kirkyard

He died at home in Edinburgh and is buried in the western extension of Greyfriars Kirkyard. A plaque to his, and his father's, memory is at Newbattle Kirk.

Creech did not marry and had no children.

== Self publications ==
Creech occasionally wrote the books which he published. The most notable are:

- Account of the Trial of Deacon Brodie (1788)
- Edinburgh's Fugitive Pieces (1815)

== Business connections and friendships ==
Due to Creech's position and standing he held a unique and pivotal role within the Scottish Enlightenment and had both business relationships and friendships with many of the Edinburgh literati.

His most notable relationships include: Robert Burns, whom he published (their relationship, however, was eventually spoiled due to a misunderstanding about Publishing royalties), Lord Kames, Hugh Blair, James Beattie and Dugald Stewart.
