= Parliament Square, Edinburgh =

Street in Royal Mile, Edinburgh, Scotland

Coordinates: 55.94953°N 3.19005°W

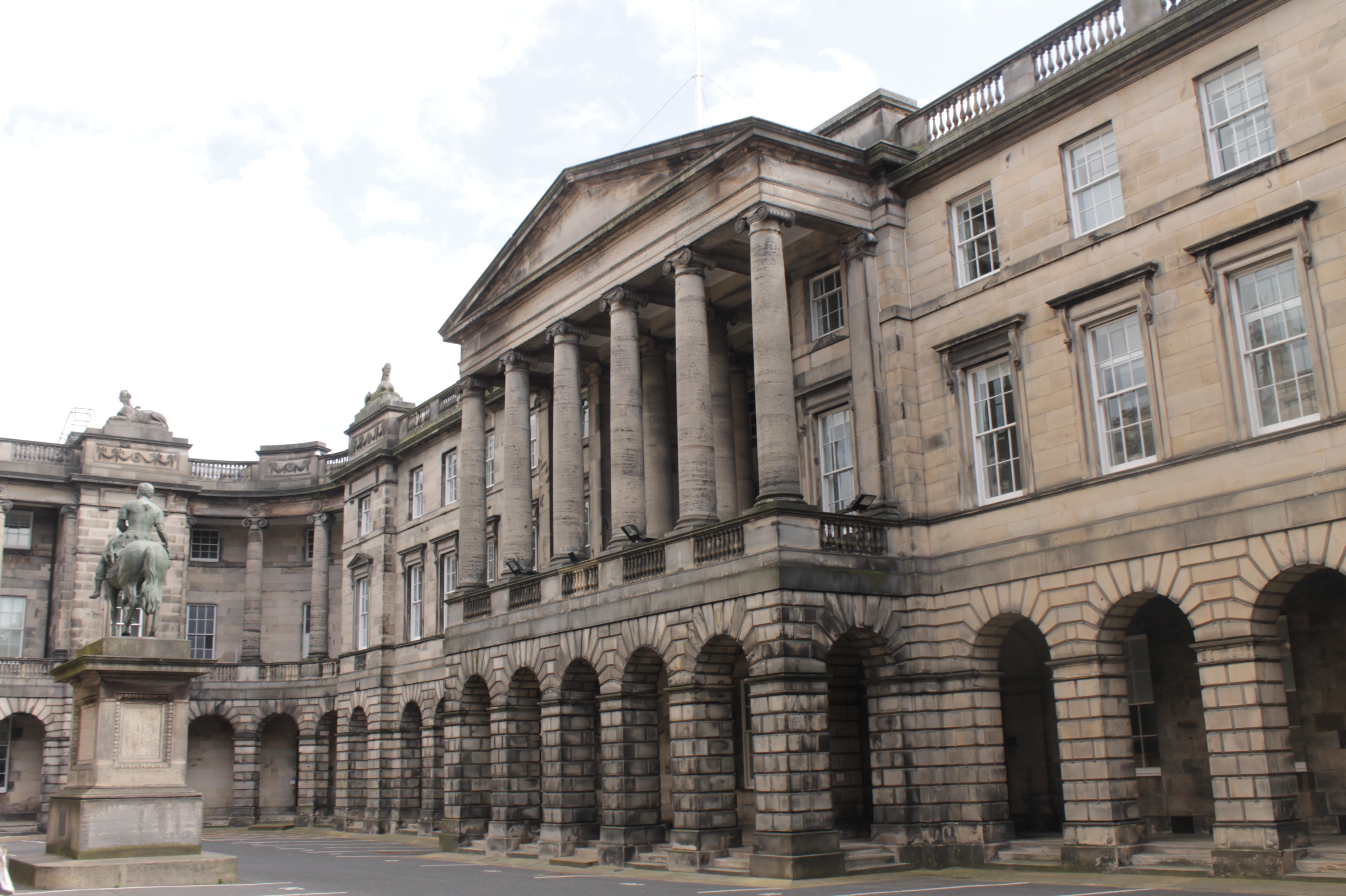
Parliament Square, Edinburgh facing east, showing the equestrian statue of Charles II and the facade of the Law Courts designed by Robert Reid.

Parliament Square, Edinburgh, Scotland, is located off the High Street, part of the Royal Mile. The square is not a formal square, but consists of two sections surrounding St Giles Kirk on three sides: an L-shaped area to the east and south and another area on the west side of the church called West Parliament Square. The Edinburgh Mercat Cross is located on the east side of the square while an equestrian statue of Charles II of Scotland (Note: The equestrian statue of Charles II dates from around 1685. It was the first lead statue in Edinburgh and one of the first in Great Britain (EWH staff 2012a).) stands in front of the entrance to the Supreme Courts of Scotland adjoining Parliament House, on the west side. The Queensberry Memorial to the 5th Duke of Buccleuch, stands in West Parliament Square.

The square also includes a statue of James Braidwood, erected in 2008, who founded what is asserted to be the world's first municipal fire service, in Edinburgh, after the Great Fire of Edinburgh in 1824.

== History ==
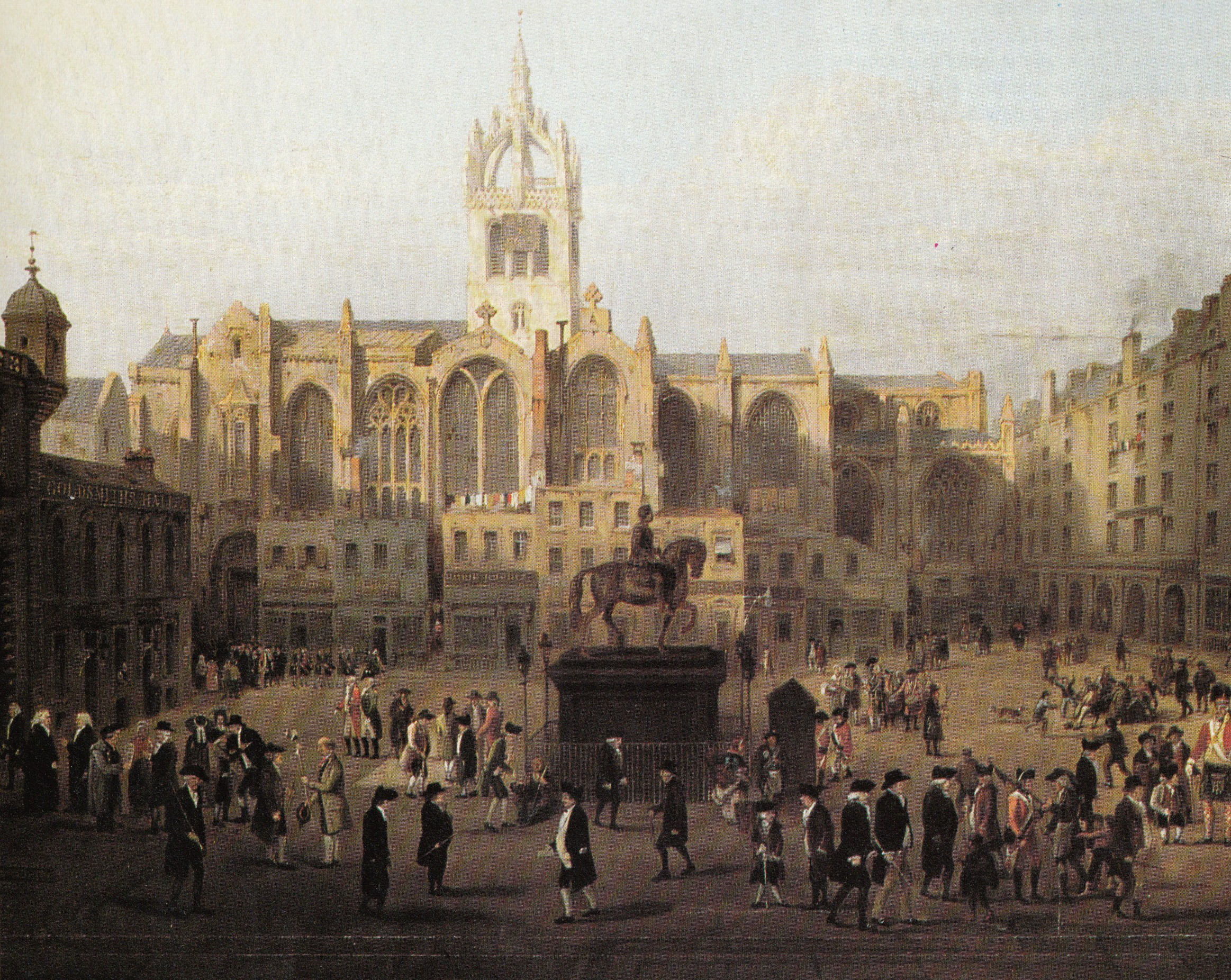
A painting showing Edinburgh characters in Parliament Close in the late 18th century, before the church and Parliament House were re-faced

The square came into existence in 1632 as a forecourt to the Parliament House on the old graveyard of St Giles Kirk. Parliament House not only housed the pre-union Parliament of Scotland but also the Court of Session (the supreme civil court in Scotland). This made the square a centre for the meeting of politicians and lawyers before they entered the building, from the time of its creation until the dissolution of the Scottish parliament with the Act of Union in 1707.

Another building adjacent to the square was the Old Tolbooth, which was "used variously as a meeting place for the Town Council, a tax office, law court and prison, it was finally torn down in 1817". It was from there in 1661 that those found guilty of high treason after the Restoration were taken to be executed next to the mercat cross.

Henry Cockburn lamented the loss of the square's historical name, Parliament Close, a change he attributed to the silliness of fashion ("foppery") when he wrote his memoir of life in Edinburgh in the 1820s.
