= Mercat Cross, Edinburgh =

Historic marker in Scotland

Coordinates: 55°56′59″N 3°11′25″W

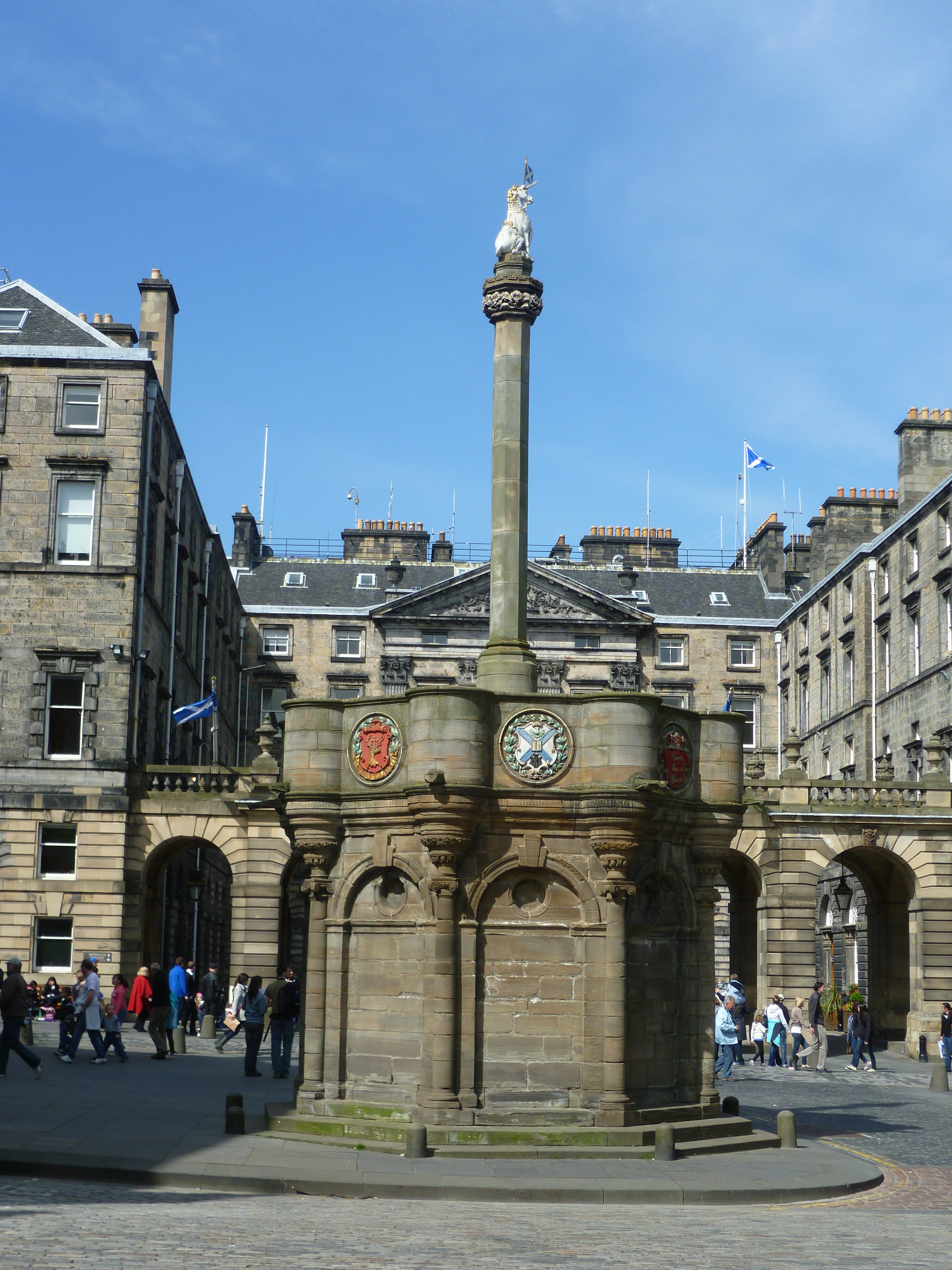
The Mercat Cross viewed from within Parliament Square looking across the Royal Mile with the pediment of Edinburgh City Chambers in the background.

The Mercat Cross of Edinburgh is a market cross, which stands in Parliament Square next to St Giles' Cathedral, facing the High Street in the Old Town of Edinburgh.

== Description and history ==
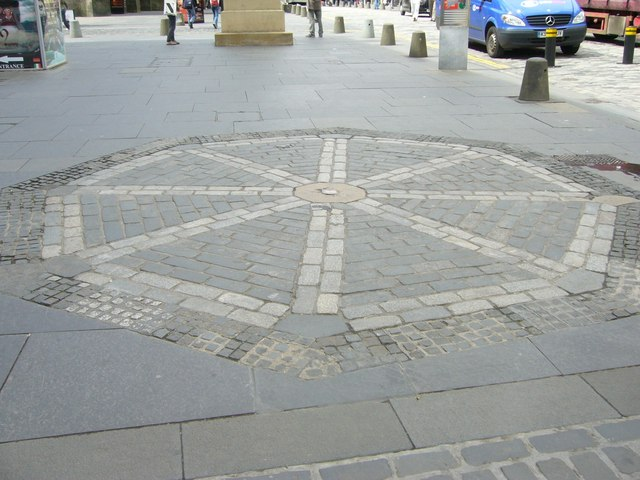
The location of the Cross between 1617 and 1756.

The current mercat cross is of Victorian origin, but was built close to the site occupied by the original. The Cross is first mentioned in a charter of 1365 which indicates that it stood on the south side of the High Street about 45 feet (14 m) from the east end of St. Giles'. In 1617, it was moved (Note: "it being considered necessary by the magistrates to widen the street upon the occasion of the visit of King James the Sixth to his native country, which took place during the month of May this same year" (Drummond 1861, p. 21 cites Calderwood).) to a position a few yards (metres) down the High Street now marked by "an octagonal arrangement of cobble stones" (actually setts). This is the position shown on Gordon of Rothiemay's map of 1647 (see external link below).

In 1756, the Cross was demolished and parts of the pillar re-erected in the grounds of Drum House, Gilmerton. A monument now stands there and on it a plaque that reads: "Erected in memory of the old Mercat Cross of Edinburgh which stood at The Drum from 1756 to 1866. This Monument was erected November 1882". Five of the eight circular medallions featuring sculpted heads from the understructure of the original cross were eventually secured by Sir Walter Scott who incorporated them into the garden wall of his house at Abbotsford in the Scottish Borders.

In 1866, the pieces of the cross from Drum House were reassembled on a new stepped pedestal on the east side of the north door of St Giles (that pedestal now supports the Canongate Cross). Because the pillar had been broken during demolition in 1756, its height was reduced after reassembly from 19.7 to 13.9 feet (6 to 4.25 m) and its girth made thinner. In 1885, it was placed on a new octagonal drum substructure at its current location, 24 feet (7.3 m) south of the original pre-1617 position. This was designed by Sydney Mitchell and paid for by William Gladstone, M.P. for Midlothian from 1880 to 1895, whose father and grandfather hailed from Edinburgh. The sculpted heads on the original cross were replaced by the royal arms of Britain, Scotland, England and Ireland, the burgh arms of Edinburgh, Leith and the Canongate, and the arms of the University.

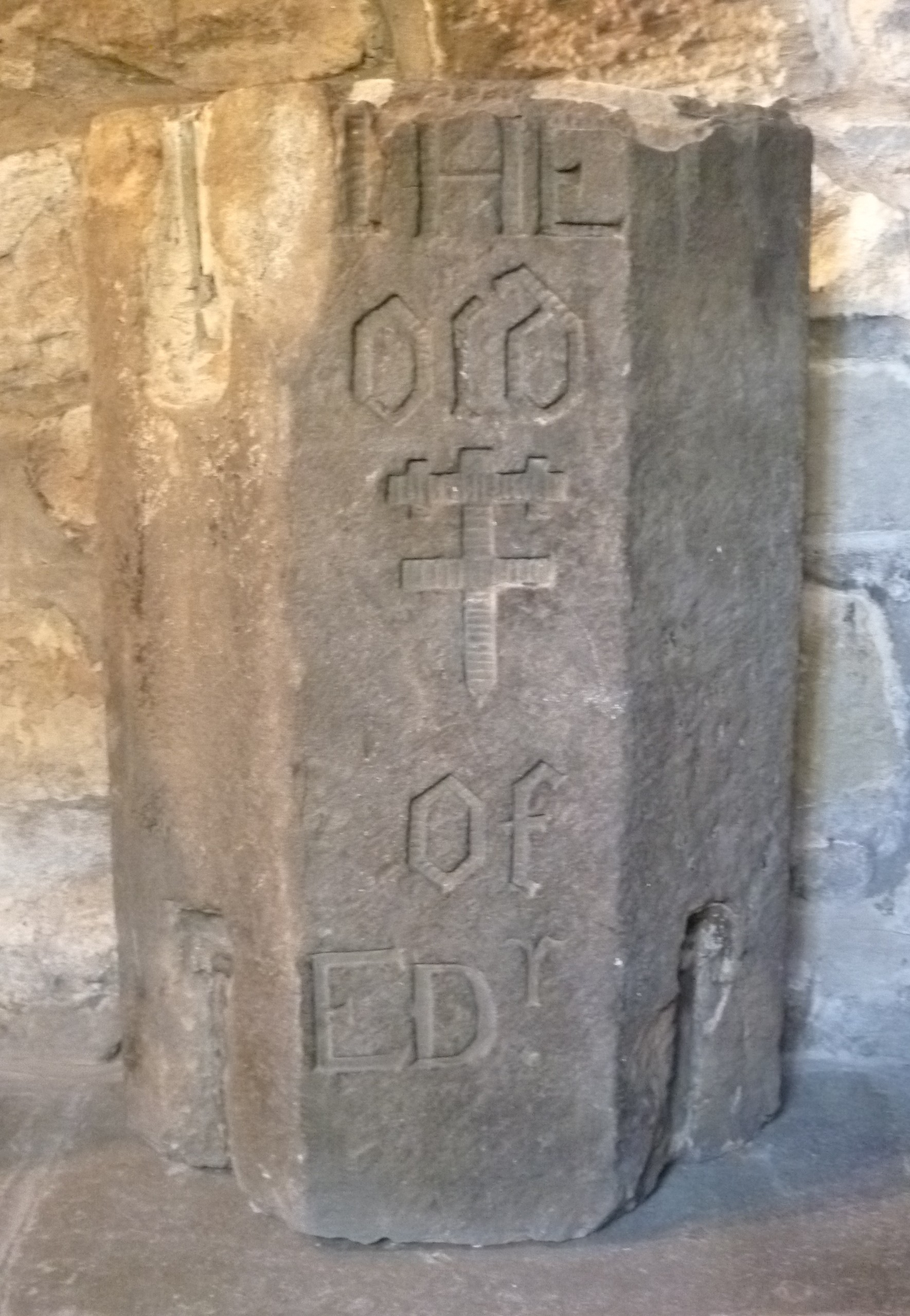
Part of the original cross-shaft in the city's Huntly House Museum

The original shaft was replaced when the Cross underwent extensive renovations in 1970. A study of the stonework, commissioned by the Royal Commission on the Ancient and Historical Monuments of Scotland (RCAHMS) and carried out in 1971, concluded that: embedded in the current structure are two pieces of an old shaft stone, that the capital belongs to the first part of the 15th century and that the unicorn is an 1869 reproduction of its predecessor on the 1617 cross based upon a description in contemporary accounts.

The tympanum above the wooden studded door on the east side of the Cross bears the following Latin inscription composed by William Gladstone, in incised Gothic letters:

DEO . GRATIAS / VETVSTVM . MONVMENTVM . CRVCEM . BVRCI / EDINENSIS . PVBLICIS . MVNERIBVS . AB . ANTIQVO . DICAM / CARMINE . TAM . EXIMIO . QVAM. VIRILI . A . SVMMO . HOMINE . GVATRO / SCOTT . ET . VINDICATAM . ET . DEFLETAM . PRAESVLIBVS / MVNICIPII . PERMISSV . REDINTEGRANDAM . CVRAVIT . GVL . E . GLADSTONE / STIRPE . ORIVNDVS . PER . VTRAMOVE . LINEAM . PENITVS . SCOTICA / A . S . MDCCCLXXXV . DIE . NOVEMBRIS . XXIV

Thanks to God. This ancient monument, the Cross of Edinburgh, which of old was set apart for public ceremonies, having been utterly destroyed by a misguided hand A.D. MDCCLVI, and having been avenged as well as lamented, in song alike noble and manful, by that great man Walter Scott, has now, by favour of the Magistrates of the City, been restored by William Ewart Gladstone, who claims through both his parents a purely Scottish descent. [24th] November 1885.

== Proclamations, burnings and punishments ==
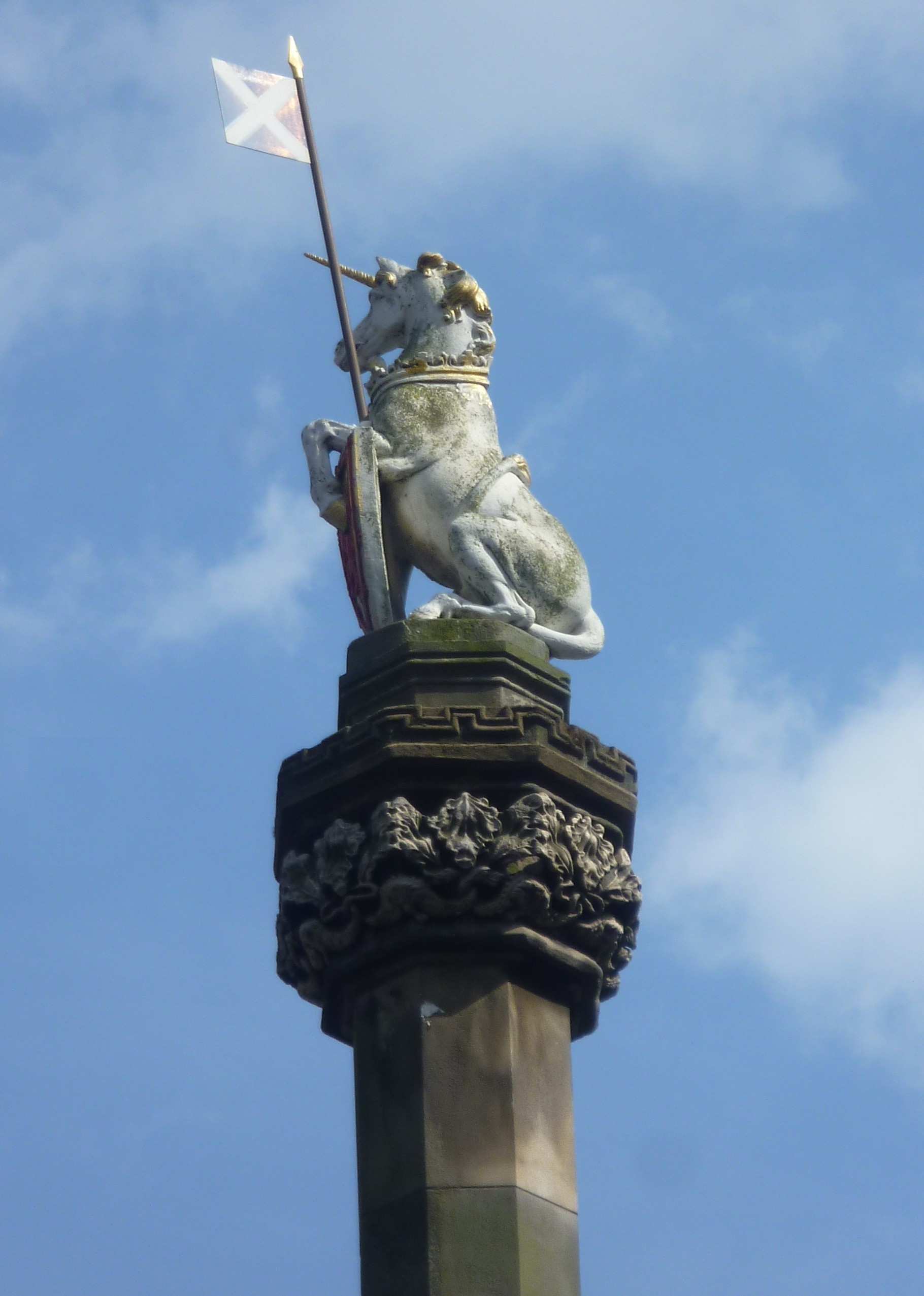
Royal Unicorn on the Cross

As elsewhere in Scotland, important civic announcements were made at the mercat cross. In Edinburgh, royal and parliamentary proclamations that affected all of Scotland were publicly read. The practice of announcing successions to the monarchy and the calling of parliamentary general elections is continued to this day by heralds of the Lord Lyon King of Arms.

Legend has it that in 1513 while the artillery was being prepared in Edinburgh before the Battle of Flodden, which resulted in a Scottish defeat, a demon called Plotcock read out the names of those who would be killed at the Mercat Cross. According to Pitscottie, a former Provost of Edinburgh, Richard Lawson, who lived nearby, threw a coin at the Cross to appeal against this summons and survived the battle.

The cross was painted for the Royal Entry of Mary of Guise into Edinburgh on 20 July 1538. In January 1556, to celebrate the resolution of a dispute between the merchants and the craft organisations the Mercat Cross was draped with tapestry "right honest and pleasant to all the craftsmen".

The Protestant reformer John Knox relates that for one hour and four hours on two separate days in 1565 Sir James Tarbet was tied to the Cross and pelted with eggs for saying the Tridentine Mass, which had been banned by the Scottish Reformation Parliament five years previously.

On 22 August 1567, there was a ceremony of inauguration for Regent Moray in Edinburgh, who took an oath before the Justice Clerk at the Tolbooth and was proclaimed by heralds and trumpets at the Mercat Cross. After the surrender of the "Queen's Men" ended the "Lang Siege" of Edinburgh Castle William Kirkcaldy of Grange, his brother James and the two jewellers James Mosman and James Cockie, who had been minting coins in the Queen's name inside the castle, were hanged at the Cross on 3 August 1573.

It is also recorded that, "Upon 2d day of December, 1584, a baxter's boy [baker's apprentice] called Robert Henderson, (no doubt, by the instigation of Satan) desperately put some powder and a candle in his father's heather-stack, standing in a close opposite to the trone of Edinburgh, and burnt the same with his father's house, which lay next adjacent, to the imminent hazard of burning the whole town: For which, being apprehended most marvellously after his escaping out of the town, he was on the next day burnt quick [alive, not strangled first] at the cross of Edinburgh, as an example".

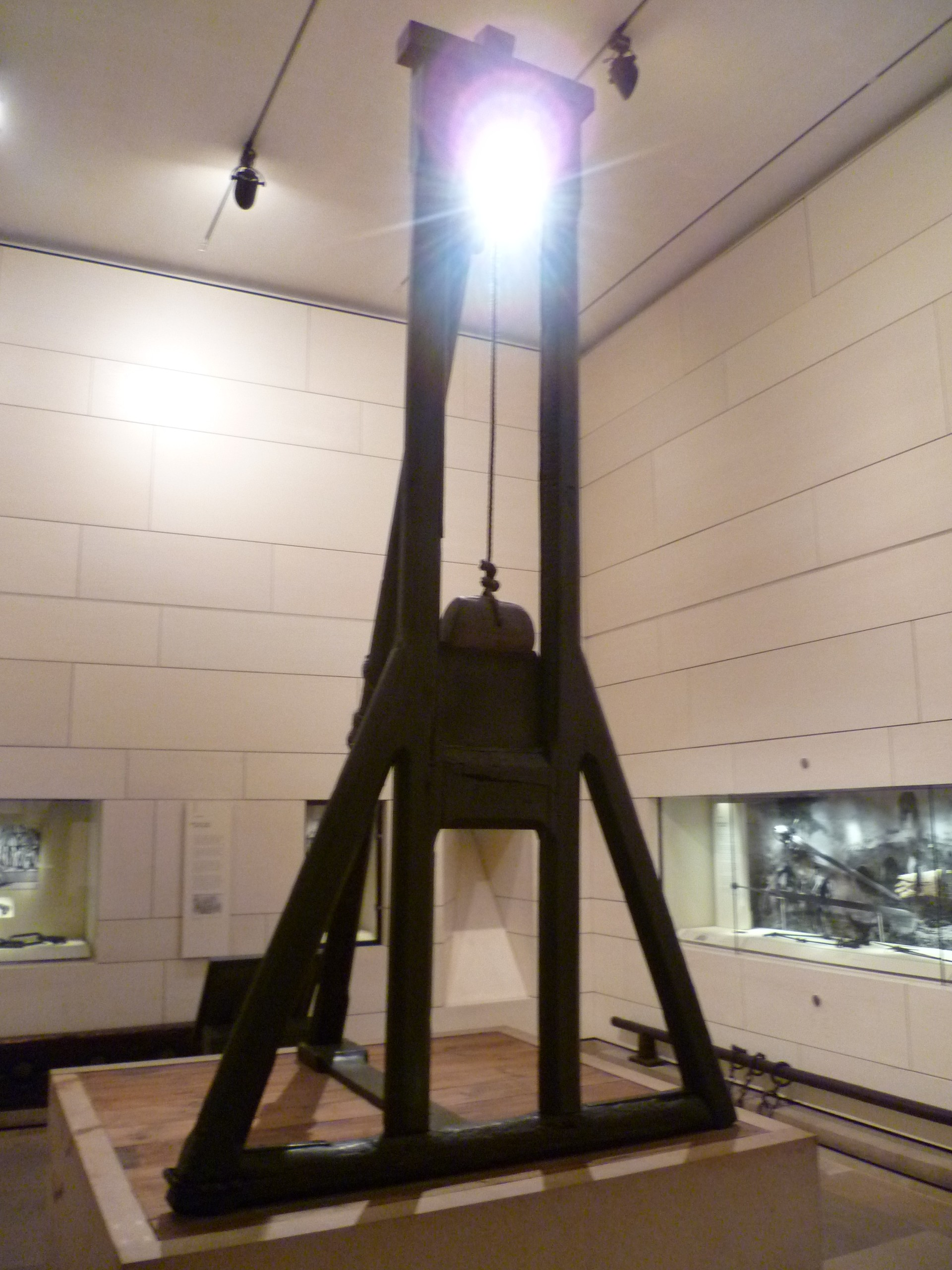
The 'Maiden', used for beheadings in 16th and 17thC Edinburgh

In 1591, John Dickson, convicted of parricide, was "broken upoun the rack" at the Cross. This is one of only two recorded instances of this brutal form of torture and execution being used in Scotland, the other having also occurred at the Cross. Jean Livingstoun of Dunipace, the wife of John Kincaid, Laird of Warriston had, with the connivance of her nurse, hired Robert Weir, one of her father's servants and her reputed lover, to murder her husband, which he did by strangling him in the night. Thanks to the intercession of her kinspeople, on 5 July 1600 Lady Warriston was granted the privilege of being beheaded by the Maiden at the Girth Cross at the foot of the Canongate rather than being executed by one of the more usual methods for females, namely drowning or strangling before burning. (Note: "Girth-Crosse—so called from having once stood at the foot of the Cannongate, near the Girth or sanctuary of Holyrood-house" (Kinloch 1827, p. 52).) The nurse was burnt on the same day her mistress was beheaded. Four years later, in 1604, Weir was apprehended, tried and condemned to be "broken on ane cart wheel with ane coulter of ane pleughe in the hand of the hangman" next to the Mercat Cross.

In 1600, after the failure of the Gowrie conspiracy the corpses of John, Earl of Gowrie and his brother Alexander Ruthven were hanged and quartered at the Mercat Cross, their heads were put on spikes at Edinburgh's Old Tolbooth and their limbs upon spikes at various locations around Perth. On 27 April 1601, James Wood was beheaded in the morning and Archibald Cornwall hanged in the afternoon.

Alastair MacGregor of Glen Strae, chief of the outlawed Clan Gregor was executed at the Cross along with eleven of his kinsmen in January 1604. A contemporary recorded that "Himself being Chieff, he wes hangit his awin hicht aboune [own height above] the rest of hes freindis".

Six days after the execution of King Charles I, the Scottish Estates proclaimed his son Charles II at the Cross on 5 February 1649, thus directly challenging the English Parliament's acceptance of the Commonwealth. (Note: Charles was proclaimed King of Great Britain, France and Ireland. This was seen as a direct challenge to the English Commonwealth as the Scots could have proclaimed him King of the Scots and left the other claims in abeyance pending negotiations (Ferguson 1977, p. 135).) The Cross was the place of execution of the Royalist leaders George Gordon, 2nd Marquis of Huntly on 22 March 1649 and James Graham, 1st Marquis of Montrose on 21 May 1650. Five of Montrose's close supporters were also beheaded there shortly thereafter.

Following occupation by the English Parliamentary Army, the proposal to incorporate Scotland into the Commonwealth was proclaimed at the Cross on 4 February 1652, followed three days later by the symbolic act of hauling down the King's Arms and ceremonially hanging them on the public gallows. In May 1654, General George Monck, the English Military Governor of Scotland, was present for the reading of two proclamations delivered at the Cross, the first declaring Oliver Cromwell to be the Protector of England Ireland and Scotland, and the second confirming Scotland's union with the Commonwealth of England. This union ended with the Restoration of the monarchy in 1660.

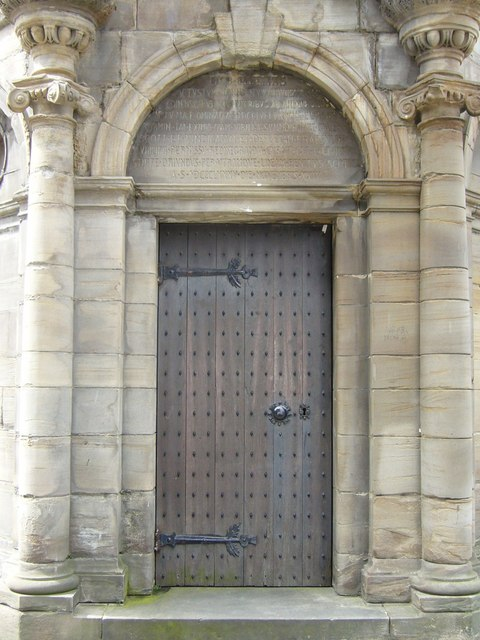
Doorway of the reconstructed Mercat Cross of 1885

Soon after the Restoration four men were condemned to death for high treason and executed at the Cross: Archibald Campbell, 1st Marquis of Argyll was beheaded by the Maiden on 27 May 1661; James Guthrie and Captain William Govan were hanged on 1 June 1661; and Archibald Johnston, Lord Warriston was hanged on 22 July 1663. Guthrie's The Causes of the Lord's Wrath and Samuel Rutherford's Lex, Rex, regarded by the Monarchy as dangerously seditious tracts, had been burned at the Cross by the common hangman in 1660.

In June 1679, two Presbyterian ministers, John King and John Kidd, captured at Bothwell Brig, were executed for taking part in the battle. On 30 July 1680, David Hackston a militant Scottish Covenanter, remembered mainly for his part in the murder of Archbishop James Sharp of St. Andrews, was hanged, drawn and quartered at the Cross (although this was the standard punishment for high treason in England it was very unusual in Scotland). The Solemn League and Covenant was burned in 1682 during the period known as "The Killing Time".

The Marquis of Argyll's son Archibald Campbell, 9th Earl of Argyll was executed at the Cross on 30 June 1685 for attempting to instigate a rising in Scotland to coincide with the Monmouth Rebellion.

On 10 December 1688, a mob, having broken into the private chapel of King James VII at Holyrood Abbey and torn down the woodwork, carried it to the Cross where it was burned along with an effigy of the Pope.

On 26 March 1697 Sir Godfrey McCulloch of Myreton and Cardoness was executed by beheading on the Maiden at Mercat Cross, Edinburgh for the murder of William Gordon.

In July 1725, amidst the Malt Tax Riots, Robert Dundas's The Petition of the several Brewars in and about Edinburgh under subscribing (Edinburgh: n.p., 1725) was brought to the Cross to be read aloud.

On 18 September 1745, the "Young Pretender" Charles Edward Stuart had his father proclaimed King James VIII of Scotland and himself Regent at the Cross. According to Robert Chambers in his History of the Rebellion of 1745, "The ladies, who viewed the scene from their lofty lattices in the High Street, strained their voices in acclamation, and waved white handkerchiefs in honour of the day", but another history claims that "few gentlemen were, however, to be seen in the streets or at the windows, and even among the common people, there were not a few who preserved a stubborn silence". Following the Prince's defeat the following year at Culloden, the Jacobite Army colours captured in the battle were ceremoniously burned at the Cross. In 1752, the Cross became important to the history of Scottish Gaelic literature. Due to Scottish Gaelic national poet and Jacobite Army Captain Alasdair Mac Mhaighstir Alasdair's vocal attacks in verse against both Whig political ideology and the House of Hanover, copies of his 1751 collection of Gaelic poetry, the first ever secular book published in the language, were gathered up and burned at the Cross by the public hangman.

Since the 1707 Acts of Union, the dissolution of parliaments and the death of monarchs have been proclaimed from the Mercat Cross. In 2015 and 2017, Dr Joseph Morrow, the Lord Lyon, proclaimed the dissolution of the UK Parliament ahead of general elections. In September 2022, Dr Morrow read a proclamation stating that Charles III had become King following the death of his mother, Elizabeth II.

== The Mercat Cross medallions at Abbotsford ==
The middle photo shows the Edinburgh Burgh Arms. The heads have never been identified.

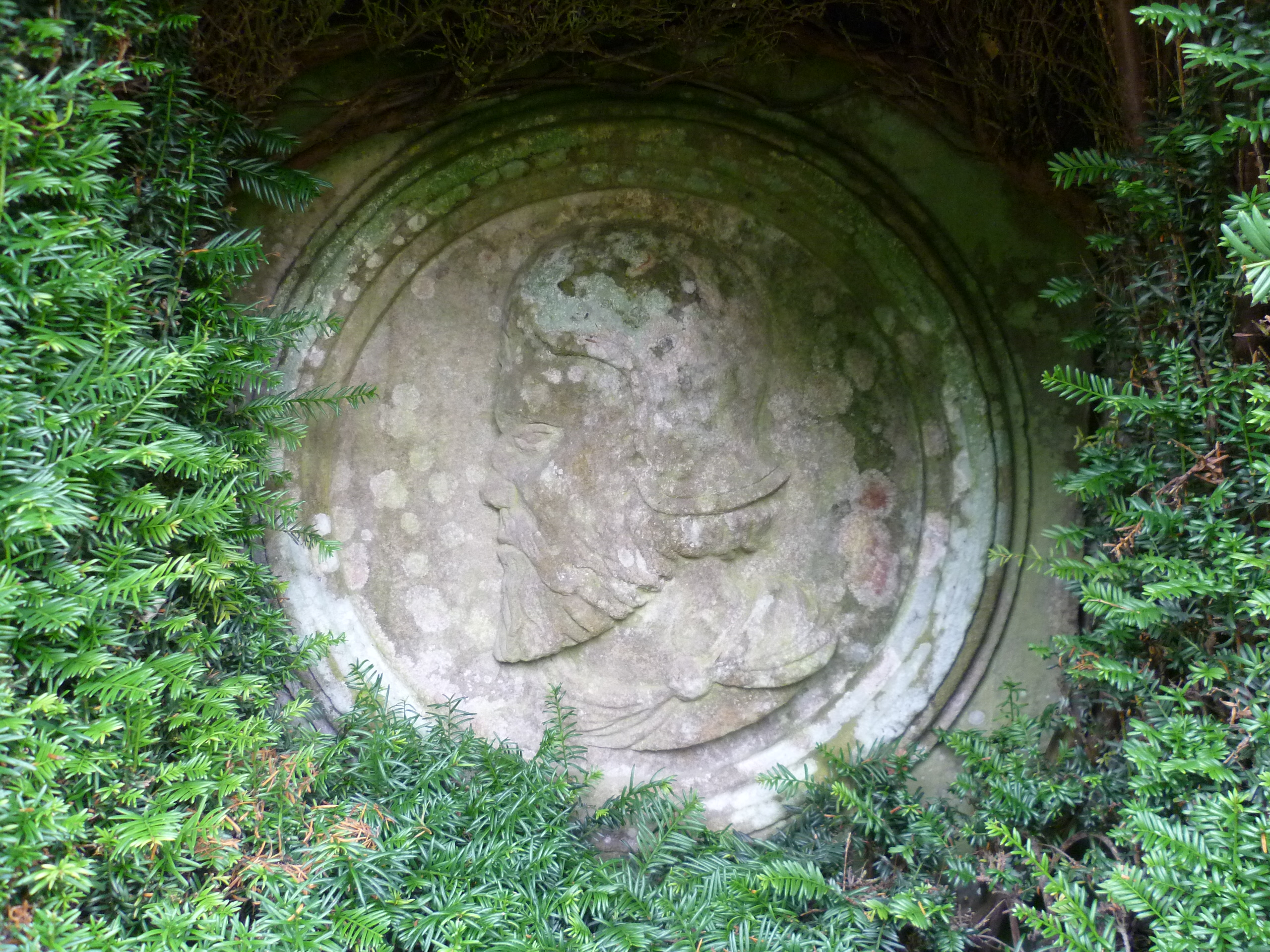

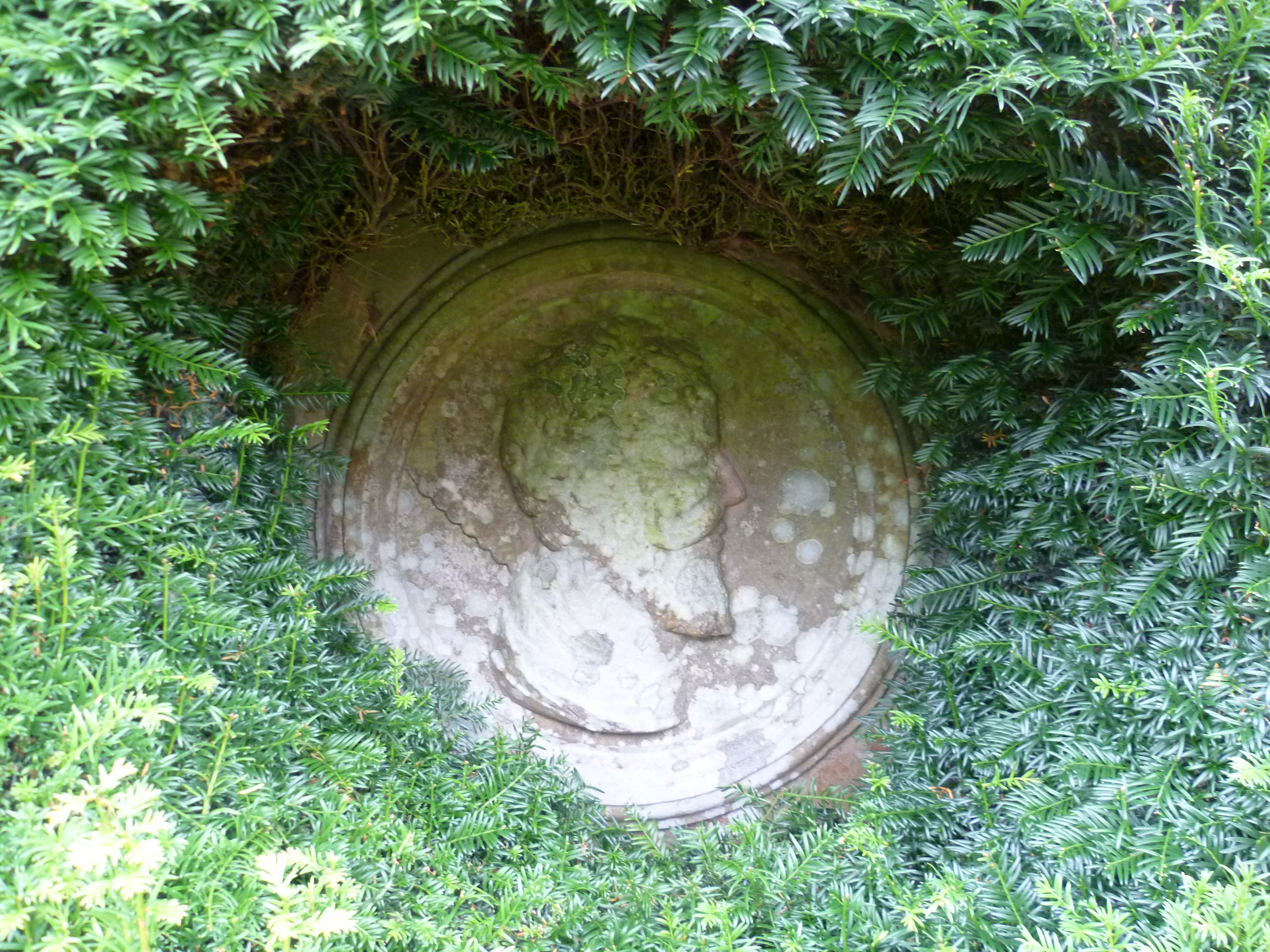

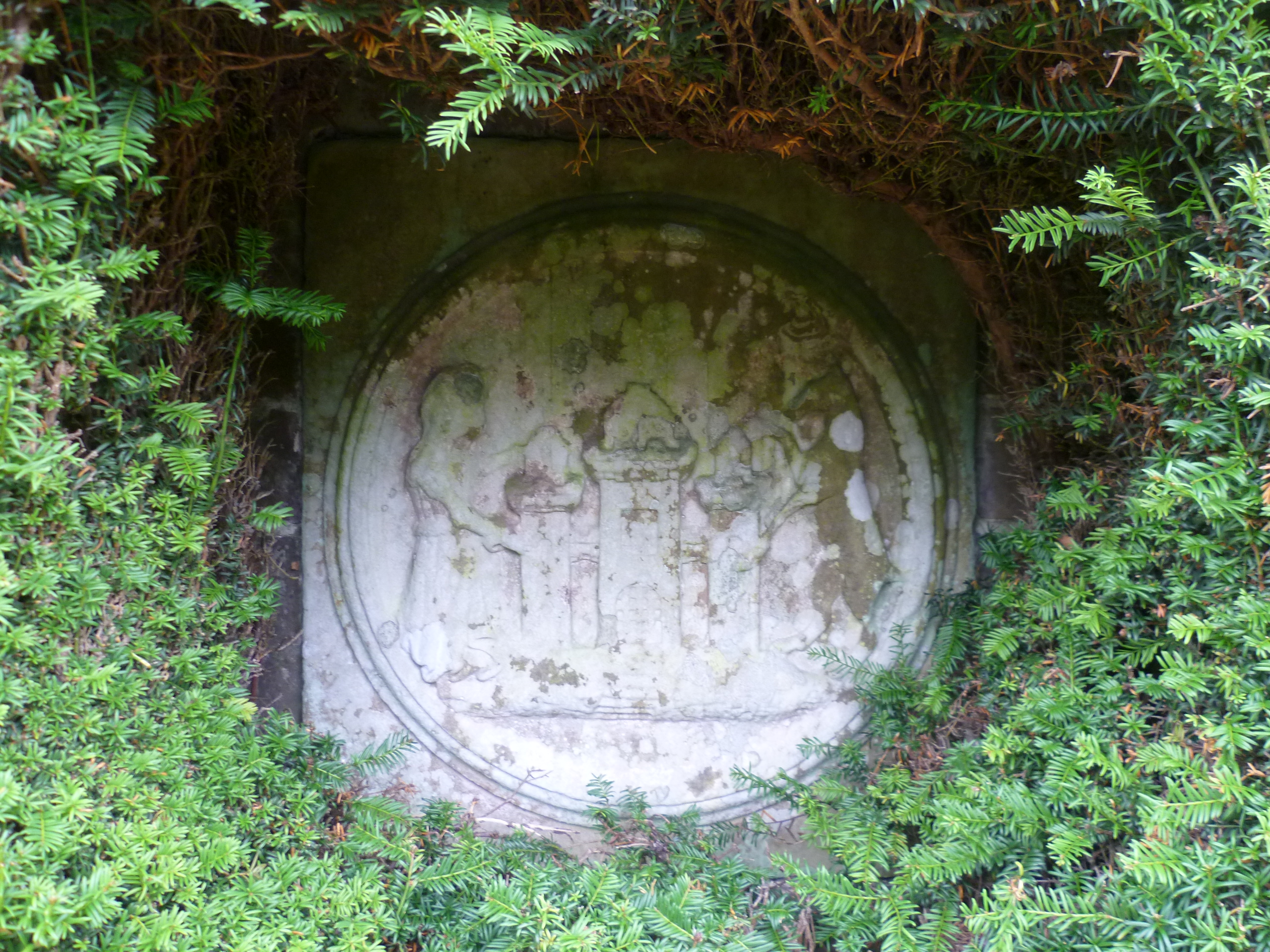

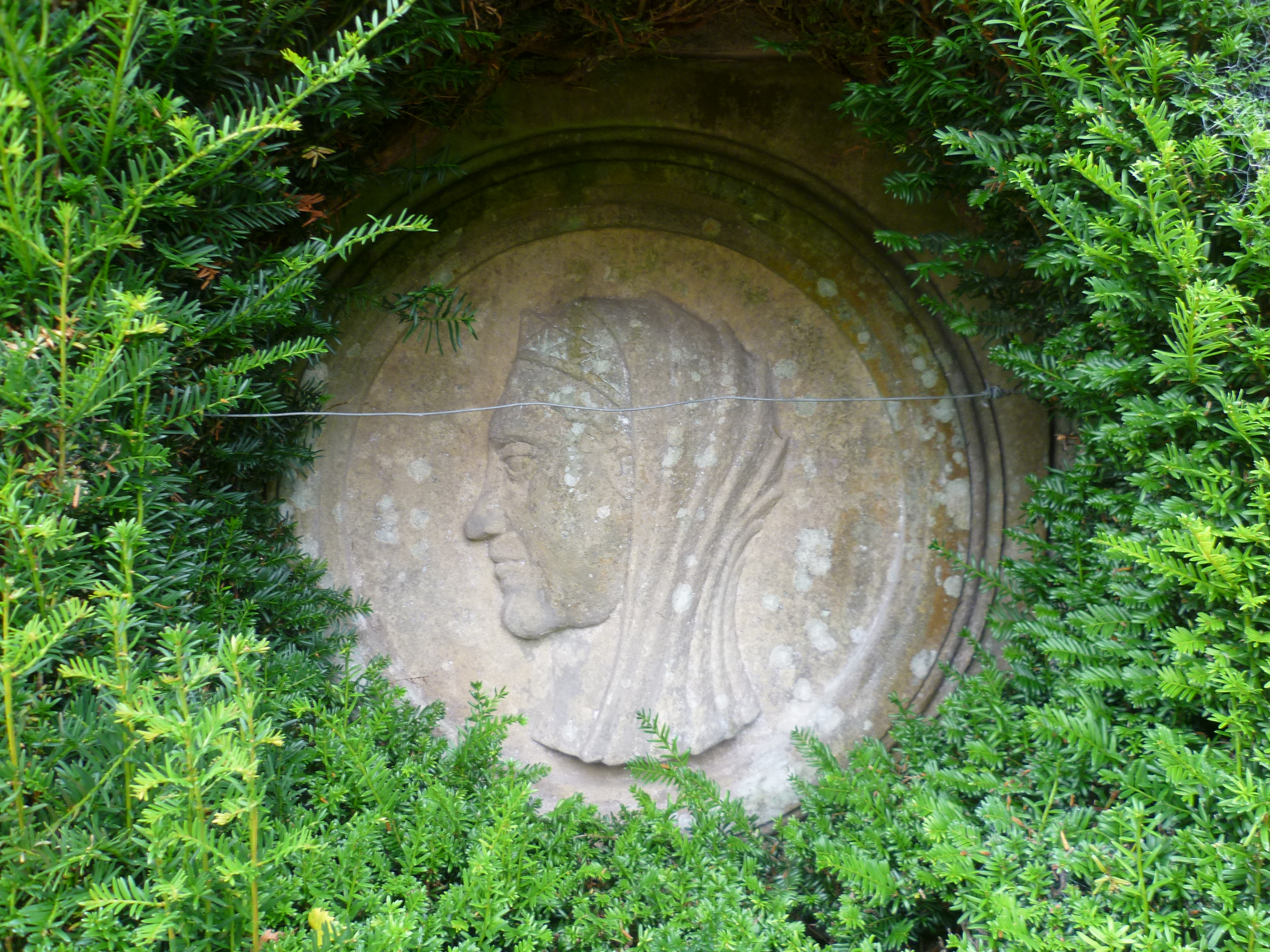

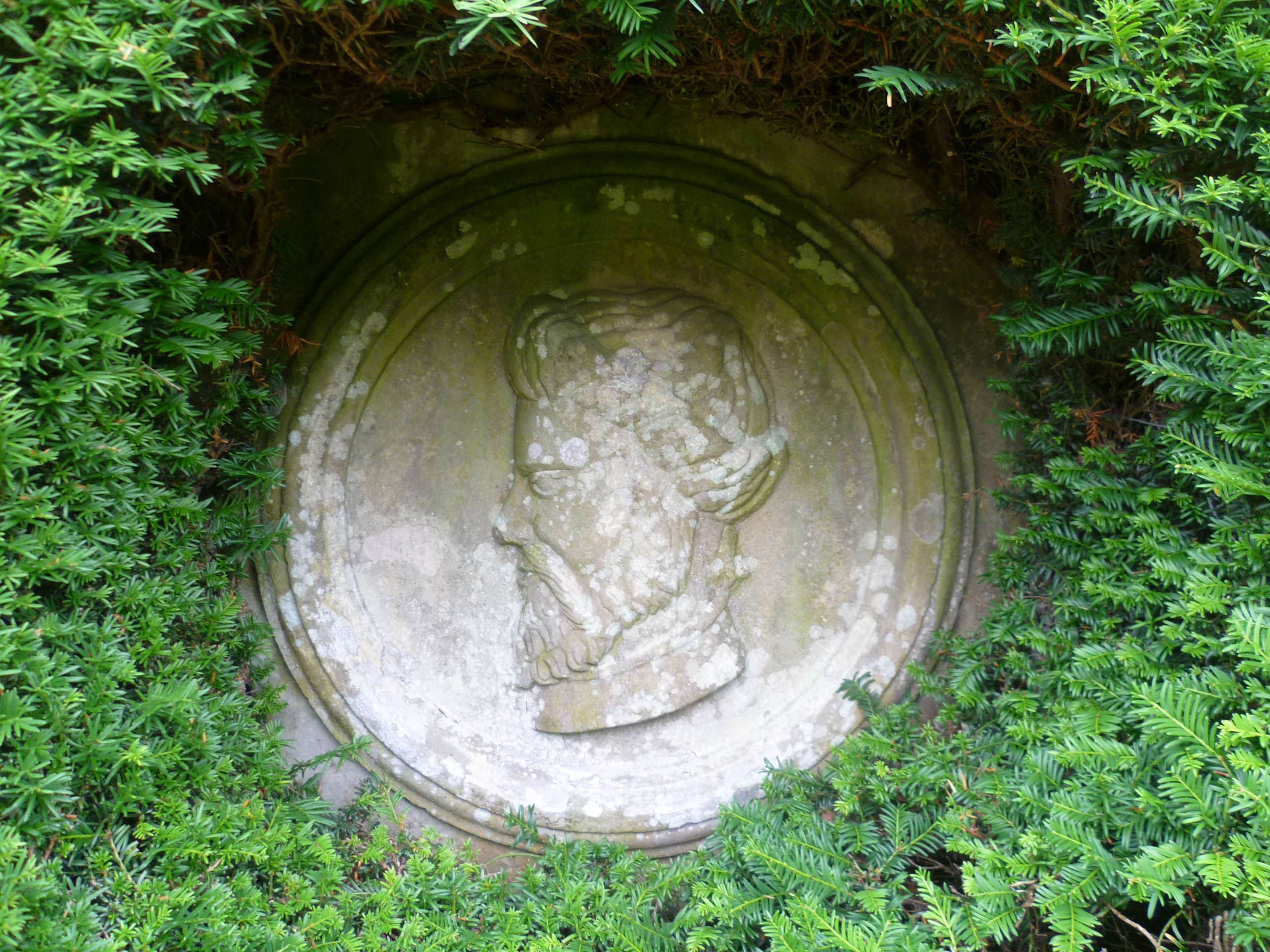

== See also ==
- John Amyatt
- Peter Williamson's "Penny Post"
