= Old Tolbooth, Edinburgh =

Former municipal building in Edinburgh, Scotland

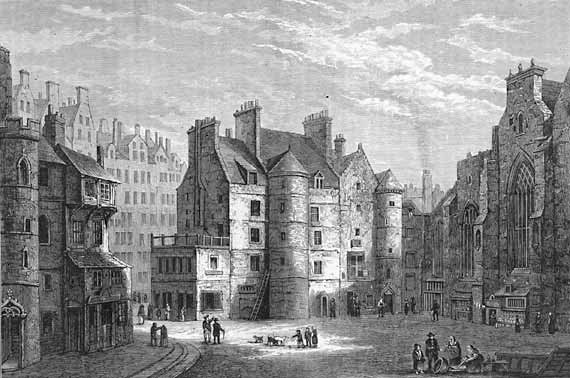
- An 18th or 19th c. engraving, after an 18th c. painting by Alexander Nasmyth
- Former names: Pretorium Burgi

General information
- Type: Municipal building
- Architectural style: Scottish Medieval
- Location: High Street, Edinburgh, Scotland
- Coordinates: 55°56′57.95″N 3°11′30.21″W
- Construction started: 1386
- Completed: c. 1400
- Renovated: 1561
- Demolished: 1817

The Old Tolbooth was an important municipal building in the city of Edinburgh, Scotland, for more than 400 years. The medieval structure, which was located at the northwest corner of St Giles' Cathedral and was attached to the west end of the Luckenbooths on the High Street in the Old Town, was first established in the 14th century by royal charter. Over the years it served a variety of purposes such as housing the Burgh Council, early meetings of the Parliament of Scotland and the Court of Session. The Tolbooth was also the burgh's main jail where, in addition to incarceration, physical punishment and torture were routinely conducted. From 1785 public executions were carried out. In 1817 the buildings, which had been rebuilt and renovated several times, were demolished.

== History ==
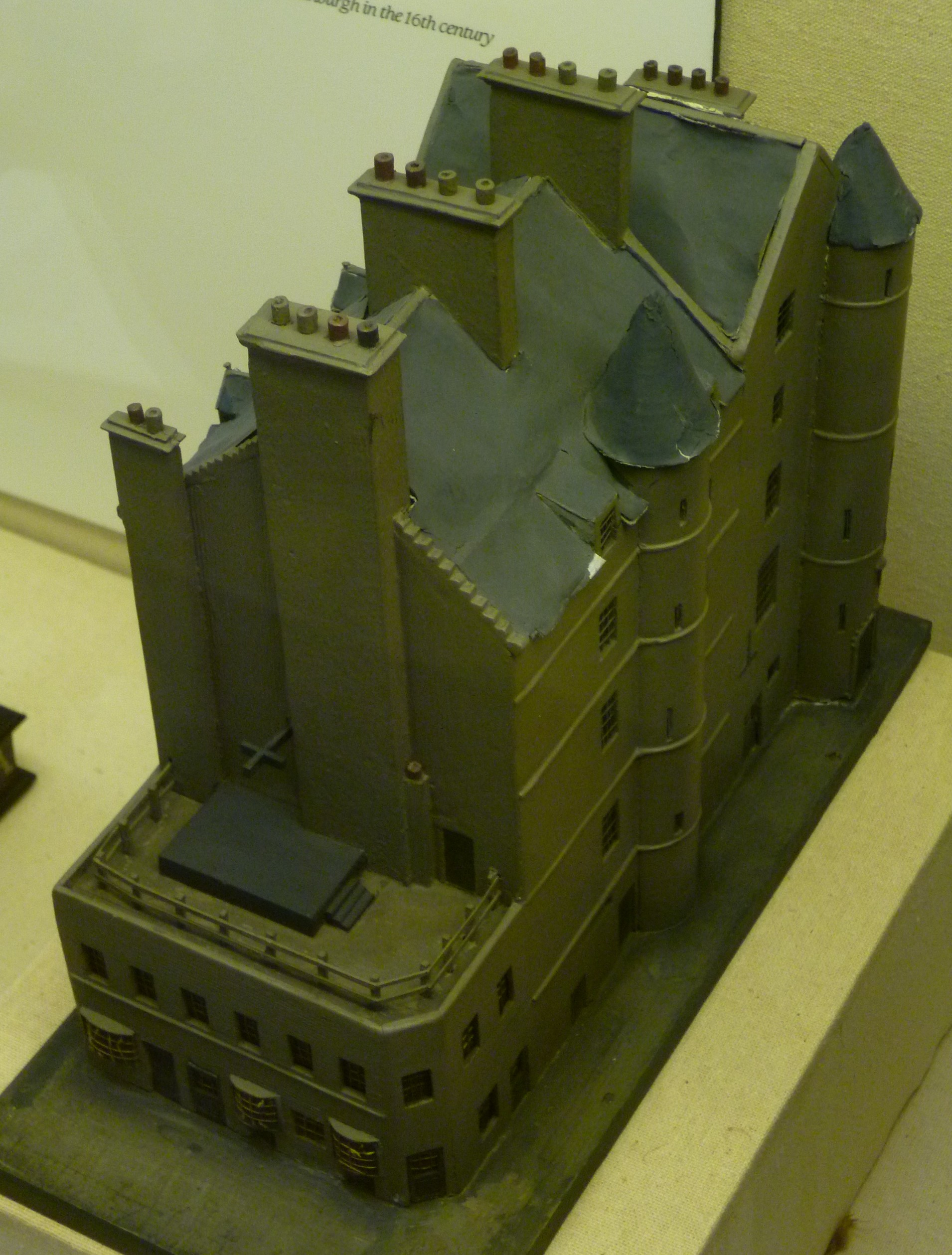
Model of the Old Tolbooth, exhibited in the Museum of Edinburgh in Huntly House on The Canongate. The execution platform can be seen projecting from the building.

A deed in the chartulary of St Giles' Cathedral indicates there was already a pretorium (an earlier Latin term for a tolbooth) in Edinburgh as early as 1368. Following the burnings of Edinburgh by Edward II of England in 1323 and his son, Edward III, in 1335 during the Wars of Scottish Independence and again in 1385 when Richard II of England burned the town, major rebuilding and improvements were required. In 1386, Robert II granted Edinburgh a charter which gave the burgh an area of land 60 feet (18 m) by 30 feet (9.1 m) in the market place with licence to develop the site for the ornament and use of the city. The charter, written in Latin, was endorsed "Carta fundi de la Belhous" (English: Charter of the site of the Belhous), signifying the purpose of the site for a new Belhouse, successor to the earlier pretorium, and may be translated:

Know ye, that we have given, granted, and by this our present charter have confirmed, to our beloved and faithful, the Burgesses and Community of Edinburgh, and their successors in time to come, 60 feet in length and 30 feet in breadth of land lying in the market place of the said burgh, on the north side of the street thereof; giving and granting to them, and their foresaid successors, our special license to construct and erect houses and buildings on the foresaid land, for the ornament of the said burgh, and for their necessary use.

There is no record of construction on the site but, on 3 October 1403, the earliest burgh record mentions the "Pretorio burgi" – the Pretorium of Edinburgh – for the first time. On 27 November 1438, during the reign of James II, the Estates of Parliament made its first use of the pretorio burgi of Edinburgh. Parliamentary records of 28 June 1451, by which time records were made in Scots, see the first official use of the term tolbooth (or, strictly, tolbuith)

The land granted by the royal charter was located just a few feet from the north-west corner of St Giles' Cathedral. The construction of the Tolbooth substantially reduced the width of the street at this point. A pattern of setts known as the Heart of Midlothian currently mark the entrance to the original building.

The bellhouse (or belhous) of a burgh often had a steeple or tower that contained a civic bell, the ringing of which was used to regulate the business and civil matters of the burgh. In Edinburgh, the pretorium and belhous appear to have much the same meaning, being the burghal offices. The timberwork of the belfry was renewed in 1555, hauled into place by a team of 28 men led by a French craftsman Andrew Mansioun.

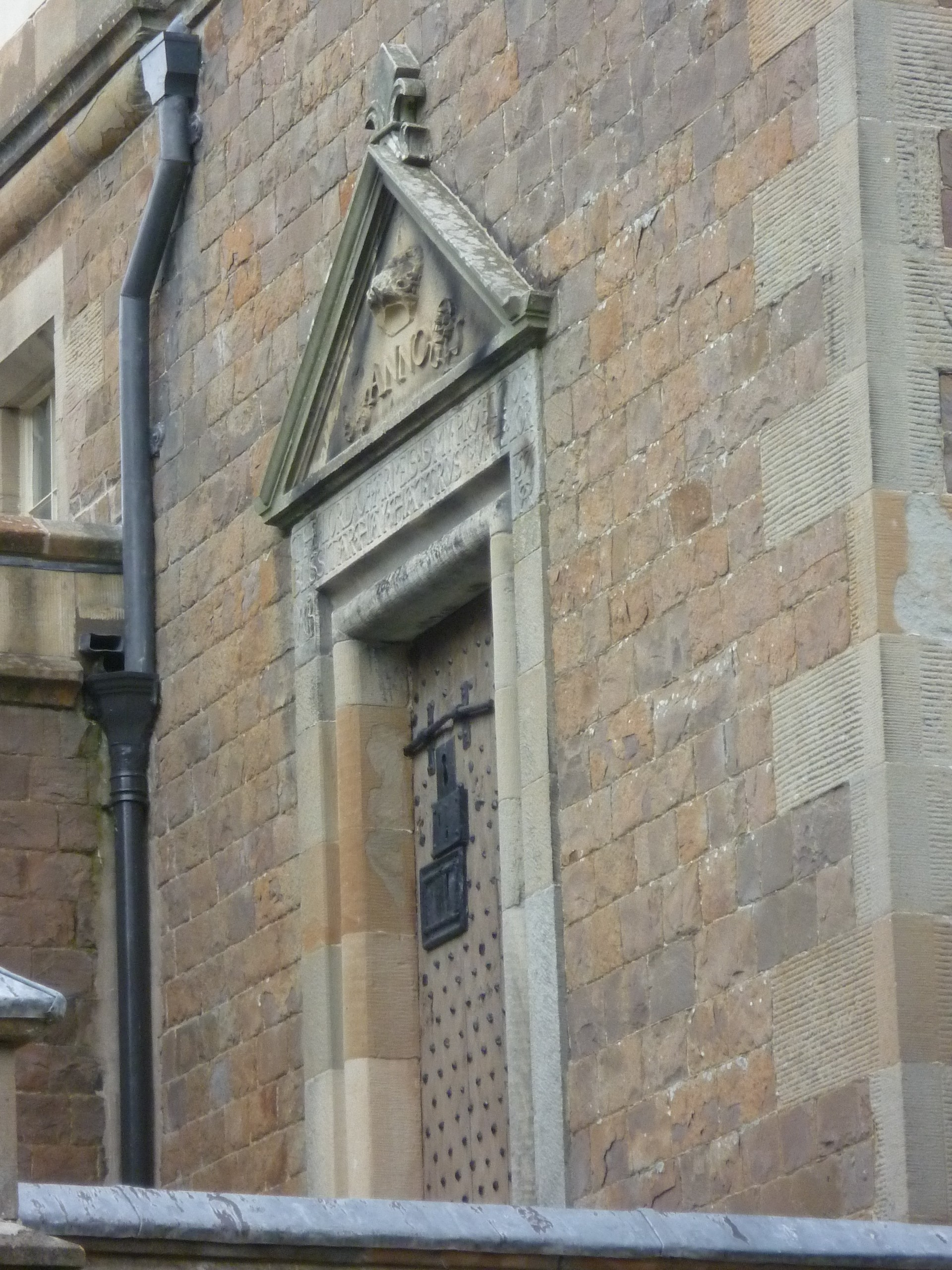
Door of the tolbooth, built into a side wall of Sir Walter Scott's House at Abbotsford

By the reign of Mary, Queen of Scots, the Tolbooth was in a chronic state of disrepair. On 6 February 1562, the queen ordered that it should be demolished and rebuilt. In response, the town council partitioned off the west end of St Giles' which was then used for meetings of Parliament and the Court of Session. At the same time, a building was constructed at the south-west corner of St Giles' Cathedral for sittings of the Burgh Council. Confusingly, both were often called the New Tolbooth. Several masons were involved in the project, and Nicol Anderson and William Bell were rewarded by being made burgesses of Edinburgh.

After the murder of Lord Darnley in February 1567, James Murray of Pardewis set up painted papers on the Tolbooth door slandering Mary, Queen of Scots. In October 1571, during the Marian Civil War, a chronicle reports that the tower of the Old Tolbooth was taken down, "the tour of the auld Tolbuyth was tane doun". In 1632 the new building to the south was demolished.

In 1639, the Parliament of Scotland moved into the new Parliament Hall which had been built by the Town Council of Edinburgh at its own expense. The Old Tolbooth remained in use by the Burgh council as a prison. In 1811 the council moved across the street to the north range of the Royal Exchange building which was termed the City Chambers rather than the Tolbooth. This building had been built 1754–61 to a design by John Adam of 1753.

The Old Tolbooth continued be used as a prison and place of execution until it was finally demolished in 1817.

Sir Walter Scott featured the Old Tolbooth prominently in his work The Heart of Midlothian. Published in 1818, the year after the demolition of the building, the book is set against the backdrop of the Porteous Riots in 1736. Scott attended the building's demolition and obtained the iron entrance door to the Old Tolbooth's jail and its key and incorporated the door into his new mansion of Abbotsford House near Melrose in the Scottish Borders.

== Prison ==
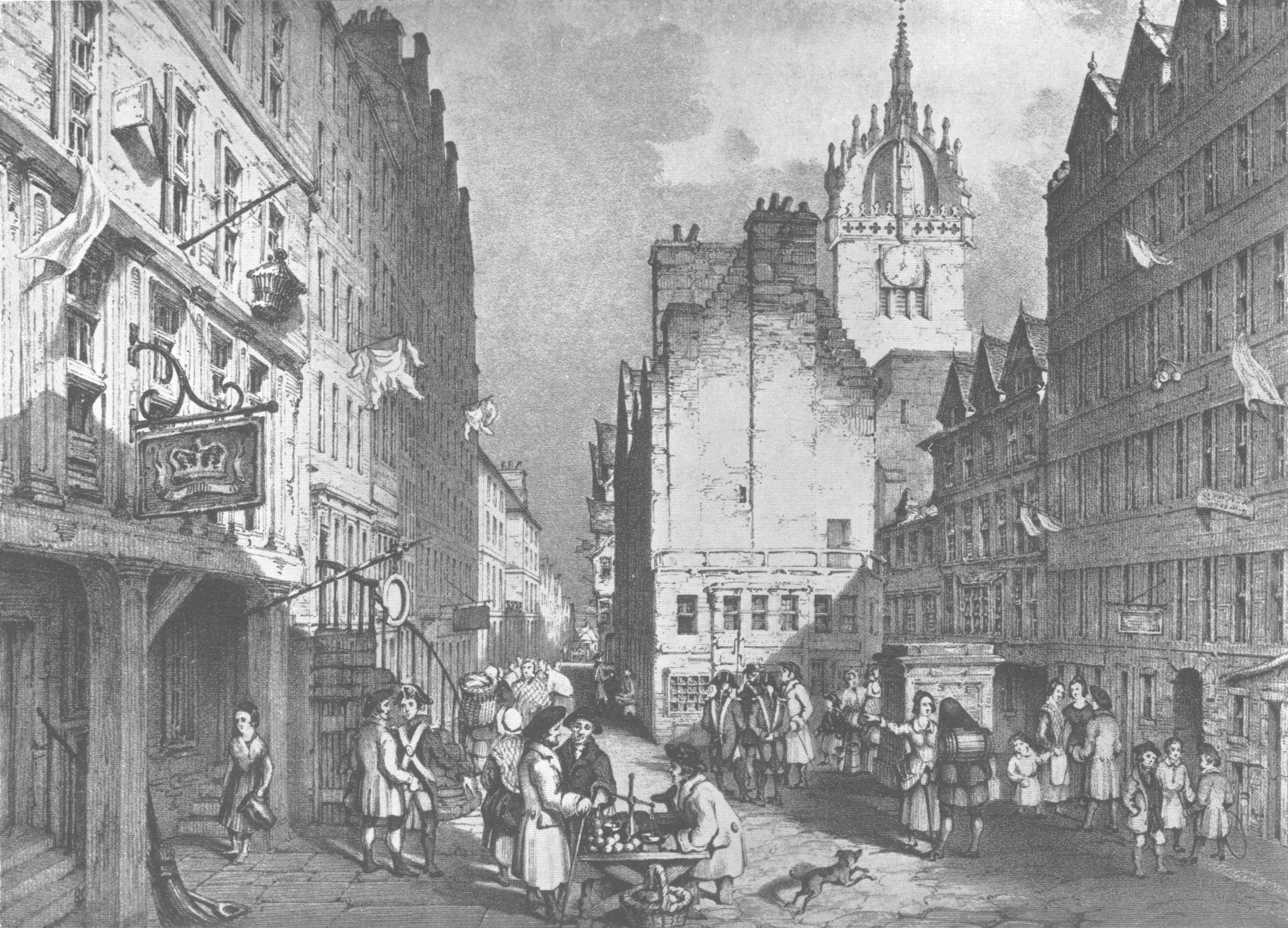
An early 19th-century engraving showing the west gable of the "Heart of Midlothian" (centre right).

The Old Tolbooth was used as a jail where judicial torture was routinely carried out. From 1785 executions, which previously had taken place at the Mercat Cross or the Grassmarket, were carried out on the roof of a two-storey extension on the west side of the Old Tolbooth which provided a platform equipped with a gallows so that the public could view hangings. Prisoners taken to the Old Tolbooth were tortured using implements such as the boot or pilliwinks. Jougs were attached to the exterior of the building. These were iron collars for chaining up offenders in public view, like a pillory.

Spikes were also employed to exhibit body parts taken from executed prisoners. The heads of the most notorious were placed on "the prick of the highest stone": a spike on the Old Tolbooth's northern gable facing the High Street. For instance the Regent Morton's head was stuck there from 1581 for 18 months. The head of Montrose was on view from 1650 to 1660 until replaced by the Marquis of Argyll's head in 1661.

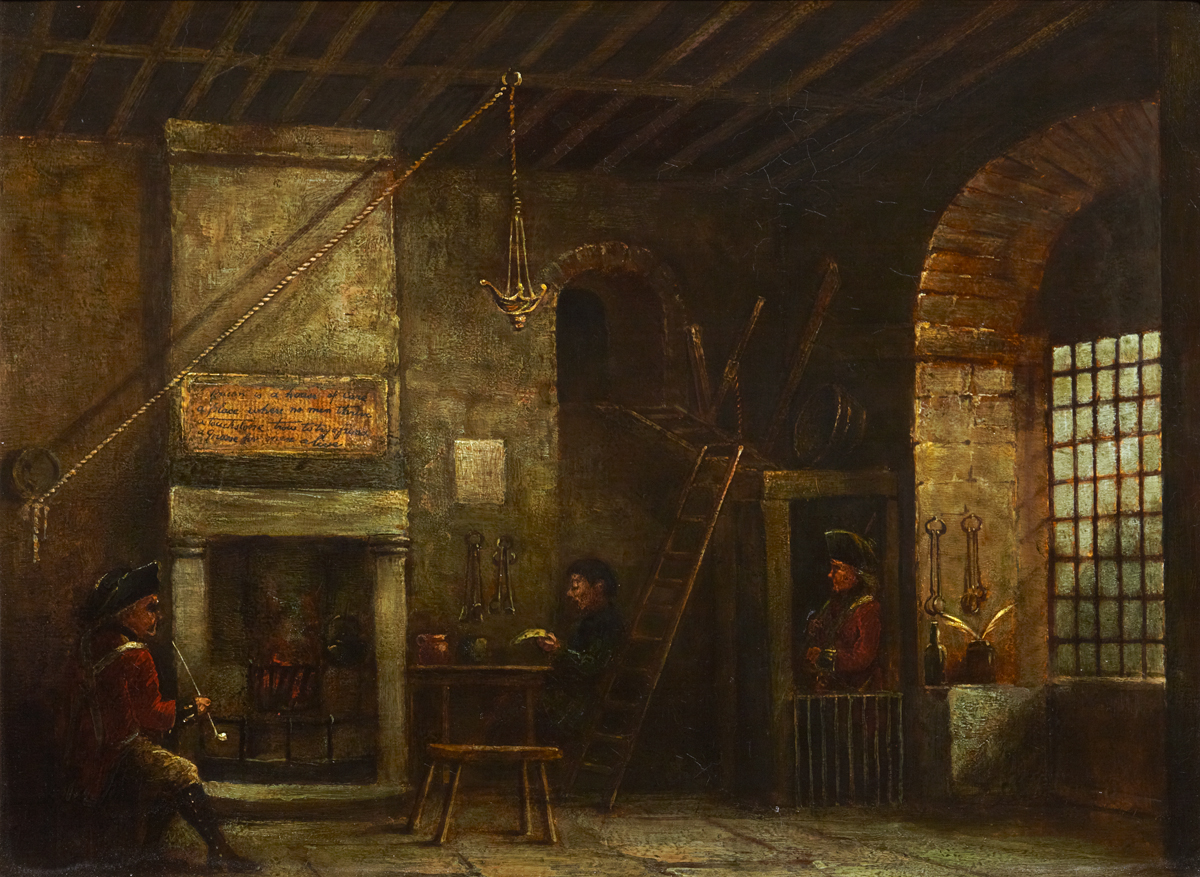
Hall of the Old Tolbooth, c.1795

Edinburgh's foremost 18th century historian, Hugo Arnot, wrote the following detailed description of the prison to expose the shocking conditions within.

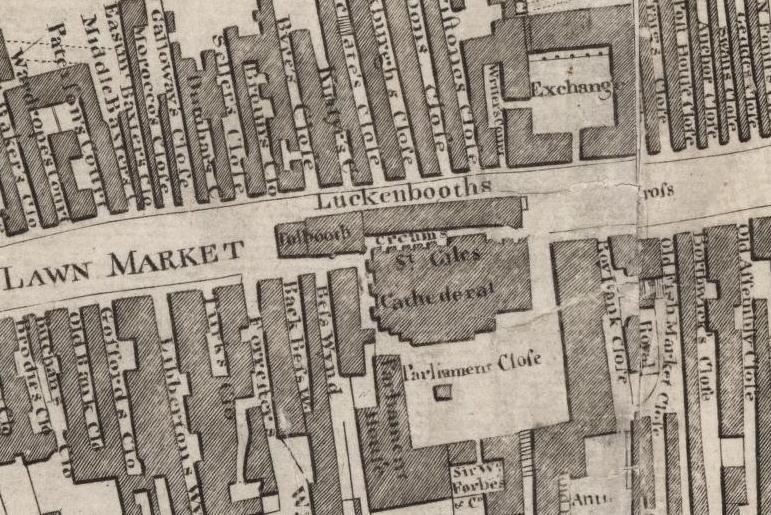
The tolbooth shown on a town plan drawn in Arnot's time (1784). It stands on the left of the adjoining row of shops known as the Luckenbooths.

The liberality and humanity of the English, in erecting so magnificent a building for a jail as Newgate, deserve the highest applause. (...) The state of Edinburgh tolbooth is far otherwise. There the austerity of the law, and the rigour of an unfeeling creditor, may be gratified, in their utmost extent. In the heart of a great city, it is not accommodated with ventilators, with water-pipe, with privy. The filth collected in the jail is thrown into a hole within the house at the foot of a stair, which, it is pretended, communicates with a drain; but, if so, it is so compleatly chocked, as to serve no other purpose but that filling the jail with disagreeable stench. This is the more inexcusable, since, by making a drain to the north, over a very narrow street, such a declivity might be reached, that, with the help of water, of which there is command, the sewer might be kept perfectly clean. When we visited the jail there were confined in it about twenty-nine prisoners, partly debtors, partly delinquents; four or five were women, and there were five boys. Some of these had what is called the freedom of the prison, that is, not being confined to a single apartment. As these people had the liberty of going up and down stairs, they kept their rooms tolerably clean swept. They had beds belonging to themselves; and in one room, we observed a pot on the fire. But, wherever we found the prisoners confined to one apartment, whether on account of their delinquencies, or that they were unable to pay for a little freedom, the rooms were destitute of all accommodation, and very nasty. All parts of the jail were kept in a slovenly condition; but the eastern quarter of it (although we had fortified ourselves against the stench), was intolerable. This consisted of three apartments, each above the other. In what length of time these rooms, and the stairs leading to them, could have collected the quantity of filth which we saw in them, we cannot determine. The undermost of these apartments was empty. In the second, which is called the iron room, which is destined for those who have received sentence of death, there were three boys: one of them might have been about fourteen, the others about twelve years of age. They had been confined about three weeks for thievish practices. In the corner of the room, we saw; shoved together, a quantity of dust, rags, and straw, the refuse of a long succession of criminals. The straw had been originally put into the room for them to lie upon, but had been suffered to remain till, worn by successive convicts, it was chopped into bits of two inches long. From this, we went to the apartment above, where were two miserable boys, not twelve years of age. But there we had no leisure for observation; for, no sooner was the door opened, than such an insufferable stench assailed us, from the stagnant and putrid air of the room, as, notwithstanding our precautions, utterly to overpower us.

=== Famous inmates held in the Old Tolbooth ===
- Thomas Aikenhead
- Archibald Campbell, 1st Marquis of Argyll
- Robert Balfour, 5th Lord Balfour of Burleigh
- Deacon Brodie
- James Douglas, 4th Earl of Morton
- John Fian
- James Graham, 1st Marquis of Montrose
- Alexander Home, 3rd Lord Home
- Archibald Johnston, Lord Warriston
- Alexander Peden
- Sawney Bean
- Captain John Porteous
- Agnes Sampson
- Archibald Wauchope of Niddrie
- Thomas Weir
- James Wood of Bonnyton

== Other tolbooths in Edinburgh ==
Due to enlargement of the city Edinburgh now encompasses other tolbooths or tolbooth sites. Still in existence are Canongate Tolbooth on the lower section of the Royal Mile, South Queensferry Tolbooth and the tolbooth in Dean Village.

Leith, the port for Edinburgh had its own tolbooth, located on what is still called Tolbooth Wynd. The baronies of Broughton and Restalrig also had tolbooths.

== Sources ==
- Skelton, Douglas. Dark Heart, tales from Edinburgh's town jail. Mainstream, Edinburgh 2008

Preceded by Church of the Friars Preachers of Blessed Virgin and Saint Dominic	Home of the Parliament of Scotland; 1438–1563	Succeeded by St Giles' Cathedral
