= Luckenbooths =

Former tenements in Edinburgh, Scotland

Coordinates: 55.9497°N 3.1910°W

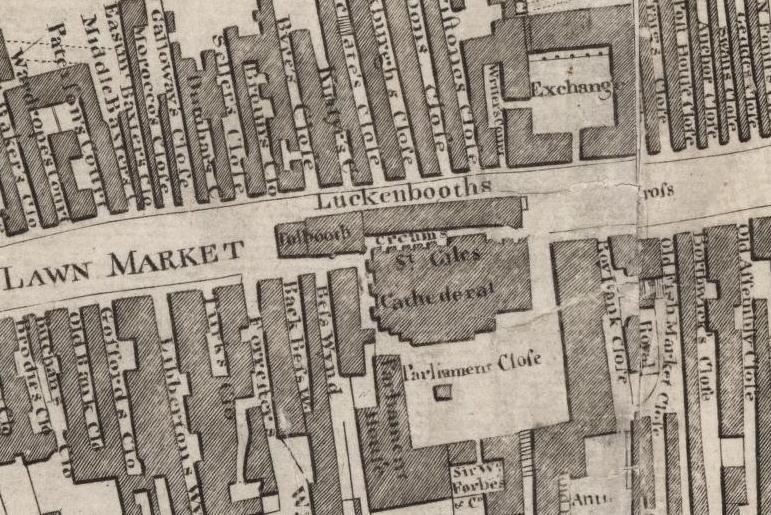
The Luckenbooths shown on a plan of Edinburgh in 1784 (See also external link at foot of page)

The Luckenbooths were a range of tenements which formerly stood immediately to the north of St. Giles' Kirk in the High Street of Edinburgh from the reign of King James II in the 15th century to the early years of the 19th century. They were demolished in 1802, apart from the east end of the block which was removed in 1817.

== History and description ==
The building which housed them originated as a two storey, timber-fronted tenement built in 1440 and known as the "Buith Raw" (Scots for booth row). Over the years, the row was extended and heightened until it consisted of seven tenement buildings of varying height, date and form, stretching the full length of St. Giles' from which it was separated by a narrow alleyway. At some point, the row of tenements took on the name of "Luckenbuiths" from the lockable booths situated at street level. The earliest reference to the name Luckenbooths is in a sasine of 1521 where it is said (in Latin) to be commonly known as the Lukkynbuthis.

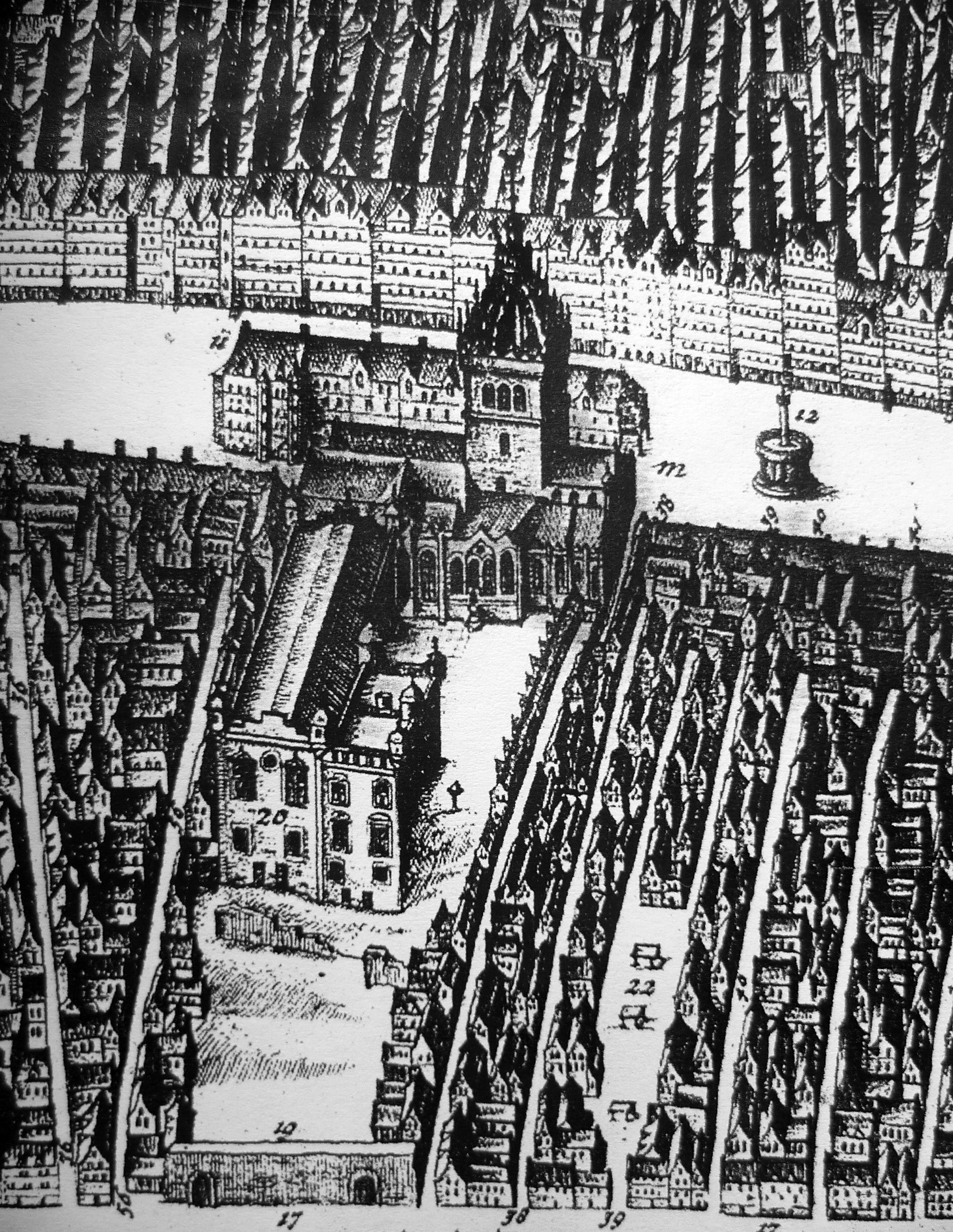
Detail from James Gordon of Rothiemay's map of Edinburgh 1647. The building beyond St. Giles is the row of open-fronted shops called the Luckenbooths.

These ancient buildings, with their varied frontages and roof-lines, formed a picturesque feature in the High Street. The west-most tenement was contiguous with the Belhouse of the Old Tolbooth. The timber-fronted "land" immediately in front of the steeple of St. Giles' was only three storeys high with a low-pitched roof so that the clock on St. Giles' (since removed) could be seen by passers-by in the High Street while its neighbour to the west rose to six storeys. The two most easterly lands were newer and substantial building of polished ashlar. The first of these was apparently built not later than the reign of Charles I. The east-most was built at the end of the 17th century and presented its main front down the High Street.

The frontages of the Luckenbooths were in line with the north front of the Old Tolbooth but the buildings were not as deep, leaving an alleyway between their rear and St. Giles'. A passage or pend known as the Auld Kirk Style provided access from the front of the Luckenbooths through to the old north door of St. Giles'. This passage was also known as the "Stinking Style", as criticised by the poet William Dunbar in his address To the Merchants of Edinburgh, c.1500 ("Your Stinkand Stull that standis dirk [darkly], Haldis the lycht fra your parroche kirk.").

From early times, the traders of Edinburgh would have sold their goods from stalls set up in one of the city's market places. The Buith Raw provided a more permanent base and incorporated shops as an integral part of the ground floor. Part of the street frontage consisted of heavy folding boards which would be open by day, one board being drawn up to form an overhang to protect the stock, another let down to form a counter board to display goods, with others folded back to the side. A reconstruction of this form of shop front can be seen at Gladstone's Land in the Lawnmarket.

The alleyway between the Luckenbooths and St. Giles' was occupied by a number of open stalls known as the crames or krames (cf. old German krâmer for pedlar) which were positioned between the buttresses of the church.

Walter Scott's novel The Heart of Midlothian, published in 1818, includes the following description of the Luckenbooths shortly before their disappearance,

He stood now before the Gothic entrance of the ancient prison, which, as is well known to all men, rears its ancient front in the very middle of the High Street, forming, as it were, the termination to a huge pile of buildings called the Luckenbooths, which, for some inconceivable reason, our ancestors had jammed into the midst of the principal street of the town, leaving for passage a narrow street on the north, and on the south, into which the prison opens, a narrow crooked lane, winding betwixt the high and sombre walls of the tolbooth and the adjacent houses on the one side, and the buttresses and projections of the old Cathedral upon the other. To give some gaiety to this sombre passage (well known by the name of the Krames), a number of little booths, or shops, after the fashion of cobblers' stalls, are plastered, as it were, against the Gothic projections and abutments, so that it seemed as if the traders had occupied with nests, bearing the same proportion to the building, every buttress and coign of vantage, as the martlet did in Macbeth's Castle. Of later years these booths have degenerated into mere toy-shops, where the little loiterers chiefly interested in such wares are tempted to linger, enchanted by the rich display of hobby-horses, babies [i.e. dolls], and Dutch toys, arranged in artful and gay confusion; yet half-scared by the cross looks of the withered pantaloon, or spectacled old lady, by whom these tempting stores are watched and superintended. But, in the times we write of, the hosiers, the glovers, the hatters, the mercers, the milliners, and all who dealt in the miscellaneous wares now termed haberdashers' goods, were to be found in the narrow alley.

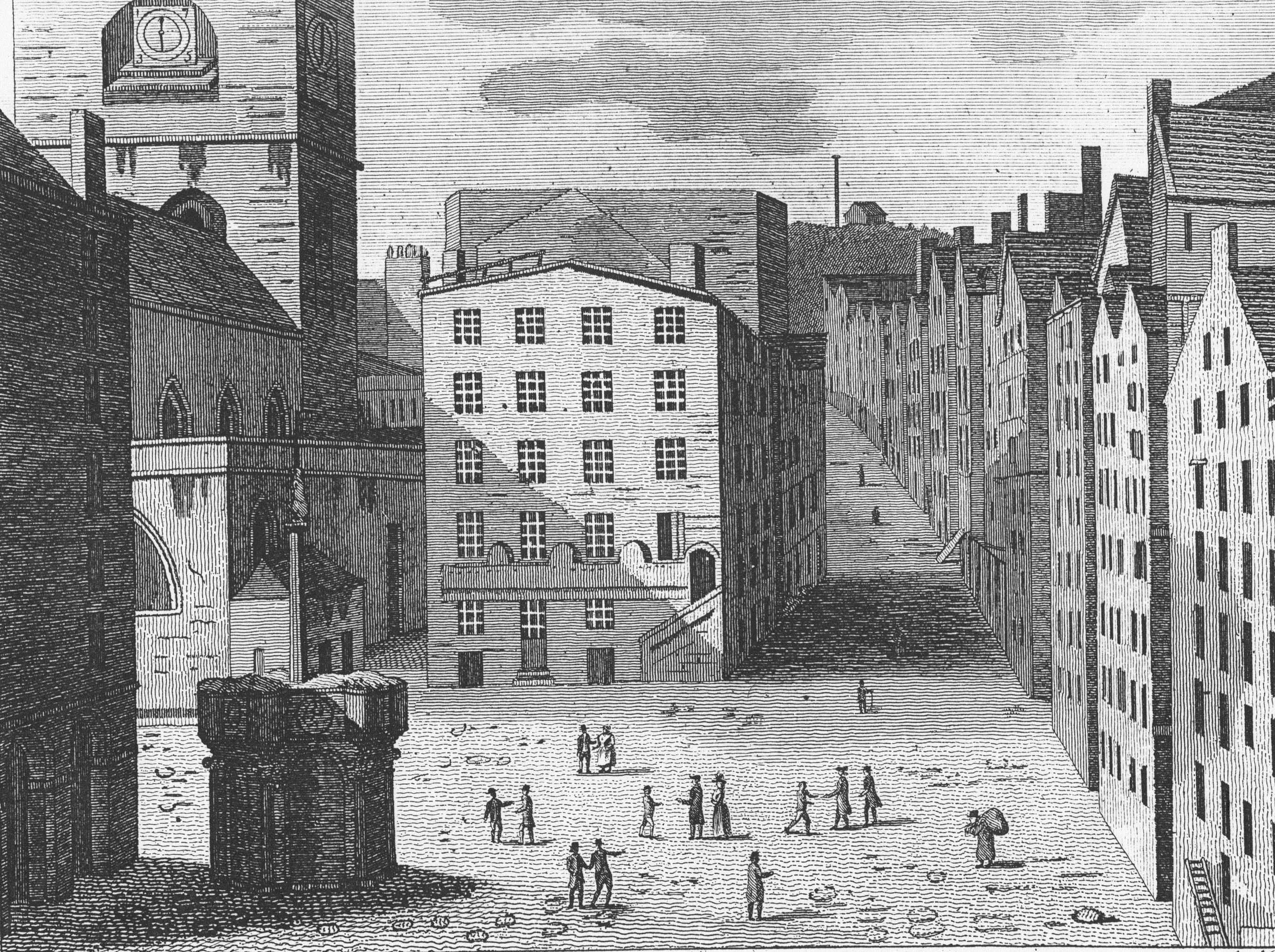
Creech's Land in 1791

The east end of the block, facing down the High Street, was the tenement where the wigmaker and poet Allan Ramsay had his shop on the first floor. It was here in 1752 that he established Scotland's first "circulating library" (for borrowing books), which became a favourite meeting-place for the literati of the time. Patrons included the poet John Gay of The Beggar's Opera fame during his residence in the city and the novelist Tobias Smollett. The publisher William Creech took the unit over in the late 18th century and it was thereafter known as "Creech's Land", much visited by Robert Burns. Henry Cockburn recalled Creech's shop as "the natural resort of lawyers, authors, and all sorts of literary idlers... All who wished to see a poet or a stranger, or to hear the public news, the last joke by Erskine, or yesterday's occurrences in the Parliament House, or to get the publications of the day, or newspapers - all congregated there, lawyers, doctors, clergymen and authors."

Smollett wrote that the High Street "would undoubtedly be one of the noblest streets in Europe, if an ugly mass of mean buildings, called the Lucken-Booths, had not thrust itself, by what accident I know not, into the middle of the way, like Middle-Row in Holborn".

The Luckenbooths reduced the width of the High Street on the other side of the building to only 14/15 feet, thus causing congestion, especially to wheeled traffic. The block was consequently demolished by 1817 after the Town Council, desirous of city street improvements, had deemed it a major obstruction.

James Ballantine's poem Lament For Ancient Edinburgh, published in 1856, expressed a nostalgic sense of loss for the vanished krames.

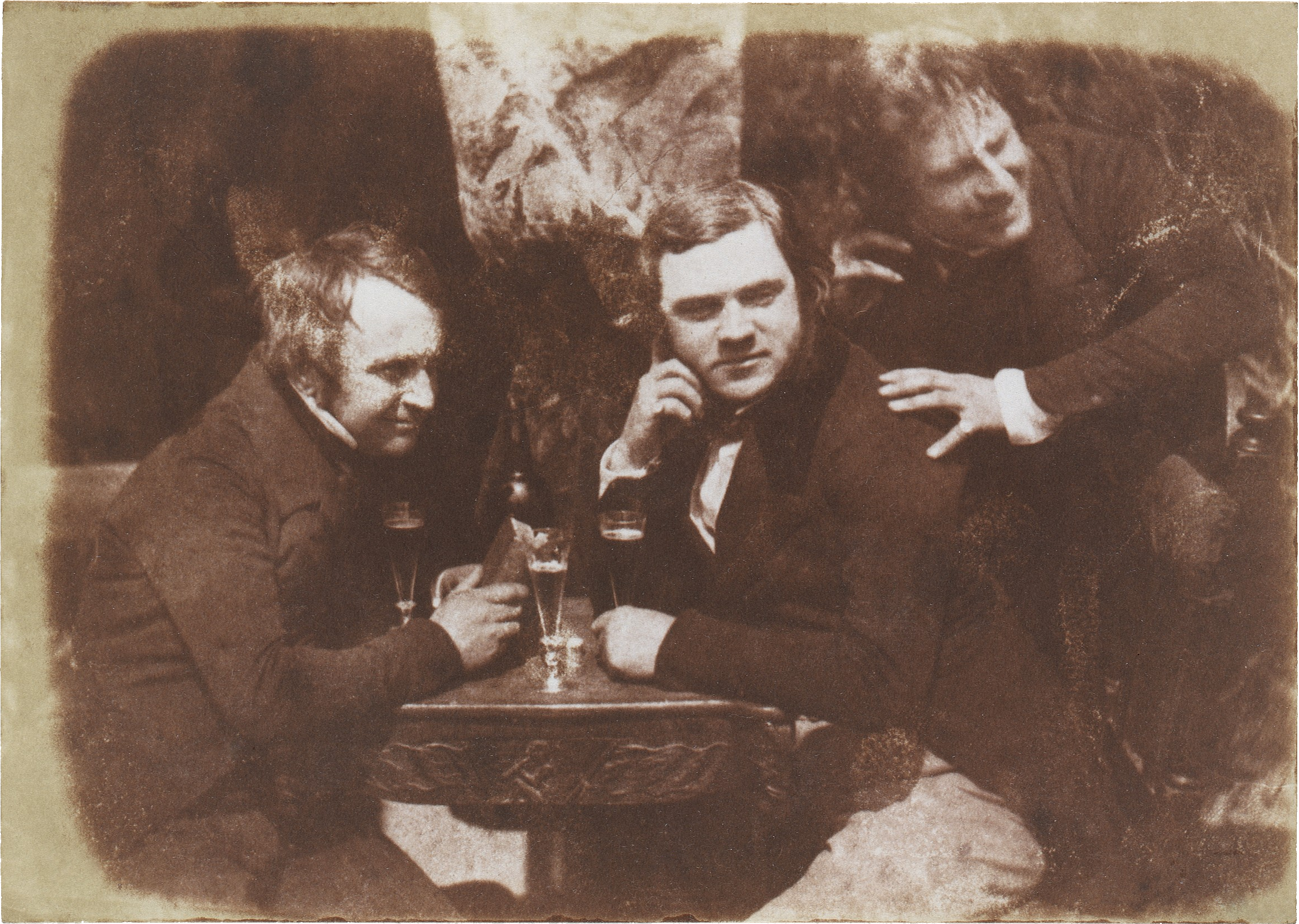
The poem's author (left) with Dr. George Bell and David Octavius Hill in the 1840s

The ancient Krames whaur weanies tottit [infants tottered]
Whaur a' wee wairdless callants [spendthrift boys] trottit
Though scantly fed, and scrimply coatit [ill-clad]
To spend their a'
On dirlin' [beating] drums or ba's [balls] that stottit
Against the wa' [wall].

Whaur wee lead penny watches glanced,
Whaur wee pig [clay] penny horses pranced,
Whaur crowds o' bairnies [small children] gazed entranced
While timmer tumblers [wooden acrobats] swung an' danced
A' round in rings,
On horse-hair strings.

An' bawbee Dalls [halfpenny dolls] the fashions apit,
Sae rosy cheekit, jimpy shapit [neatly turned out],
An' wee bit lassies gazed an' gapit
Wi' mouth an' ee [eyes],
Till frae their mithers they had scrapit [scrounged]
The prized bawbee.

== Shops and Other Uses ==
- Allan Ramsay had the eastmost unit, containing his circulating library. This was later purchased by William Creech (who published the Edinburgh edition of Robert Burns’ poems from here). It was thereafter known as Creech’s Land until its demolition.
- Peter Williamson (alias, "Indian Peter") ran his publishing business and operated the first "Penny Post" from this block.
- "The Bellhouse" attached to the eastern end of the city's Tolbooth was the meeting place of various trade guilds.
- The Tolbooth served as the city prison until 1817 when it was replaced by a new prison on the Calton Hill.
- Gilmours, a name appearing on the westmost shop only two storeys high. The flat roof of this shop served as the platform for public hangings outside the adjacent Tolbooth.

== See also ==
- Old Tolbooth, Edinburgh
