= Timeline of Glasgow history =

This article is intended to show a timeline of the history of Glasgow, Scotland, up to the present day.

== 500–1099 ==
- 543: The 12th century Bishop Jocelyn will later claim Glasgow's monastic church was founded by Saint Kentigern, also known as Saint Mungo, in this year; he also claimed that Kentigern found at Glasgow a cemetery which Saint Ninian had hallowed
- 560: Jocelyn claims Mungo/Kentigern made his first bishop in this year

== 1100–1199 ==
- 1114: Glasgow is a farming village, with a monastic church and water mill; the reach of Glasgow's bishops extends to Cumbria; the church is elevated to temporary cathedral status by young David of Strathclyde, later David I
- 1118: Building of a new cathedral begins
- 1134: The churches of Saint John and the Holy Sepulchre are in the city; the church of Saint James is dedicated
- 1136: The cathedral is consecrated in the presence of David I
- c1150: The Glasgow Fair is an eight-day event
- 1153: The sacking of Glasgow, and devastation of its surrounding countryside, by Somerled, Lord of Argyll.
- c1175/c1178: William the Lion makes Glasgow an episcopal burgh of barony, and grants Bishop Jocelyn a charter
- 1179?-1199?: Bishop gives abbot and convent of Melrose a plot of land in Glasgow
- 1199: Death of Bishop Jocelyn

== 1200–1299 ==
- 1220s: Early trades in the town include fishermen, millers, bakers, cobblers, painters, and blacksmiths; wooden merchant's houses replace peasant huts
- 1240: Diocesan authorities deeply in debt to bankers from Florence; church over Saint Kentigern's grave being added
- 1246: Dominican order (Blackfriars) establish a church.
- 1258: Work on Kentigern's church complete
- 1274: Diocese includes Teviotdale in Dumfries
- 1286: Glasgow Bridge, made of timber, spans the River Clyde
- 1293: Saint Mary's church is in the town
- 1295: Saint Enoch's church is also in the town, and there is a second water mill beside the Gallowgate

== 1300–1399 ==
- 1301: Edward I of England visits Saint Kentigern's tomb in the town. Edward forces the townspeople to make a giant wooden siege tower and supply 30 wagons to transport it to Bothwell Castle to besiege it, along with tools, iron and coal; the town has trade in salmon and herring
- 1320: There is a St Thomas's Church in the town, with a Florentine Dean
- c1330-1350: The west end of the cathedral is completed
- 1350: The Black Death hits the town
- 1380-1381: The Black Death hits Glasgow again

== 1400–1499 ==
- c1400: Population estimate: 1,500-2,000
- 1410: The wooden bridge across the River Clyde is replaced by an arched stone bridge.
- 1431: William Elphinstone is born. He later obtained a papal bull for the University of Aberdeen in 1495, and was involved with the introduction of printing to Scotland in 1507
- 1450: Glasgow is a "burgh of regality"
- 1451: the University of Glasgow is established by bull of Pope Nicholas V, and founded by Bishop Turnbull, beside Blackfriars monastery
- 1453: John Stewart, Glasgow's first Provost, appointed
- 1460: There is a grammar school in the city;
- 1464: St Nicholas Hospital founded in the city
- 1471: Provands Lordship, Glasgow's oldest dwelling-house, is built
- 1475: The Greyfriars (Franciscans) are granted a tenement and lands on the High Street; St Ninian's Hospital is established
- 1478: Other stone houses are built in Glasgow
- 1492: Pope Innocent VIII makes the See of Glasgow an Archbishopric – Robert Blackadder is the city's first archbishop

== 1500–1599 ==
- c1500: Population estimate is 2,500 – 3,000
- 1504: Plague hits Glasgow; the city is eleventh among Scottish burghs for taxation revenue
- c1510: The Bishop's Palace is extended
- 1516-1559: The city's craft guilds are incorporated
- 1518: The university becomes more active
- 1520: The archdiocese now includes the former diocese of Argyll
- 1525: James Houston founds the Tron Church
- 1535-1556: Glasgow pays 1.5% – 3% of total Scottish burgh taxes
- 1544: Siege of castle; estimated population is 3,000
- 1556: Estimated population c4,500. Brewing recorded at site that will later become Wellpark Brewery
- 1560: The burgh of Glasgow is now represented in the Parliament of Scotland
- 1570: Andrew Melville rejuvenates the university
- 1574: Plague hits the city again
- c1576: The council mill is rebuilt
- 1579: The city's cathedral is saved from demolition by craftsmen threatening to riot
- 1581: Glasgow pays 66% of upper Clyde customs tax
- 1584: Plague
- 1589: Golf is played on Glasgow Green
- 1593: Emergence of the Presbytery of Glasgow in the new self-governing church
- 1594: Glasgow is now fifth in ranking of Scottish burghs, paying 4.5% of export customs

== 1600–1699 ==
- 1600: Population estimates for the city vary between 5000 and 7500
- 1604: 361 craftsmen work in fourteen trades, including two surgeons and 213 merchants
- 1605: The Trades House and Merchants House combine to form the first town council
- 1610: The General Assembly approves the restoration of diocesan episcopacy in Scotland
- 1611: Glasgow becomes a royal burgh, with a population of about 7600
- 1615: John Ogilvy, a Scottish Jesuit priest, is hanged for saying Mass
- 1621: Glasgow pays 3%-10% of Scottish customs duties
- 1625: The first quay is built at Broomielaw
- 1626: The Tolbooth is constructed
- 1636: There are 120 students at the university
- 1638: Covenanters at the General Assembly plan to abolish bishops
- 1639: Glasgow the 3rd richest burgh in Scotland, one-fifth as rich as Edinburgh; Hutcheson's Hospital is founded
- 1641: Hutchesons' Grammar School is founded for orphan boys; 50 buildings erected in Trongate
- 1645: Montrose enters city, celebrates victories
- 1645-1646: Plague hits city
- 1649: Glasgow displaces Perth as Scotland's 4th trading centre; pays 6.5% of customs duties
- 1650: Oliver Cromwell enters Glasgow while on a campaign against the Scottish Army
- 1652: Major fire makes about a thousand families homeless; an early fire engine from Edinburgh helps put out the blaze
- 1655: Glasgow trades in coal, hoops, meal, oats, butter, herring, salt, paper, prunes, timber, and hides: goat, kid, and deerskins
- 1656: Glasgow is described as a "flourishing city", with "strong stone walls"
- 1659-1665: Bridgegate merchants' house is rebuilt
- 1660: A coal pit is reported in the Gorbals
- 1661: Several pits reported
- 1662: A post office opens
- 1663: Alexander Burnet is appointed archbishop
- 1668: Land is purchased for a new harbour – later Port Glasgow
- 1669: Burnet resigns the archbishopric, objects to Act of Supremacy
- 1670: Glasgow displaces Aberdeen and Dundee to become Scotland's second trade city
- 1673: Colonel Walter Whiteford opens city's first coffee house
- 1675: Magistrates take action against unauthorised prayer meetings
- 1677: Another major fire hits the city, destroying 130 shops and houses
- 1678: First stagecoaches run to Edinburgh
- 1680: The city's population is perhaps around 12,000, with 450 traders, 100 trading overseas
- 1688: Broomielaw Quay is reconstructed following dredging of the River Clyde
- 1690 Glasgow is re-chartered as a royal burgh; the city has an early Bank of Scotland branch

== 1700–1799 ==
- 1702: the University of Glasgow has around 400 students
- 1706: Anti-unionists riot; Glasgow is a major smuggling port
- 1707: Act of Union
- 1710: The city's population is estimated to be 13,000; over 200 shops are open; much of the city is liable to flooding
- 1712: Glasgow owners own 4% of Scottish fleet, 46 vessels
- 1715: Glasgow Courant newspaper first published
- 1718: Possible date for first Glasgow vessel to sail to America
- 1719: Cotton printing has begun
- 1720: Glasgow's estimated population is 15,000
- 1721-1735: James Anderson builds "Andersontown" (modern-day Anderston) village
- 1725: Glasgow occupied by General Wade's army; protests and street violence against liquor tax
- 1726: Daniel Defoe describes Glasgow as "The cleanest and best-built city in Britain"; 50 ships a year sail to America
- 1729: The Glasgow Journal newspaper is published
- 1730: The Glasgow Linen Society is formed
- 1735: The city's ship-owners own 67 ships
- 1736: The first history of Glasgow is published by John McUre
- 1737-1760: A new Town Hall is built west of the Tolbooth
- 1738: The Anderston Weavers' Society is formed
- 1740: Approximately 685,000 m of linen is made in Glasgow, some of which is sent to London. Hugh and Robert Tennent take over the Drygate Brewery
- 1740-1741: The Foulis brothers begin printing
- 1742: Delft pottery is manufactured in the city
- 1743: The Foulis brothers become printers to the university
- 1745: Charles Edward Stuart (Bonnie Prince Charlie) enters the city with his army; Tennents open a new brewery in Glasgow
- 1749: A stage coach service opens between Edinburgh and Glasgow
- 1750: There are five sugar refineries in the city
- 1751: The John Smith bookshop is established
- 1753: Foulis Academy is established at the university to promote art and design; turnpiking of main roads from Glasgow; the city's involvement in the tobacco trade is reflected in the naming of Virginia Street
- 1755: The estimated population of Glasgow is 23,500
- 1757: 2.2 million metres of linen are produced in the city
- 1760: Glasgow enjoys a wave of prosperity; there are 13 professors at Glasgow University
- 1762: Joseph Black discovers latent heat
- 1763: David Dale opens a draper's shop in the city; regular coaches run from Glasgow to Greenock
- 1769: Tennents brewers is now a large industry; James Watt patents his steam engine condenser
- 1771: The Scottish economy is boosted by trade through Glasgow
- 1775: Trade with America in tobacco, sugar, and cotton – the city's prosperity is at its height
- 1776: Adam Smith, a professor at Glasgow University, publishes Wealth of Nations
- 1779: Mobs protest against the Catholic Relief Act
- 1780: The estimated population of Glasgow is 42,000; the construction of the Forth and Clyde Canal is completed
- 1781: Vessels of over 30 tons can now reach Broomielaw Quay
- 1782-1783: The Forth and Clyde Canal enables grain from London to ease famine in Glasgow
- 1783: Glasgow Chamber of Commerce is founded, it is the first in Britain
- 1785: A hot air balloonist flies from Glasgow to Hawick in the Borders; the firm of Thomsons is formed as bankers
- 1794: Glasgow Royal Infirmary opens
- 1796: The Royal Technical College (which will later become The University of Strathclyde) is founded
- 1798: The Merchant Banking Company of Glasgow fails
- 1799: Demonstrations over bread prices; trade in tobacco and rum declines

== 1800–1899 ==
- 1800: The River Clyde is 14 ft (3.1m) deep, and supports 200 wharves and jetties; there is a large Gaelic community in the city
- 1800: The Glasgow Police Act is passed by Parliament allowing the creation of the first modern preventative police force
- 1803: Dorothy Wordsworth visits Glasgow
- 1807: Hunterian Museum and Art Gallery opens off the high street, adjacent to the then campus of Glasgow University
- 1809: General Association of Operative Weavers is formed
- 1810-1814: Glasgow Asylum for Lunatics is built in Dobbies Loan
- 1813: Weavers fail in bid for fair wages
- 1814: Glasgow Green is Europe's first public park
- 1815: The Glasgow Herald is published twice-weekly
- 1817: Royal Botanic Institution of Glasgow founded by Thomas Hopkirk and others to establish a Glasgow Botanic Garden
- 1818: Gas street lights begin to be used in the city
- 1820: "Radical War"
- 1825: The University of Glasgow, still located in the High Street, has over 1200 students and about 30 professors; 10 coaches run to Edinburgh daily
- 1826: Glasgow City Mission, the first City Mission, is established on 1 January by David Nasmith
- 1827: The Argyll Arcade opens
- 1828: James Beaumont Neilson makes breakthrough in iron-smelting technology; a total abstinence society is formed
- 1832: The city benefits from increased representation under the Great Reform Bill
- 1835–1874: The Liberals represents Glasgow in Parliament
- 1836: The Forth and Clyde Canal has increased traffic in goods and passengers
- 1837: Violent cotton-spinners strike; the leaders are sentenced to transportation
- 1841: Chartist demonstration is addressed by Fergus O'Connor
- 1842: Opening of the Edinburgh and Glasgow Railway and Glasgow Queen Street railway station; Glasgow Botanic Gardens moves to its current location
- 1843: Disruption of the Church of Scotland
- 1844: Glasgow Stock Exchange opens
- 1846: Burgh boundaries are more than doubled to 5,063 acres (20.49 km^{2})
- 1847: Swedish opera singer, Jenny Lind, performs concerts in the city
- 1848: 100,000 people gather on Glasgow Green to support Chartists
- 1849: Queen Victoria visits the city; Buchanan Street railway station opens
- 1851: Glasgow becomes Scotland's largest city, overtaking Edinburgh, with a population of 329,096 over 18% of which were Irish-born Portland St suspension footbridge is built
- 1851–1854: Victoria Bridge is built at Stockwell Street
- 1857–1859: St Vincent Street Church is built by Alexander "Greek" Thomson
- 1859: Loch Katrine water supply is opened by Queen Victoria
- 1862: Dr Henry Littlejohn becomes the city's first medical officer
- 1865: Dr Edward William Pritchard is the last person to be publicly hanged in the city, for poisoning his wife and mother-in-law
- 1866: The last outbreak of Cholera in the city occurs; the City Improvement Trust clears slums and constructs new roads and buildings
- 1867: Queen's Park F.C. is founded
- 1868-1870: The University of Glasgow buildings at Gilmorehill are built to designs by George Gilbert Scott
- 1872: Rangers F.C. is founded; Glasgow's first tram line is established, running from St. George's Cross to Eglinton Toll
- 1876: Partick Thistle F.C. is founded
- 1877: Mitchell Library opens
- 1883: The Boys' Brigade is founded
- 1887: Celtic F.C. is founded; Glasgow Botanic Gardens management taken over by town council
- 1888: International Exhibition (1888)
- 1891: City of Glasgow Act extends city boundaries and transfers ownership of the Botanic Gardens to the Corporation
- 1895: First cremation in Scotland's first crematorium, at the Western Necropolis
- 1896: Opening of the Glasgow Subway
- 1897: Partick Thistle F.C. establish their home ground at Meadowside

== 1900–1999 ==
- 1901: Glasgow International Exhibition
- 1902: 25 football fans die and 587 injured in the first Ibrox disaster; magistrates attempt to prohibit young women from serving in bars
- 1903: Charles Rennie Mackintosh designs Miss Cranston's Willow Tearooms
- 1904: A fire at North British Railway premises in Hunter Street kills firefighter William Rae
- 1904: The Kings' and Pavilion Theatres open
- 1905: Theatre Royal opens
- 1905–1907: The Caledonian Railway extends the Central Hotel
- 1906–1911: New buildings for the Mitchell Library are constructed
- 1909: Charles Rennie Mackintosh's Glasgow School of Art opens; Partick Thistle F.C. play their first match at their new Firhill Stadium
- 1911: International Exposition (Scottish Exhibition of National History, Art and Industry) at Kelvingrove; Glasgow's population is 785,000
- 1914: Emigration leads to 20,000 housing vacancies in Glasgow
- 1919: Large strike for a 40-hour week: a demonstration turns into a riot known as the Battle of George Square and the Sheriff of Lanarkshire requests military assistance: troops are sent from elsewhere in Scotland and from England while Glasgow soldiers are confined to barracks
- 1921: Sinn Féiners murder a policeman
- 1923: Grouping of virtually all British railway companies: the Caledonian and Glasgow and South Western Railways are merged into the London, Midland and Scottish Railway (LMS); and the North British into the London and North Eastern Railway (LNER)
- 1925: There are approximately 200 miles (320 km) of tramlines and 1100 trams in and around the city
- 1926: Violence during General Strike
- 1929: Hogmanay cinema fire causes stampede which kills 69 children in the Glen Cinema (Glasgow has nearly 100 cinemas)
- 1931: The Glasgow population peaks at 1,088,000 thus becoming Britain's 2nd biggest city; the Dental Hospital in Sauchiehall Street is built
- 1934: Unemployed "Hunger marchers" shunned by Ramsay MacDonald; RMS Queen Mary launched
- 1935: Glasgow's subway becomes electric
- 1936: Overcrowding exists in 29% of Glasgow's houses
- 1937: Citywide automatic telephone dialling becomes available
- 1938: Glasgow hosts the Empire Exhibition, Scotland 1938 at Bellahouston Park
- 1939: World War II: Glasgow naval base HMS Spartiate opens
- 1940: Bombs in Glasgow hits Merkland Street subway station, closing the underground for four months, and heavy cruiser HMS Sussex while undergoing mechanical repairs keeping it out of service for two years
- 1941: Bombing raids on Clydebank: 500 killed
- 1944: Glasgow trams carry about 14 million passengers
- 1946: Glasgow naval base HMS Spartiate closes
- 1949: Trolleybuses in Glasgow introduced, condemned by pedestrians as the "whispering death"
- 1950: Eye infirmary demolished
- 1951: Royal Scottish Academy of Music and Drama (RSAMD) is formed by merger
- 1952-1955: Union Bank of Scotland absorbed by Bank of Scotland
- 1955: Duke Street prison closed
- 1958: William Burrell dies and bequeaths the Burrell Collection to the city; Lanarkshire County Council moves its headquarters from Ingram Street to Hamilton
- 1960: Glasgow electric Blue Train system starts; Dame Jean Roberts is elected Glasgow's first female Lord Provost
- 1962: Last route of the Glasgow Corporation Tramways closes
- 1964: University of Strathclyde established; Beeching closes low-level (Argyle) line
- 1966: Buchanan Street railway station and St Enoch railway station close
- 1967: Celtic F.C. first British winners of European Cup; liner Queen Elizabeth 2 launched on the Clyde; trolley-buses withdrawn
- 1969: Last daily steamers from Bridge Wharf
- 1970: M8 motorway and Kingston Bridge open
- 1971: 66 Rangers F.C. fans die in the second Ibrox disaster; Government refuse to save Upper Clyde Shipbuilders
- 1972: Rangers F.C. win 1972 European Cup Winners' Cup Final
- 1975: British Army tackle rubbish caused by dustmans strike; Glasgow becomes the home of Strathclyde Region's headquarters; the city sees the start of Britain's first mass-circulation daily newspaper workers' cooperative when the Scottish Daily News opens in Albion Street in May, as well as the country's first newspaper work-in when it folds after six months
- 1977: Glasgow Subway closes for extensive modernisation (reopening in 1980)
- 1978: The Rev Geoff Shaw, first Convener of Strathclyde Regional Council (and former leader of Glasgow Corporation), dies in office aged 52
- 1979-1980: Low level Argyle Line re-opens
- 1982: Roy Jenkins wins Hillhead by-election for the newly formed Social Democratic Party
- 1983: Burrell Collection opens; launch of the Glasgow's miles better campaign
- 1985: Scottish Exhibition and Conference Centre opens; Glasgow population is 734,000
- 1988: The Glasgow Garden Festival hosts this year's National Garden Festival and attracts 4.3 million visitors.
- 1989: High number of poll tax arrears; St Enoch Centre opens
- 1990: Named as Cultural City of Europe; McLellan Galleries re-opens; Glasgow Royal Concert Hall completed; liner Queen Elizabeth 2 returns to the river Clyde to mark the 150th anniversary of the beginning of the Cunard Steam Ship Company; the world's first Robot Olympics takes place in the city
- 1991: Glasgow Women's Library opens
- 1993: Glasgow Caledonian University established; opening of the new St Mungo's Museum, the UK's only Museum of Religion, next to the city's 13th century cathedral; barque Glenlee is towed back from Spain to the Clyde where she was built in 1896
- 1996: Glasgow Festival of Visual Arts; opening of the Gallery of Modern Art in the former Stirling's Library; first Glasgow International Festival of Design
- 1996–1999: Festival of Architecture and Design
- 1997: Opening of new £38 million Clyde Auditorium at the Scottish Exhibition and Conference Centre
- 1999: Glasgow is UK City of Architecture and Design; Buchanan Galleries open; millennium celebrations; The Rt Hon Donald Dewar (MP and MSP for Glasgow Anniesland) become the first First Minister of Scotland

== 2000–Present ==
- 2002: Final of UEFA Champions' League held at Hampden Park. Real Madrid beat Bayer Leverkusen 2–1;2002 Glasgow floods: 200 people evacuated from Greenfield and Shettleston, contaminated water supply affects 140,000 residents across the city
- 2003: Celtic F.C. reach the 2003 UEFA Cup Final in Seville
- 2004: Fifteen-year-old Scottish boy Kriss Donald is abducted, tortured and murdered by Scots-Pakistani gang in racially motivated attack; Stockline Plastics factory explosion, Nine people dead, 37 injured, 15 seriously
- 2005: The city launches a bid to host the 2014 Commonwealth Games
- 2006: Kelvingrove Art Gallery and Museum reopens after its three-year, £27.9million restoration
- 2007: Final of UEFA Cup held at Hampden Park on 16 May; Scotland's first terrorist attack after the Lockerbie bombing fails at Glasgow Airport; Glasgow awarded 2014 Commonwealth Games
- 2008: Rangers F.C. reach the 2008 UEFA Cup Final at the City of Manchester Stadium but lose 2–0 to Zenit Saint Petersburg; Harbour Footbridge is completed
- 2010: City of Glasgow College formed by merger of Central College, Glasgow Metropolitan College and Glasgow College of Nautical Studies
- 2011: Glasgow Subway modernisation works begin with refurbishment of Hillhead subway station
- 2012: Rangers F.C. enters administration on 14 February, and the company is later liquidated. A new company takes over and the club are voted into the Scottish Football League Third Division; Glasgow hosts the preliminary football matches of the 2012 Summer Olympics
- 2013: 2013 Glasgow helicopter crash: A police helicopter crashes into the Clutha Vaults pub in central Glasgow, killing 10 and injuring 31
- 2014: The National Commemoration for the Centenary of the First World War take place in Glasgow, including a service in Glasgow Cathedral, attended by the Duke of Rothesay, Prime Minister David Cameron, First Minister Alex Salmond, Lord Provost Sadie Docherty and several leaders of British Commonwealth Countries. Sir Trevor McDonald introduced a number of readings to the 1400 guests. Readings included ones from Kate Adie, Indian High Commissioner Ranjan Mathai and Kirsten Fell, a 16-year-old pupil from Dunbar Grammar School; The Glasgow School of Art library is largely destroyed by a fire; 2014 Commonwealth Games take place in Glasgow; In the Scottish independence referendum Glasgow votes 53.5% in favour of Scotland becoming an independent country but the national vote is 55.3% against; 2014 Glasgow bin lorry crash: A Glasgow City Council bin lorry collides with pedestrians in Queen Street; 6 people are killed and 15 injured
- 2016: In the United Kingdom European Union membership referendum Glasgow votes 66.6% in favour of remaining in the European Union but the UK-wide vote is 51.9% in favour of leaving; Rangers F.C. play their first game back in the top flight of Scottish Football after being demoted to the bottom tier four years previously due to suffering serious financial difficulties; Kelvin Hall reopens after its £35million refurbishment as an art and cultural centre
- 2018: A second fire breaks out at the Glasgow School of Art which also spreads to surrounding buildings including the O2 ABC; Glasgow hosts multiple sporting events including cycling, gymnastics and aquatics as part of the 2018 European Championships
- 2021: COP26, the 26th UN Climate Change Conference of the Parties, is held at Glasgow; Hampden Park hosts four matches, including two involving the Scottish national team, at the delayed UEFA Euro 2020 tournament, in front of reduced crowds due to the COVID-19 pandemic
- 2022: Rangers F.C. reach the 2022 UEFA Europa League Final in Seville

== See also ==
- Glasgow
- Scotland
- History of Glasgow
- History of Scotland
- Timeline of Scottish history
- Timeline of Edinburgh history
