= History of Glasgow =

This article deals with the history of the city of Glasgow, Scotland.

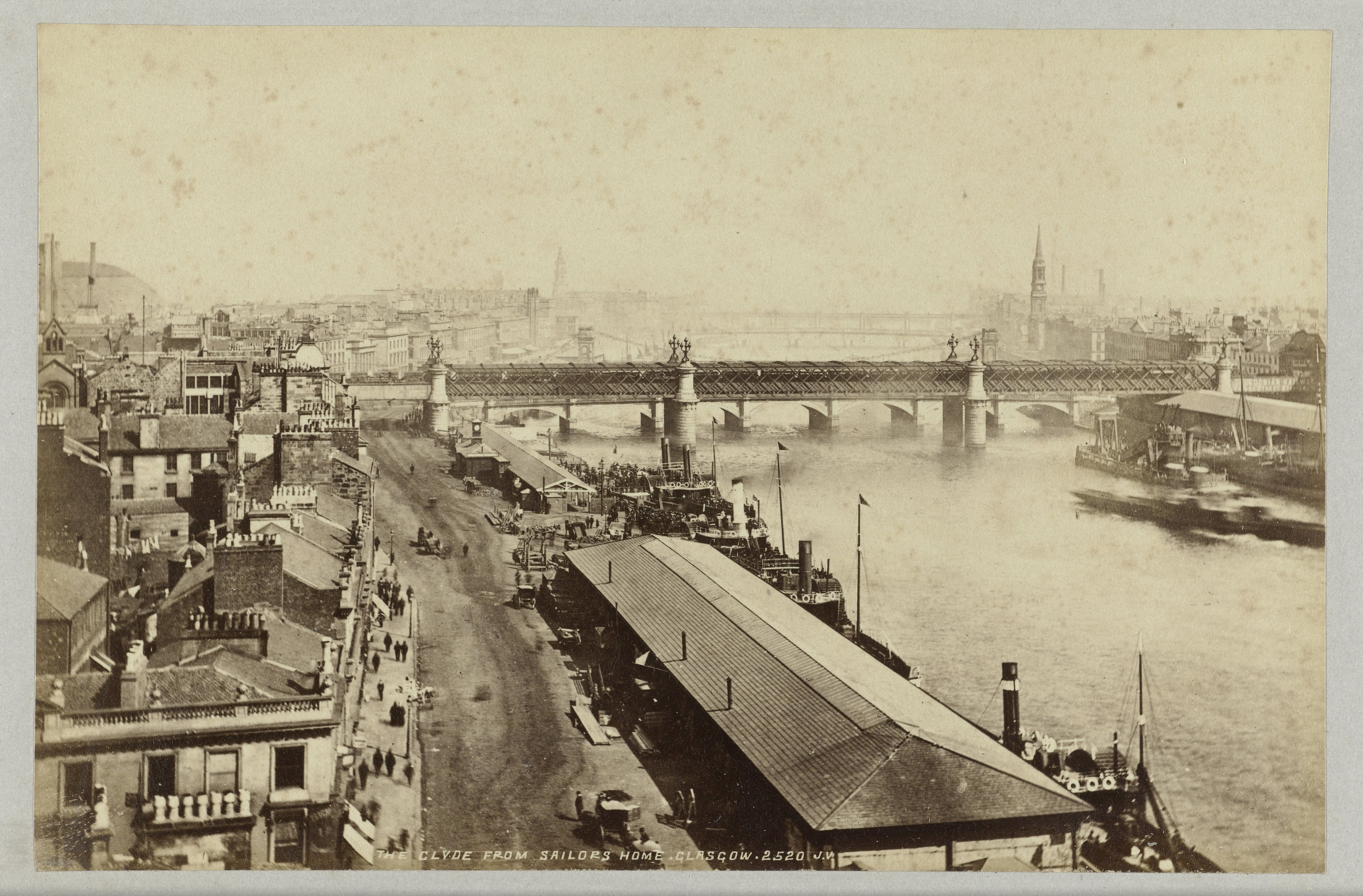
Glasgow docks 1860

== Founding of the city ==
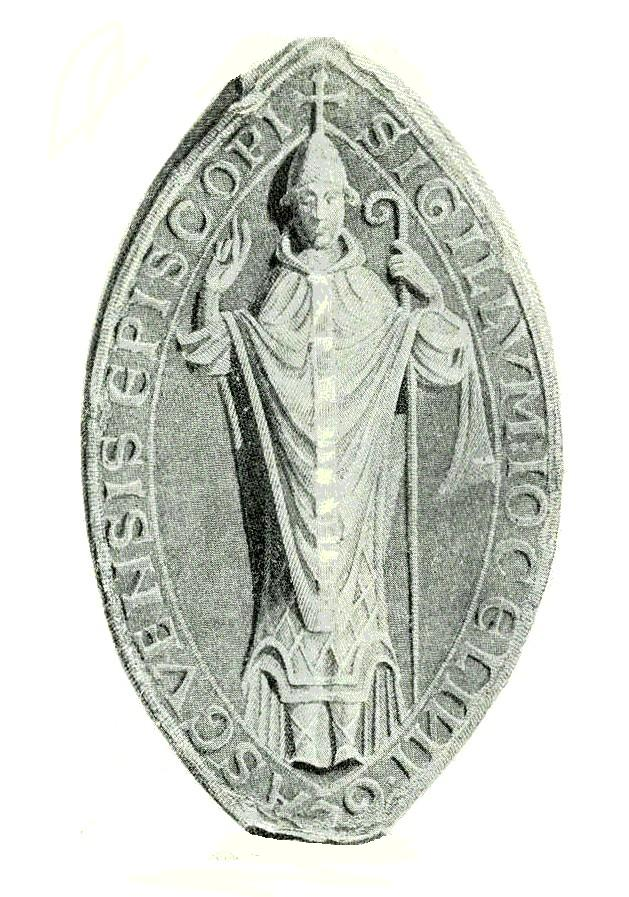
The seal or signet of Jocelin, Bishop of Glasgow, founder of the burgh of Glasgow.

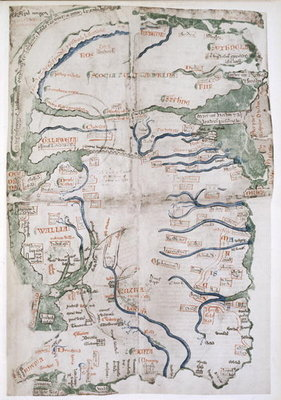
Map by Matthew of Paris featuring Glasgow in the top left quadrant. Held in the British Library. c. 1250

The present site of Glasgow has been settled since prehistoric times, being the furthest downstream fording point of the River Clyde, at its confluence with the Molendinar Burn. The Romans built outposts in the area and constructed the Antonine Wall to keep Roman Britannia separate from Celtic and Pictish Caledonia. Items from the wall, such as altars from Roman forts, including Balmuildy, can be seen in the Hunterian Museum. After the Romans withdrew from Caledonia, the village was part of the large Kingdom of Strathclyde, whose capital was at Dumbarton 15 mi (24 km) downstream. It merged in the 9th century with other regions to create the united Kingdom of Scotland. The origins of Glasgow as an established city derive from its medieval position as Scotland's second largest bishopric. Glasgow increased in importance during the 10th and 11th centuries when this bishopric was reorganised by King David I of Scotland and John, Bishop of Glasgow.

== Glasgow Cathedral ==
By the 12th century Glasgow had been granted the status of what can now be called a city and Glasgow Cathedral was the seat of the Bishops and (after 1472) the Archbishops of Glasgow. While there may have been wooden buildings on the site, the first stone cathedral was consecrated in about 1136 and replaced by a bigger one which was consecrated in 1197. In the 15th century a private chapel was made to St Machan in the north nave to devolve to the congregation at the death of the founder. Extensions and alterations to the cathedral buildings have continued ever since. The most recent addition was the Millennium Window unveiled on 3 June 1999.

After the Scottish Reformation in 1560, the Catholic rituals ended and the Catholic statues and symbols were removed or painted over. The large Cathedral served three different Presbyterian parishes simultaneously. The choir was used by the Inner High parish. The nave was used by the Outer High parish (later named St. Paul's). The crypt was used by Laigh parish.

== University of Glasgow ==
In 1451, the University of Glasgow was founded by papal bull and established in religious buildings in the precincts of Glasgow Cathedral. By the start of the 16th century, Glasgow had become an important religious and academic city and by the 17th century After 1870 the university attained international stature. The university's teaching quality was assessed in 2009 to be among the top 10 in Britain, along with its reputation as a "research powerhouse."

== Trade and the Industrial Revolution ==
=== Atlantic trade ===
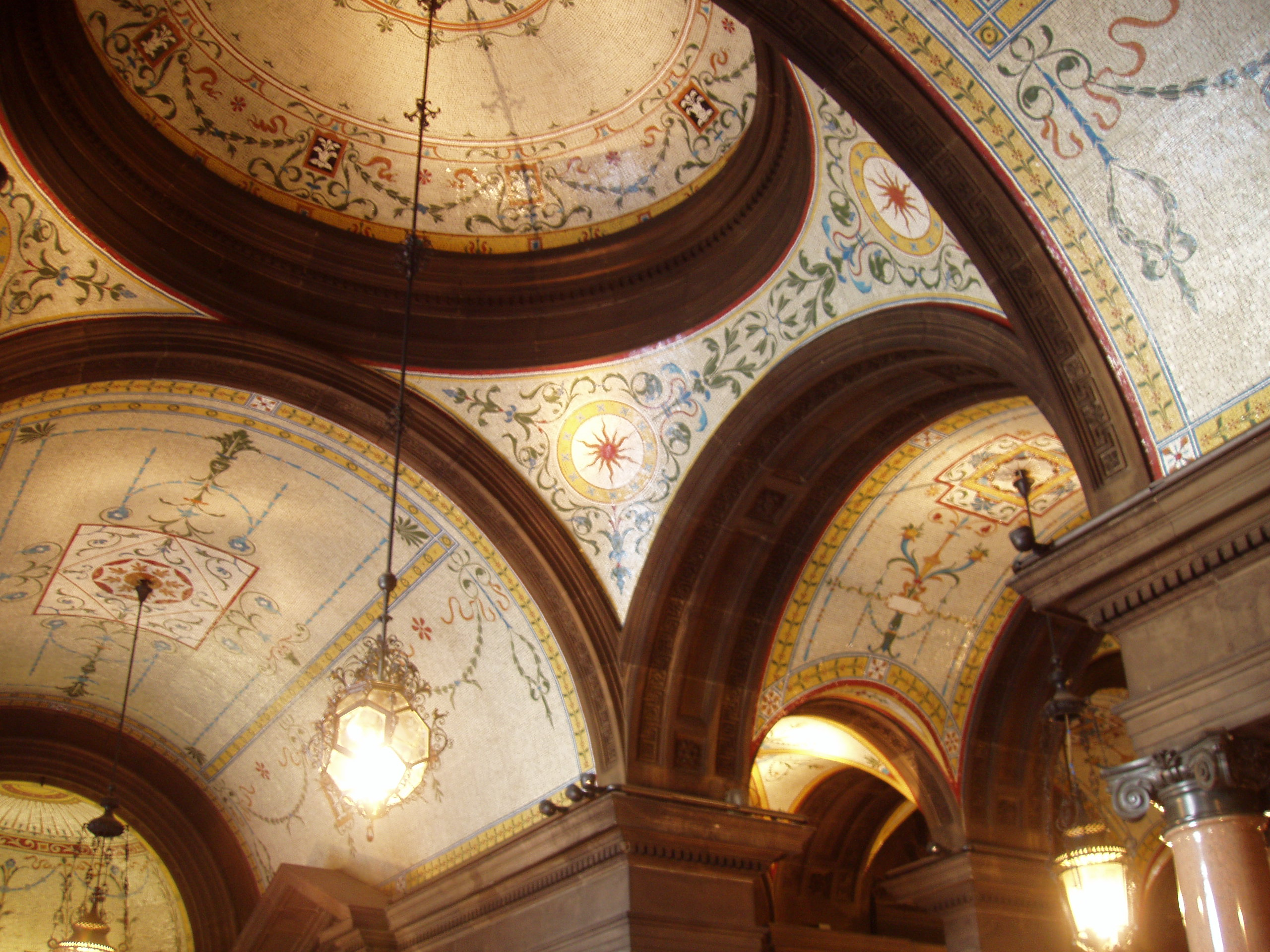
Glasgow's City Chambers, mosaic ceiling of the ground floor Loggia

By the 16th century, the city's tradesmen and craftsmen had begun to wield significant influence, particularly the Incorporation of Tailors, which in 1604 was the largest guild in Glasgow; members of merchant and craft guilds accounted for about 10% of the population by the 17th century. With the discovery of the Americas and the trade routes it opened up, Glasgow was ideally placed to become an important trading centre with the River Clyde providing access to the city and the rest of Scotland for merchant shipping. However, Scottish trade opportunities were hampered when the Parliament of England passed the Navigation Acts in 1651, proscribing non-English shipping from trading with the English overseas possessions and transporting goods from non-European nations to England or its colonies. Scotland's loss of the colony of Nova Scotia as a result of the Anglo-French War of 1627–1629 also hampered Scottish trade. A second attempt at a Scottish colony, the Darien scheme, ended in disaster, bankrupting the country in 1700. However, Scottish merchants were undeterred by the Navigation Acts, continuing small-scale smuggling with English colonies until the Act of Union in 1707.

Access to the Atlantic Ocean allowed the import of slave-produced cash crops such as American tobacco and cotton along with Caribbean sugar into Glasgow, which were then further exported throughout Europe. These imports flourished after 1707, when union with England made the trade legal. By 1760, Glasgow had outstripped London as the main port for tobacco in the Kingdom of Great Britain. The American War of Independence put an end to most American trade, leading to financial ruin for some; trade turned to sugar, which largely came from slave plantations in the Caribbean.

Glasgow's transformation from a provincial town to an international business hub was based originally on its control of the tobacco trade with the Thirteen Colonies. The trade was interrupted by the American Revolutionary War, and never recovered to even a fourth of its old trade. The tobacco merchants grew rich as their stocks of tobacco soared in value; they had diversified their holdings and were not badly hurt. Merchants turned their attention to the British West Indies and to textile manufacture. The trade, along with direct involvement in slave ownership, made a group of Glasgow merchants known as the "Tobacco Lords" very wealthy; they adopted the lifestyle of the landed gentry, and lavished vast sums on great houses and splendid churches of Glasgow. The merchants constructed spectacular buildings and monuments that can still be seen today, and reinvested their money in industrial development to help Glasgow grow further.

=== Civic improvements ===
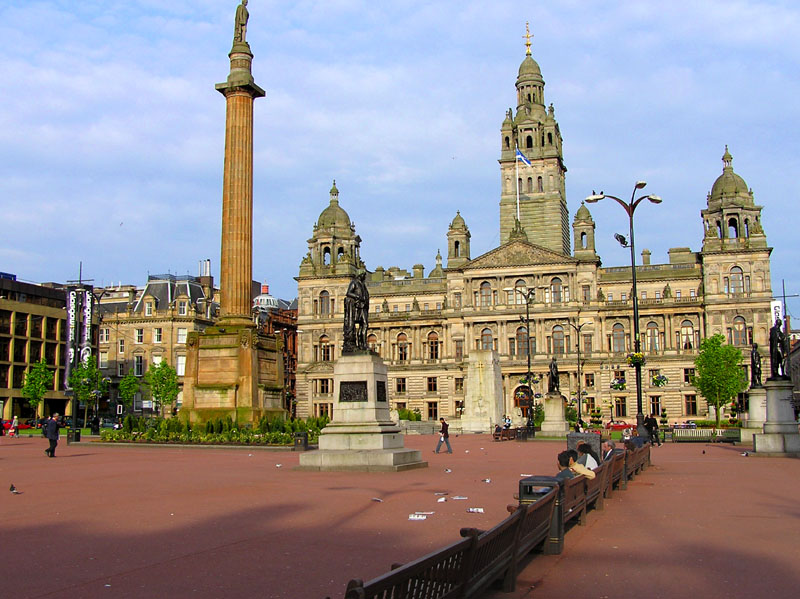
George Square and Glasgow's City Chambers

As the city's wealth increased, its centre expanded westwards as the lush Victorian architecture of what is now known as the Merchant City area began to spring up. New public buildings such as the City Chambers on George Square, Trades hall on Glassford Street, and the Mitchell Library in Charing Cross epitomised the wealth and riches of Glasgow in the late 19th century with their lavishly decorated interiors and intricately carved stonework. As this new development took place, the focus of Glasgow city centre moved away from its medieval origins at High Street, Trongate, Saltmarket and Rottenrow, and these areas fell into partial dereliction, something which is in places still evident to the present day.

Largely due to the money generated by trade, but also thanks to the opportunities created by the different industries present in and around the city, Glasgow's population boomed. Where in 1750 it had numbered 32,000 inhabitants, by 1850 it counted 200,000. Town planning began in earnest in about 1770, under the guidance of James Barrie who, in 1772, implemented a new grid system above Ingram Street. However, this could not keep pace with the increasing population and conditions in the overcrowded slums were notoriously bad.

The de-silting of the Clyde in the 1770s allowed bigger ships to move further up the river, thus laying the foundations for industry and shipbuilding in Glasgow during the 19th century.

The abundance of coal and iron in Lanarkshire led to Glasgow becoming an industrial city. Textile mills, based on cotton and wool, became large employers in Glasgow and the local region.

=== Shipbuilding ===
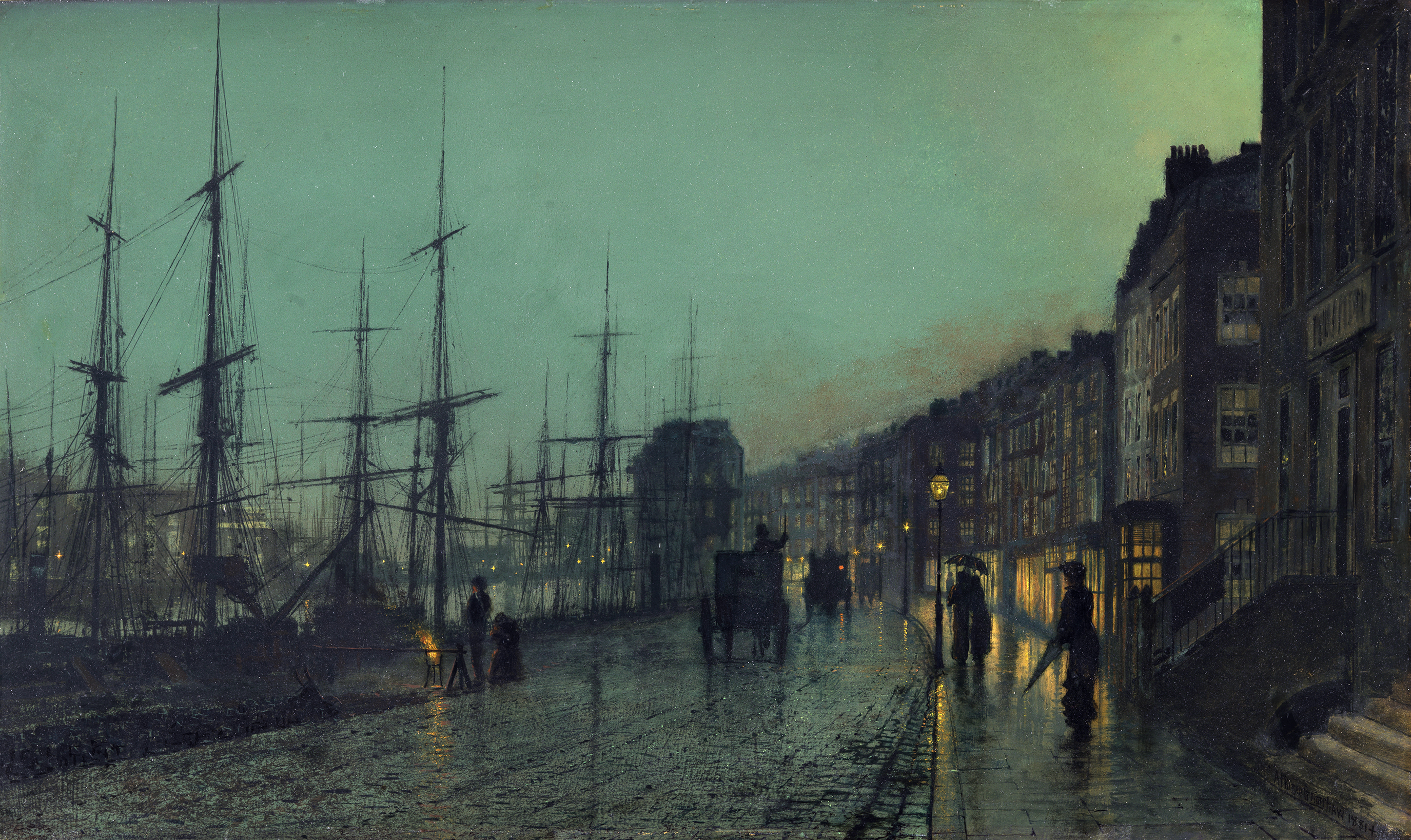
Shipping on the Clyde, by John Atkinson Grimshaw, 1881.

In 1893 the burgh was constituted as the County of the City of Glasgow. Glasgow became one of the richest cities in the world, and a municipal public transport system, parks, museums and libraries were all opened during this period.

Glasgow became one of the largest cities in the world, and known as "the Second City of the Empire" after London [although Liverpool, Dublin and several other British cities claim the same]. Shipbuilding on Clydeside (the river Clyde through Glasgow and other points) began when the first small yards were opened in 1712 at the Scott family's shipyard at Greenock. After 1860 the Clydeside shipyards specialised in steamships made of iron (after 1870, made of steel), which rapidly replaced the wooden sailing ships of both the merchant fleets and the battle fleets of the world. It became the world's pre-eminent shipbuilding centre. Clydebuilt became an industry benchmark of quality, and the river's shipyards were given contracts for warships.

=== Textile industry ===
In the late 17th century, Scottish linen was a major export to England. In 1680, the linen industry employed about 12,000 people in the Glasgow area, and the industry was heavily promoted by the government. Thanks to a series of government acts and beneficial tax measures, by 1770, Glasgow had become the largest linen manufacturer in Britain. Tastes, however, were shifting towards ever more diaphanous fabrics, and Scottish manufacture could not compete in terms of quality. The climate was ideal for processing cotton, and Glasgow textile manufacturers turned their attentions to the production of fine cotton muslins, at which they came to excel, challenging the dominion of Indian muslins traded by the East India Company by the 1780s. Textiles, including plain, chequered and printed linens, and clothing items were among Scotland's main exports to the tobacco-producing colonies from the 1720s onwards; while the majority of these exports initially consisted in linen, by the close of the 18th century cotton had taken its place.

From the 1750s, the fashion for silk gauze led to an industry being set up in Paisley, which was hugely successful. Silk gauze was worn by women of almost all social classes, and could not be washed without losing its lustre, so the market was immensely lucrative. By the 1780s, Paisley silk gauze was being exported to England, Ireland and Continental Europe. As the fashion changed, cotton and muslin took over.

== 20th century ==
The First World War brought large war contracts to the shipbuilders, even as many of the most skilled workers went into the services.

The city council was unique in the United Kingdom in appointing an official war artist, Frederick Farrell.

The war saw the emergence of a radical movement called "Red Clydeside", led by militant trades unionists. There were also many strikes by the radical Shop Stewards' Movement, whose Clydesdale leader Willie Gallacher later won a seat at West Fife in the 1935 general election to become the only Communist Party of Great Britain MP to sit in the House of Commons. Formerly a Liberal Party stronghold, the industrial districts switched to the Labour Party by 1922, with a base among the Irish Catholic working class districts. Women were especially active, with solidarity on housing issues. However, the "Reds" operated within Labour and had little influence in the British Parliament. The mood therefore changed to passive despair by the late 1920s.

== Decline of industry and the post-war period ==
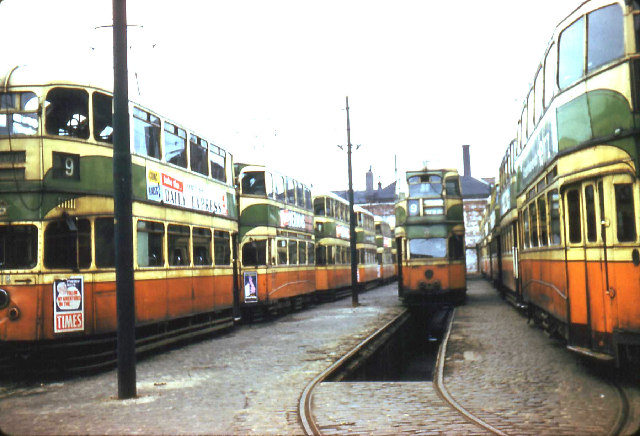
Shortly before the end of tram services in Glasgow in September 1962 this line up of trams waiting to be scrapped could be seen at the depot.

Glasgow did not escape the effects of the Great Depression.

=== Second World War ===
The outbreak of the Second World War in 1939 temporarily arrested the ongoing decline, with the city's shipyards and heavy industries working at capacity to fuel the war effort, but this too came at a price – the Luftwaffe bombing of Clydeside (the worst of which was the Clydebank Blitz in March 1941 (although the target of the bombing, the shipbuilding town of Clydebank, is just outside Glasgow itself).

=== Deindustrialization ===
Although ships and trains were still being built on Clydeside, cheap labour abroad reduced the competitiveness of Glasgow's industries. New shipbuilding superpowers such as Japan began to emerge as the competitiveness of the Glasgow shipyards began to decline. The major shipbuilders on the Clyde began to close down, but not before Clydebank had built one of its last great ships, Cunard's Queen Elizabeth 2. As of today, three major shipyards remain on the River Clyde, two of which are owned by BAE Systems Naval Ships; Govan and Scotstoun, which focus principally upon the design and construction of technologically advanced warships for the Royal Navy and other navies. Glasgow's function as a port also diminished – the introduction of containerized freight spelled the end for the riverside's docks and wharves which had crumbled into dereliction by the late '60s.

=== Regeneration ===
As WW2 came to a close, the chief engineer of Glasgow Corporation – Robert Bruce – published the first of two highly influential studies into how the city could be regenerated in the future without the dominant heavy industries which had brought it much wealth in the past. The Bruce Report, as it would become known, would ultimately become the blueprint of the Glasgow of today. Its basic aim was to depopulate the overcrowded centre, dispersing the population to outer areas of the city to allow a new service based economy to flourish with the help of an overhauled transport system. Although many of its more radical proposals to rebuild the city centre were rejected – Bruce advocated the destruction of many now-cherished Victorian and Edwardian buildings, the report's housing and transport proposals were virtually followed to the letter. The infamous tenement slums (many of which had been destroyed or badly damaged by wartime bombs) were replaced by a new generation of high rise housing and large suburban housing estates (known locally as "schemes").

In 1949 the Scottish Office in Edinburgh issued an alternative to the Bruce Report, the Clyde Valley Regional Plan 1946 ('CVP'). This was authored by a team led by Sir Patrick Abercrombie and Robert H Matthew and disagreed with the Bruce Report in a number of important areas. In particular the CVP recommended an overspill policy for Glasgow and the rehousing of much of the population in new towns outside the city. The Bruce Report preferred rebuilding and rehousing within the city boundary. In the wake of the Bruce plans, new "planned suburbs" were created on greenbelt sites on the city's periphery, which would rehome thousands displaced from the mass demolition of inner-city slums. The friction and debate between the supporters and spheres of influence for these two reports led to a series of initiatives designed to transform the city over the following fifty years.

In the end a blend of both plans was progressed. Whilst the hundreds of new tower blocks changed the city's skyline forever, the high rise edifices broke up long established community relationships and social structures. Coupled to poor design and low quality construction, many of the new high rise estates created as many problems as they solved and became magnets for crime and deprivation. Thousands more Glaswegians relocated to the new towns of Cumbernauld, East Kilbride, Livingston, Glenrothes and Irvine. Bruce also proposed a ring road scheme around the central area, the which would become part of the M8 motorway, which decimated the Charing Cross and Anderston areas beyond recognition, with many historic Victorian buildings being destroyed to make way for its construction.

In 1964, the city gained its second university when the University of Strathclyde was created out of the former Royal College of Science and Technology, a higher education college focused on vocational education whose history could be traced back to the Andersonian Institute of 1796. The new institution rapidly expanded in the 1970s and has since grown to become Scotland's third-largest university

=== Gloom and revival ===
The 1970s and early 1980s were dark periods in the history of the city, as steelworks, coal mines, engine factories and other heavy industries went out of business. This led to mass unemployment and high levels of urban decay. In the late 1960s a moral panic swept Glasgow with media and police attention focused on new youth gangs that were younger, more violent and more dangerous than the Glasgow razor gangs of the 1920s and 1930s. By the end of the 1970s, with many of the planned suburbs and new housing estates constructed just a decade or two earlier already sliding into decline, the city was beginning to rethink its social housing strategy with an acknowledgement that the policy of 'comprehensive development' pursued in the wake of the Bruce Report had been too draconian and destructive. The GEAR initiative (Glasgow Eastern Area Renewal) in 1977 began a wholesale programme of refurbishment to both the inter-war and historic tenement housing stock in favour of demolition, a trend which soon spread to other areas of the city. Initiatives to stimulate local enterprise with new industrial parks and incentives for start-up businesses were put into place by the Scottish Development Agency.

Since the mid-80s, the city has enjoyed an economic and cultural renaissance – a financial district consisting of a number of new, purpose-built office buildings has rapidly developed in the western end of the city centre, and this has become home to many well-known banks, consultancy and IT firms, legal practices, and insurance companies. Between 1998 and 2001, the city's burgeoning financial service sector grew at a rate of 30%.

In the suburbs, numerous leisure and retail developments have been built on the former sites of factories and heavy industries. Glasgow is the premier site for call-centres in Britain. Critics argue that such new developments are relatively fragile and do not offer as many highly skilled long-term employment opportunities, owing to their dependence on the service sector rather than manufacturing.

=== Major corporations ===
While manufacturing has dwindled in its relative importance to the city's economy, there is still a strong manufacturing sector (the fourth largest in the UK, accounting for well over 60% of Scotland's manufactured exports) particularly in the areas of engineering and shipbuilding, chemicals, food and drink, printing, publishing and textiles, as well as new growth sectors such as software and biotechnology. Glasgow also forms the western part of Silicon Glen which produces over 30% of Europe's PCs, 80% of its workstations, and 65% of its ATMs. A growing number of Blue Chip companies are basing major operations or headquarters in Glasgow, including BT, Abbey, National Australia Group Europe, Royal Bank of Scotland, HBOS, Scottish Power, JPMorgan Chase, Morgan Stanley, Barclays and Lloyds TSB. Glasgow-based Scottish Power is one of three Scottish companies to be included on the Fortune Global 500 rankings. These names rub shoulders with the more well established firms, which represent traditional sectors of Glasgow's economy, including; Diageo, Allied Domecq, William Grant & Sons, Tennent Caledonian Breweries, Whyte and Mackay, MacFarlane Group, BAE Systems, Rolls-Royce Aero Engines, Imperial Chemical Industries, Weir Group, and Aggreko.

== Modern Glasgow ==
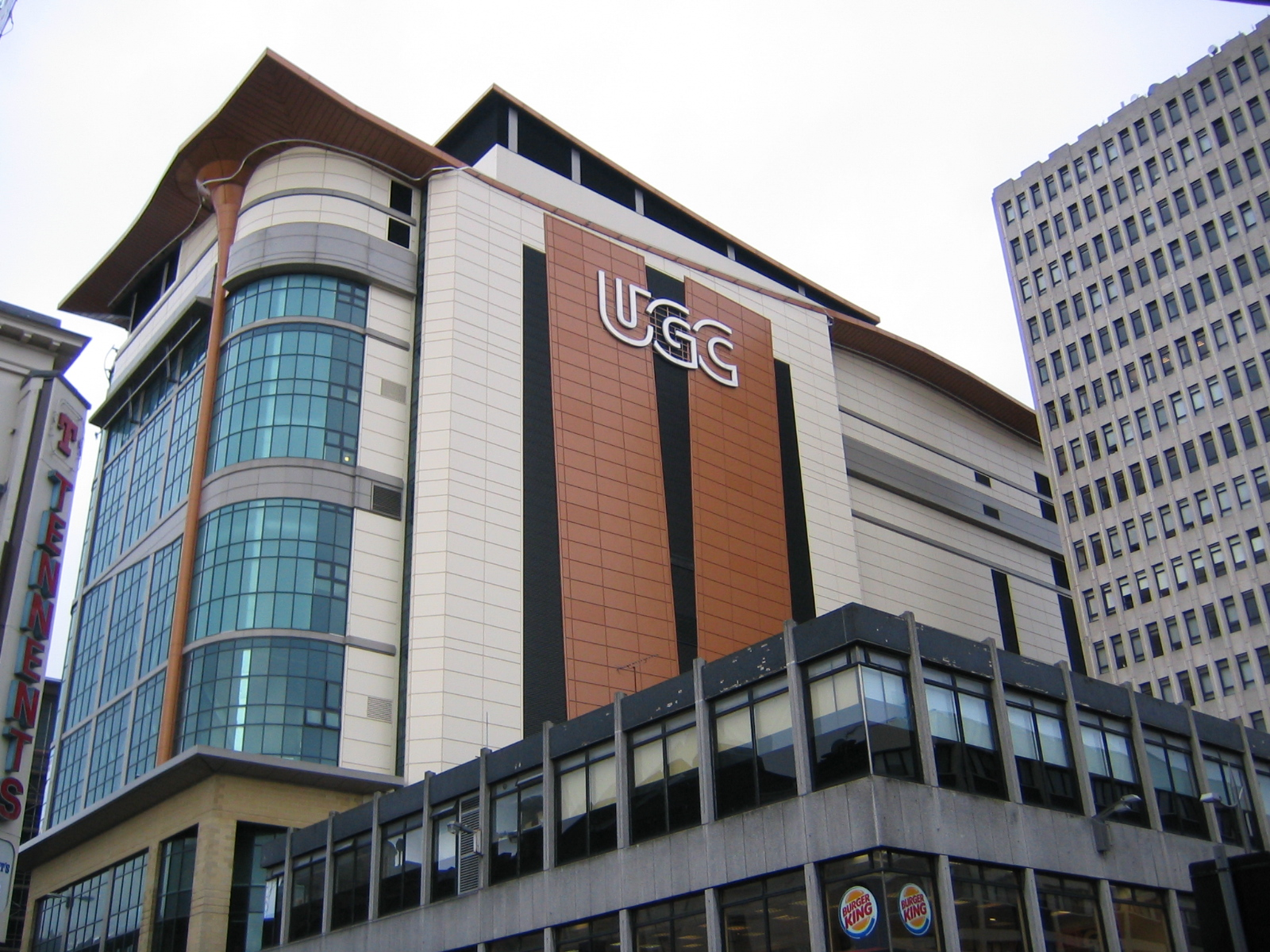
Cineworld on Renfrew Street – The World's Tallest Cinema

Since the 1980s, Glasgow has been rebuilding both its image and its architecture. The City Council began a programme of sandblasting the decades of soot and grime from the city's many tenements and municipal buildings, revealing their magnificent Victorian stonework. Rather than demolish the tenement flats that had survived, they were instead extensively cleaned and refurbished to become desirable private housing. The western end of the central area was redeveloped into a new central business district which continues to attract financial firms from around the globe. In 1983, the 'Glasgow's Miles Better' campaign was followed by the considerable coup of the National Garden Festival being held in Glasgow in 1988 at the Prince's Dock in Govan. Glasgow was then named European City of Culture in 1990, followed by City of Architecture and Design in 1999 and European Capital of Sport in 2003. Glasgow boasts the largest contemporary arts scene in the UK outside London, which is centred on the annual 'Glasgow International' arts festival. Glasgow was the host city for the 2014 Commonwealth Games, and football events for the 2012 Olympic Games were staged in the city.

The city's riverbank has been particularly transformed – from industrial dereliction caused by the decline of shipbuilding into an entertainment and residential centrepiece. The banks of the Clyde have become a playground for property developers, with office blocks and high-rise luxury flats taking the place of the old shipyards, granaries, wharves and docks.

Glasgow is the capital of contemporary music in Scotland, and has many venues and clubs such as the Barrowlands and King Tut's Wah Wah Hut that promote new bands and DJs. Additionally, it is home to artists such as Franz Ferdinand and Belle & Sebastian. The SSE Hydro opened in 2013, is the 3rd most busiest music venue in the world.

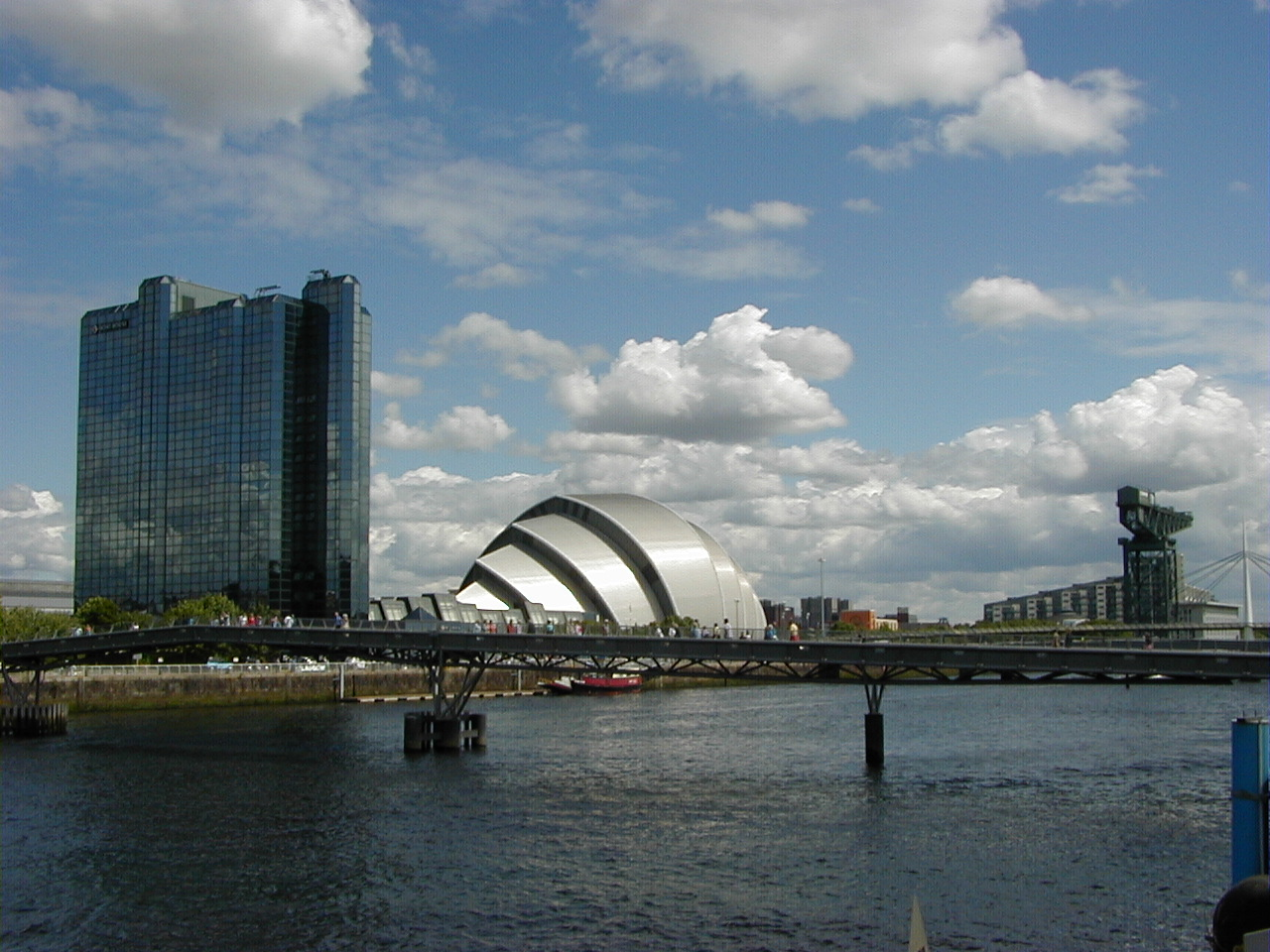
Recent years have seen a regeneration of Glasgow's river banks. Salmon have now returned to the Clyde

Redevelopment of residential areas, combined with the increased cultural activities, has contributed to a better environment. With this, the City Council has been successful in attracting tourists, conferences as well as major sporting events to the city. Public housing, previously administered by the Glasgow City Council, was transferred to the not-for-profit Glasgow Housing Association in 2003. This affected some 80,000 properties and created Britain's largest social landlord in an innovative tenant-led organisation. The new GHA has already begun the process of demolishing many of the concrete housing estates and high-rise tower blocks which were built during the 1960s, in preparation for a new generation of public housing.

Prior to the 2013 merger of Scottish police forces into Police Scotland, Glasgow's local police force was Strathclyde Police. Its area covered Glasgow, Renfrewshire, Ayrshire, Lanarkshire, Dunbartonshire and Argyll & Bute. Established in 1975, the force served 2.2 million people and replaced the local county constabularies and the City of Glasgow Police, the UK's first police force.

== Archaeology ==
In March 2019, 'Stones and Bones' community archaeologists, with a boy named Mark McGettigan, revealed long-lost medieval stone carvings at Govan Old Parish Church. The stones dating to the 10th and 11th centuries known as the Govan Stones were assumed to have been demolished by chance when a neighboring shipyard building was destroyed in the 1970s. "This the most exciting discovery we have had at Govan in the last 20 years. The Govan Stones are a collection of international importance and these recovered stones reinforce the case for regarding Govan as a major early medieval centre of power" said Professor Stephen Driscoll.

== See also ==
- Economic history of Scotland
- History of Partick
- Housing in Glasgow
- Politics of Glasgow
- Timeline of Glasgow history
