= Timeline of Edinburgh history =

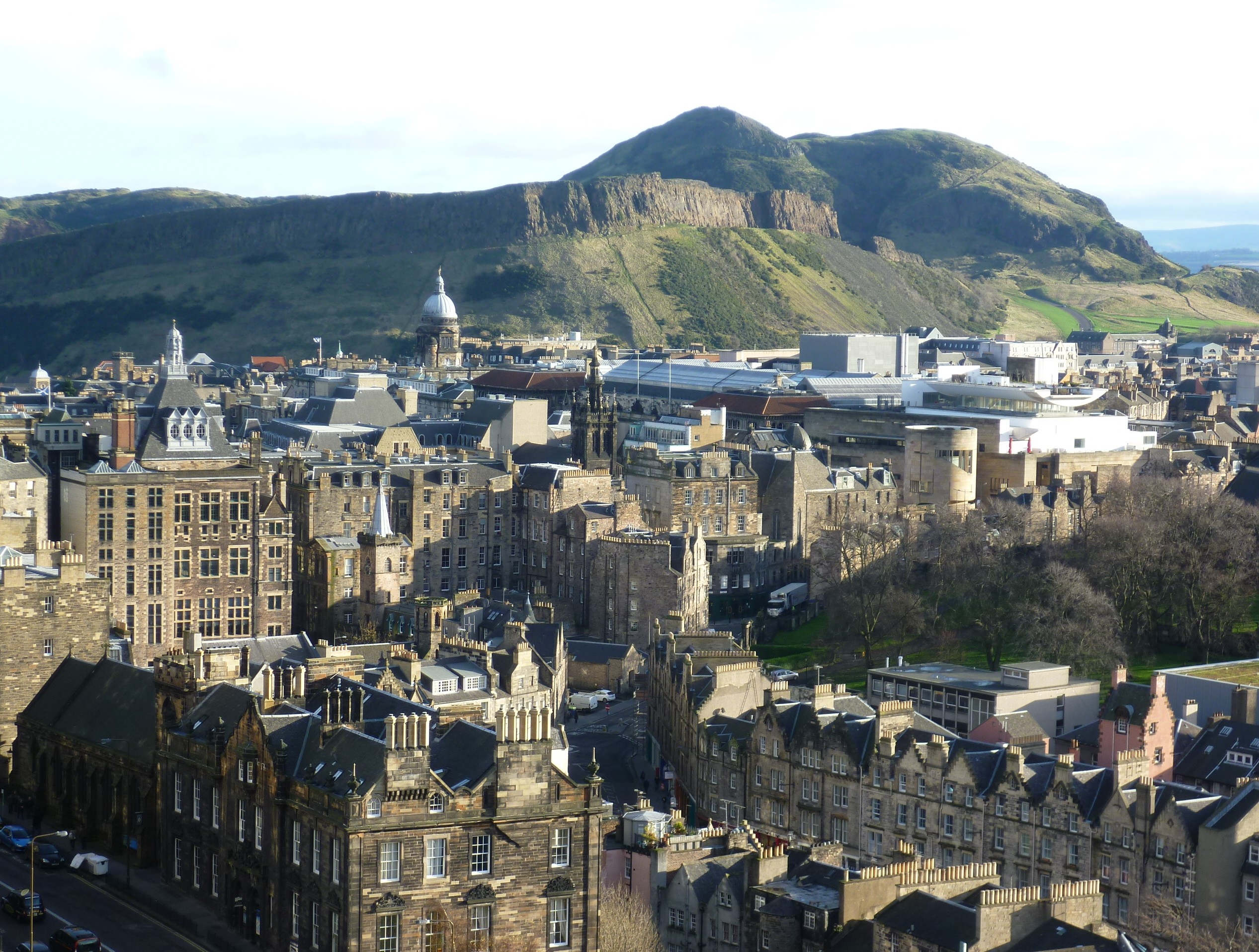
View of Arthur's Seat from Edinburgh Castle

This article is a timeline of the history of Edinburgh, Scotland, up to the present day. It traces its rise from an early hill fort and later royal residence to the bustling city and capital of Scotland that it is today.

== 1st millennium ==
Pre-1st century AD: Late Bronze Age (c.600 BC) weapons were found in Duddingston Loch in 1778. Traces of four Iron Age forts have been identified at Arthur's Seat, Dunsapie Crag, Salisbury Crags and Samson's Ribs.

2nd century AD: Roman forts were built and manned at Cramond and Inveresk on the western and eastern margins of the present-day city.

c.600: The traditional date of the military campaign, starting out from Edinburgh ("Din Eydin"), commemorated in the Old Welsh poem Y Gododdin by the poet Aneirin. At this time the inhabitants of the region spoke predominantly Old Welsh (the ancestor of modern Welsh). The name of the king or chief whom the poem names as the leader of the Gododdin was Mynyddawc Mwynvawr.

c.638: Edinburgh is besieged by unknown forces, according to a chronicle kept at Iona in the Hebrides. Many scholars have supposed that this siege marks the passing of control of the fort of Din Eydin from the Gododdin to the Northumbrian Angles, led by Oswald of Northumbria

731: Edinburgh is the most northerly outpost of the Anglian kingdom of Northumbria at the time of Bede, who completed his History in this year

840s–50s: Cinaed mac Ailpin (Kenneth MacAlpin) raids Northumbrian Lothian, burning Dunbar and possibly Edinburgh, from his kingdom of the Scots north of the Firth of Forth

854: The 12thC chronicler Symeon of Durham mentions a church at Edwinesburch in 854 AD

934: Æthelstan attacks Lothian – according to the Annals of Clonmacnoise, "Adalstan king of the Saxons preyed & spoyled the kingdom of Scotland to Edenburrogh, & yet the Scottishmen compelled him to return without any great victory"

c.960: Edinburgh comes under Scottish rule during the reign of Indulf (954–62)

== 11th century ==
c.1018: Malcolm II secures Lothian for his kingdom after the Battle of Carham

1074: Refortification of the castle begins under Malcolm III who uses it increasingly as a royal residence

1093: Queen Margaret dies in the castle and is taken to Dunfermline for burial

== 12th century ==
1124 to 1127: Royal Charter by David I granting a toft in "burgo meo de Edenesburg" to the Priory of Dunfermline, perhaps implying Royal burgh status for Edinburgh

1128: King David I founds Holyrood Abbey

c.1130: Probable date of St Margaret's Chapel erected inside Edinburgh Castle, now recognised as Edinburgh's oldest building

c.1143: David I grants the Augustinian canons of Holyrood leave "to establish a burgh between that church and my burgh", thus founding the burgh of Canongate

1162: Edinburgh is the caput of the Lothian sheriffdom

== 13th century ==
1230: Alexander II founds large Dominican friary (Blackfriars); a hospital is also open

1243: Edinburgh's parish church dedicated to St Giles

1274: Lothian is an archdeaconry of St. Andrews

1296: Edward I captures and garrisons Edinburgh Castle after a three-day-long siege employing catapults

== 14th century ==
1314: Edinburgh Castle captured by Thomas Randolph, 1st Earl of Moray; the castle is slighted on the orders of Robert the Bruce to deny English occupiers a stronghold in the future

1326–1331: Edinburgh's contribution to Scottish burgh taxes is 15%, half that of Aberdeen

1328: The Treaty of Edinburgh is signed guaranteeing Scottish independence

1329: Robert I's charter confirms the town royal burgh status with powers over the port of Leith and its mills

1330: Wall between High Street and Cowgate is first mentioned

1334: Scotland loses Berwick and Edinburgh Castle to the English (the loss of her main port increases the importance of Edinburgh and Leith)

1335: The castle is refortified by Edward III of England

1341: Scots regain castle from English

1349: An outbreak of the Black Death occurs

1356: Burnt Candlemas: Edward III burns the town but then retreats from lack of provisions

1357: David II returns after 11 years of captivity in England

1360: The castle is the usual royal residence, being strengthened in stone

1363: First reference to Grassmarket as "the street called Newbygging under the castle"

1364: David II grants ground for building of new tron (weigh beam)

1365: Jean Froissart visits Edinburgh. In his Chronicles he calls Edinburgh the "capital of Scotland" and the "Paris of Scotland"

1367: David II begins work on major fortifications at castle

1371: David II dies unexpectedly at the castle

1384: Duke of Lancaster extorts ransom following end of truce

1385: Richard II of England burns the town

1386: Robert II grants ground for building of a tolbooth

1387: Five new chapels are added to the Church of St Giles following English damage in 1385

1398: Edinburgh buys the east bank of the Water of Leith at South Leith from Sir Robert Logan with the right to erect wharves and quays and to make roads through the lands of Restalrig (the later Easter Road) for the transport of goods and merchandise to and from the town

1400: Henry IV attempts to storm castle when Robert III refuses homage.

== 15th century ==
1403: The earliest burgh record mentions the "Pretorio burgi" – the Old Tolbooth

1414: Edinburgh is granted further lands at Leith by Sir Robert Logan

1427: King's Wall first recorded

1437: The murder of James I at Perth leads to Edinburgh becoming the main royal residence and site of Parliaments, hence seen increasingly as the capital of Scotland

1438: The Old Tolbooth is used by the Estates of Parliament for the first time

1440: The Earl of Douglas and his brother are murdered at the castle by Chancellor Crichton

1440s: Edinburgh has 47% of Scottish wool trade

1450: James II grants charter permitting the building of a defensive town wall

1451: First record of Incorporation of Skinners

1455–1458: Greyfriars (Franciscan) friary is founded

1457: The 20in (508mm) siege gun "Mons Meg" is received at the castle; Deacon of goldsmiths begins assaying and marking of works

1458: Edinburgh has one of three supreme courts in the country

1460: Trinity College Kirk and Hospital founded by Mary of Guelders

1467–1469: St Giles' gains collegiate status, a provost and 14 prebendaries are established

1474: Furriers and Tailors crafts become incorporations

1475: Websters, Wrights and Masons crafts incorporated

1477: Charter of James III ratifying and confirming the location of markets within the burgh; The Hammermen (smiths) are incorporated

1479: A hospital is set up in Leith Wynd; Cordiners second Seal of Cause (a charter of privileges) granted

1482: James III awards the Crafts of Edinburgh the flag known as the 'Blue Blanket'

1485: Oppressive rules against dealings with inhabitants of Leith; stone tenements appear in the town

1488: Seal of Cause granted to the Incorporation of Fleshers

1490: The Franciscan friary closes

1492: Goldsmiths, originally part of Incorporation of Hammermen, form their own incorporation; Baxters incorporated

1497: Outbreak of the "grandgore" (syphilis); infected persons are quarantined at the King's command on the island of Inchkeith in the Firth of Forth

1500: Edinburgh pays 60% of Scotland's customs revenue; Waulkers craft granted Seal of Cause; c.1500 Candlemakers receive Seal of Cause

== 16th century ==
1501-5: James IV builds Holyrood Palace

1503: James IV marries Margaret Tudor

1505: Barber surgeons form incorporation – later becomes Royal College of Surgeons

1507: James IV grants a patent for the first printing press in Scotland to Walter Chepman and Androw Myllar

1508: James IV charter allows first feuing of the burgh muir

1510: Edinburgh purchases Newhaven from the Crown

1512: Launching of the "Great Michael" at Newhaven

1513: Defeat at Flodden leads to a new southern wall being begun

1520: "Cleanse the Causeway" (30 April); pitched battle on the High Street between the Douglas and Hamilton clans leads to the Earl of Angus (Douglas) seizing control of the town; Edinburgh is the "seat of courts of justice"

1523: The town has 14 craft guilds

1528: James V enters the town with an army, to assert his right to rule; Holyrood Palace is extended

c.1528–c.1542: printing in Edinburgh re-established under royal licence granted to Thomas Davidson

1530: There are 288 brewers, mostly "alewives", in the town, one for every 40 people; Bonnetmakers craft receives Seal of Cause

1532: The Court of Session is established

1534: Norman Gourlay and David Stratton are burnt as heretics

1535–1556: Edinburgh contributes over 40% of Scotland's burgh taxation

1537: Janet Douglas, Lady Glamis is burnt at the stake

c.1540: Magdalen Chapel built in the Cowgate

1544: Earl of Hertford burns the town, including Holyrood Palace and Abbey

1547: Scottish army defeated by an English army at the battle of Pinkie six miles east of Edinburgh; the routed Scots are pursued as far as Holyrood outside the town walls

1550: John Napier of Merchiston, discoverer of logarithms, born

1558: Reformers destroy Blackfriars Monastery and Church; the Flodden Wall is completed; Edinburgh's population is about 12,000; there are 367 merchants, and 400 craftsmen

1559: Town council appoints John Knox minister at St. Giles

1560: English and French troops at the Siege of Leith withdraw under Treaty of Edinburgh; Scottish Reformation Parliament abolishes papal authority in Scotland

1561: Town council quells apprentice riot against banning (by 1555 Act of Parliament) of traditional May Day "Robin Hood" pageant; Mary, Queen of Scots returns to Scotland

1562: St. Giles' churchyard having reached capacity, Queen Mary grants town the use of the grounds of the Greyfriars as a new burial ground; Convenery of the Trades of Edinburgh established

1565: Mary, Queen of Scots, marries Henry Stuart, Lord Darnley; the beheading machine known as "The Maiden" is introduced for executions

1566: David Rizzio is stabbed to death and Queen Mary is held captive in Holyrood Palace by Scottish nobles. She escapes to Dunbar Castle and returns to Edinburgh with an army 9 days after Rizzio's murder.

1567: Darnley is assassinated at the Kirk o' Field; the prime suspect James Hepburn is cleared of the murder; Edinburgh acquires South Leith

1569: The town is hit by an outbreak of the plague

1571: Netherbow Port rebuilt

1573: The Marian civil war is concluded when "the Queen's Men" are ousted from the castle by the Regent Morton

1574: The castle's Half-Moon Battery is built; there are seven mills in Edinburgh

1579: James VI makes his State Entry to Edinburgh

1580s: There are some 400 merchants in Edinburgh

1581: James Douglas, 4th Earl of Morton is executed for complicity in the murder of Lord Darnley

1582: The University of Edinburgh is founded and given a royal charter – it is Scotland's fourth university

1583: Edinburgh, previously a single parish, divided into four parishes, each with its own minister; There are an estimated 500 merchants and 500 craftsmen in the town, of which 250 are tailors

1585: Plague comes to Edinburgh, the sick are quarantined at the Burgh Muir.

1588: 736 merchants and 717 craftsmen enlisted for defence of the town against the Spanish Armada threat

1590: First paper mill in Scotland opens at Mungo Russell's Dalry Mills (near Roseburn).

1590: Entry and coronation of Anne of Denmark.

c.1590: Riddle's Court, off the Lawnmarket, built by Bailie John MacMorran, reputedly Edinburgh's richest merchant

1591: Francis Stewart, 5th Earl of Bothwell escapes from imprisonment in Edinburgh castle.

1592: The kirk session of St. Giles conducts the first Edinburgh census: there are 2,239 households with 8,003 adults (over 12 years of age), split evenly between north and south of the High Street; 45 per cent of the employed (4,360) are domestic servants in households of the legal and merchant professions and town houses of the landed class

1593: Francis Stewart, 5th Earl of Bothwell, raids Holyrood Palace.

1594: Earl of Bothwell fails to seize the town

1595: Bailie John McMorran shot dead during an occupation by scholars of the Grammar School in High School Yards

1596: Clergy demand arms to defend King and Church against "papists"; Society of Brewers formed

1599: The Convention of Estates meeting in Edinburgh ordains that the new year should begin on 1 January instead of 25 March

1600: Roads out of Edinburgh number twelve; the town council orders a gun salute, church bells rung and bonfires lit in thanks for King James's escape from the Gowrie conspiracy; royal printers active in the period included Robert Waldegrave and Robert Charteris

== 17th century ==
1602–c.1620: Construction of Greyfriars Kirk

1603: King James VI of Scotland succeeds to the English throne and leaves Edinburgh; golf clubs manufactured for the King by William Mayne

1604: Execution by hanging of a chief of the MacGregors and eleven of his clansmen for the Colquhoun massacre

1606: Netherbow Port rebuilt, replacing ruinous 1571 Port

1607: Town council employs Englishman John Orley and four "expert musicianes" playing shawms and hautbois as a town band

1608: Town council orders bonfires lit on 5 November in remembrance of the treasonable Gunpowder Plot

1610–1621: Printer Andro Hart active

1611: Town council appoints three postmasters with responsibility for the hiring of post horses.

1613: John Maxwell, 9th Lord Maxwell hanged for the murder of the Laird of Johnstone

1614: Napier's book of logarithms published

1615: Execution of Patrick Stewart, 2nd Earl of Orkney after rebellion to overthrow the king

1617: James VI visits Edinburgh for the only time after the Union of the Crowns; 1550s building extended to form 5-storey and attic tenement in Lawnmarket later known as Gladstone's Land

1618: Some tenement buildings reach seven storeys; population c. 25,000, of which approx. 475 are merchants

1619: The privy council orders the town to clean up its streets; a hospital of 1479 converted into a workhouse

1620: Construction of Tailor's Hall in the Cowgate

1621: Edinburgh and Leith pays 44% of Scottish non-wine customs duty, and 66% of wine duty

1622: "Lady Gray's House", later "Lady Stair's House" (now the Writers' Museum), built; fleshers required to move slaughterhouses to banks of the North Loch

1624: Plague epidemic; George Heriot dies after bequeathing a hospital for the maintenance and education of the "puir, faitherless bairns" of deceased Edinburgh burgesses

1628–1659: Construction of Heriot's Hospital

c.1628–1636: Telfer Wall, named after its builder, is built to enclose Greyfriars Kirk and Heriot's Hospital within the town's defences

1632: Construction begins on the new Parliament House for the Parliament of Scotland

1633: Edinburgh designated a bishopric; Scottish coronation of Charles I at Holyrood Abbey offends Presbyterian sentiments

1635: First public Post established between Edinburgh and London by royal authority

1636: Edinburgh buys Regality of Canongate together with North Leith, parts of South Leith, and Pleasance; construction of the Tron Kirk begun; population of the town c.30,000

1637: Riots in protest at the introduction of a new Prayer Book; supplication to remove bishops from the privy council

1638: National Covenant signed in Greyfriars Kirkyard

1639: Decisions of Glasgow Church of Scotland assembly ratified

1640: Completion of Parliament House

1641: Birth of Sir Robert Sibbald, Geographer Royal

1642 or 1645: Mary King's Close abandoned

1645-46: Outbreak of plague in Edinburgh and Leith

1647: James Gordon of Rothiemay's map of Edinburgh; completion of the Tron Kirk

1649: Scottish Estates proclaim succession of Charles II on 5 February; execution of George Gordon, 2nd Marquess of Huntly by Covenanters; the suburbs of West Port and Potterrow purchased by the town council and erected into the barony of Portsburgh

1650: Execution of James Graham, 1st Marquess of Montrose, by hanging; surrender of Edinburgh Castle to invading forces of Oliver Cromwell; early fire engine in Edinburgh; much of the Palace of Holyrood destroyed by fire;

1652: Introduction of a stagecoach to London with a journey time of a fortnight

1653: General Assembly broken up by English forces

1655: Council of state established; ministers yielded to the English

1657: The Guild of Apothecaries and Surgeons is established by the town council

1659: Camel seen for the first time in the city ("Ane great beast calit ane drummondary, cleven futted like unto a kow.")

1660: Government of Scotland resumed by the Committee of Estates; the Mercurius Caledonius, arguably the first Scottish newspaper, written and edited by Thomas Sydserf, published on 31 December

1661: Execution of Archibald Campbell, 1st Marquess of Argyll

1663: Execution of Archibald Johnston of Warriston, co-author of the National Covenant of 1638; Edinburgh buys the burgh of regality of Leith Citadel

1671: John Law, founder of the Banque Générale, born

1673: City's first coffeehouse opens at the head of Parliament Close; 20 licensed hackney coaches are available for hire

1674: German engineer, Peter Brauss or Brusche, creates a piped water supply, drawn gravitationally from Comiston Springs, three and a half miles from the city, to a cistern on Castle Hill; after a major fire in the High Street the town council orders all ruinous and burned tenements henceforth to be rebuilt in stone

1675: Physic garden planted at Holyrood founded by Robert Sibbald

1678: First regular stagecoach to Glasgow

1679: Some 1200 Covenanters are imprisoned at Greyfriars after the battle of Bothwell Bridge; some are executed in the Grassmarket; town council organises a Town Guard (or City Guard) for prevention of crime and disorder (disbanded 1817)

1681: Royal College of Physicians founded by Robert Sibbald under patronage of the Duke of Albany and York (later King James VII and II); Merchant Company of Edinburgh receives Royal Charter; Viscount Stair's Institutions of the Laws of Scotland published

1682: Advocates Library, forerunner of the National Library of Scotland, founded by Sir George Mackenzie with the Duke of Albany as patron; Mons Meg bursts during salute to the Duke of Albany and York on his entry to the town

1687: Goldsmiths granted Royal Charter

1688: Collapse of royal government in Scotland after Lord Chancellor James Drummond, 4th Earl of Perth flees; mob riot wrecks James VII's royal chapel in Holyrood Abbey

1689: The Convention of Estates accepts the rule of William of Orange by right of conquest; Leven's Regiment (later K.O.S.B.) raised for defence of the city against Jacobites; John Chiesley of Dalry hanged for the murder of the Lord Advocate, Sir George Lockhart

1690s: Legal profession calculated to be more wealthy than merchant class; over 20% of the population employed in manufacture

1691: New Canongate Kirk completed; tax records reveal the city has 18 schoolmasters, 7 schoolmistresses, 40 booksellers, printers and stationers, and 65 wigmakers

1694: Professional classes outnumber merchants; 200 legals (advocates to lawyers), 24 surgeons, and 33 physicians; other occupations included aleseller, executioner, royal trumpeter, and keeper of the signet; ratio of sexes, 70 males:100 females; domestic servants number over 5000

1695: Bank of Scotland established by Act of Parliament; the Company of Scotland devises the Darien scheme

1697: Execution of Thomas Aikenhead for blasphemy

1698: Five ships set sail from Leith on 14 July to found a Scottish colony on the Isthmus of Darien

1700: Fire destroys Edinburgh's, some say Europe's, highest buildings behind St. Giles; Darien scheme fails when colony is abandoned

== 18th century ==
1702: Advocates Library moved to the Laigh Hall in Parliament House

1706: Framework knitters from Haddington are working in Edinburgh

1707: Act of Union passed by the Parliament of Scotland

1711: David Hume, philosopher, is born

1713: The main radial roads into Edinburgh are turnpiked

1715: Jacobites occupy Leith Citadel, but make no attempt to enter Edinburgh

1718: Edinburgh Evening Courant newspaper is launched; damasks are woven at Drumsheugh

1720s: Daniel Defoe praises the High Street, decries Old Tolbooth, notes sales of woollens, linens, drapery and mercery

1722: Signet Library is founded

1725: Barony of Calton (including Calton Hill) purchased by the city

1726: The poet Allan Ramsay establishes Britain's first circulating library; Edinburgh Medical School founded at the town's college; James Hutton, geologist, is born

1727: Royal Bank of Scotland established

1729: The city's first infirmary is opened

1733: Alexander Monro Secundus, discoverer of lymphatic and nervous systems, is born

1735: Golf is played on Bruntsfield Links; also the traditional date for the founding of the Royal Burgess Golfing Society

1736: The Royal Infirmary is given a Royal charter; Porteous Riots shake the city

1737: The Lord provost is debarred from office following the riots

1738: Edinburgh is described as the "world's leading medical centre"; George Watson's College is founded

1739: The Scots Magazine is first published in the city

1740: There are four printing firms in Edinburgh; the biographer James Boswell is born

1741: Royal Infirmary designed by William Adam opens in, what became, Infirmary Street

1744: The first premises at Fountainbridge are built, with more than five looms; first known rules of golf drawn up in Edinburgh for the Gentlemen Golfers of Edinburgh for a competition at Leith Links

1745: Charles Edward Stuart enters the city and proclaims his father James VIII and III; in the "Canter of Coltbrigg", dragoons flee Jacobites

1746: The British Linen Company is formed

1747: A theatre is established at Playhouse Close in the Canongate

1748: Moral philosopher and political economist Adam Smith delivers his first series of public lectures at the University of Edinburgh

1749: A stagecoach service opens between Edinburgh and Glasgow

1750: Birth of the poet Robert Fergusson

1751: A survey shows a severe state of dilapidation in the Old Town

1752: Convention of Royal Burghs publishes proposals for new public buildings, the draining of the Nor Loch and the city's expansion, which are accepted and implemented by the town council

1753: Stagecoach services are introduced to London (taking two weeks)

1754: Building of the Royal Exchange (later Edinburgh City Chambers) in the High Street begins; the Select Society is founded; Mons Meg removed from the castle to the Tower of London

1755: Dr. Webster's census puts the population of Edinburgh, Canongate, St Cuthbert's and Leith at 57,220

1757–1770: Linen weaving works in Canongate

1758: Stagecoach services are introduced to Newcastle (taking one week)

1760: Thomas Braidwood establishes first school in Britain for deaf children; the main linen stamping office is in the city

1760s: Woollen cloth is beetled in a lapping house in Edinburgh

1761: The Bruntsfield Links Golfing Society is formed

1763: Draining of the eastern end of the Nor Loch and construction of the North Bridge, designed by William Mylne, begins; St Cecilia's Hall, by Robert Mylne, Scotland's first purpose-built concert hall, erected; a four-horse coach runs to Glasgow three times a week

1764: Netherbow Port demolished to facilitate traffic flow

1765: The Glasgow coach now runs daily

1766: The competition to design the New Town is won by James Craig

1767: Construction of the New Town begins with the first residence being built in Thistle Court.

1768-71: First edition of Encyclopædia Britannica produced in Anchor Close

1769: Opening of the first Theatre Royal at the north end of the North Bridge; 5 people killed by the collapse of the bridge's southern abutment; Society of Bowlers founded and draws up rules of the game

1770s: There are 27 competing printing firms in the city

1771: Sir Walter Scott is born in College Wynd

1772: Reconstruction of the North Bridge completed; building of Dundas House, on St Andrew Square, designed by Sir William Chambers begins

1773: Dr Johnson visits Edinburgh; Penny Post begun by Peter Williamson

1774: Construction of Robert Adam's Register House at east end of Princes Street begins

Mid 1770s: The British Linen Company completely switches to banking

1775: Population of Edinburgh, Canongate, St Cuthbert's and Leith is 70,430; new St Cuthbert's Church opens; a directory of brothels and prostitutes is published

1777: A new High School building opens in High School Yards; 8 legal and 400 illegal distilleries in the city

1778: Younger's Brewery established within the precincts of Holyrood Abbey

1780: National Museum of Antiquities established as part of Society of Antiquaries of Scotland (later housed in the Royal Institution on The Mound in 1827 and in Queen Street in 1891)

1782: System of parliamentary representation is criticised by Thomas McGrugar in "Letters of Zeno"

1783: Royal Society of Edinburgh created by Royal Charter for "the advancement of learning and useful knowledge"; Society of Antiquaries of Scotland incorporated by Royal Charter for "the study of the antiquities and history of Scotland..."; proposal for the construction of "The Earthen Mound" begins

1784: James Tytler makes the first hot-air balloon ascent in Britain from Comely Gardens to Restalrig village; meeting discusses corrupt electoral system

1785: Italian balloonist Vincent Lunardi makes his first Scottish hydrogen balloon flight from the grounds of Heriot's School, landing 46 miles away in Ceres, Fife; Old Tolbooth becomes usual place of execution

1785–1786: Stone bridge at Stockbridge

1785–1788: The South Bridge is built

1786: The Ayrshire poet Robert Burns is fêted by the city's social elite

1787: New Assembly Rooms opened in George Street

1788: William Brodie is executed – leader of a gang of robbers

1789: The first stone of Edinburgh University's Old College is laid

1791: A census puts the population of the city at 82,706 with 29,718 in the City of Edinburgh (22,512 in the Old Town and 7,206 in the New Town), 6,200 in Canongate Parish, 32,947 in St Cuthbert's Parish, 11,432 in South Leith Parish and 2,409 in North Leith Parish; Robert Burns visits the city for the second and last time

1792: The Friends of the People Society meets for the first time; Charlotte Square designed by Robert Adam; James Craig's Old Observatory completed on Calton Hill

1793: Sedition trials held: Thomas Muir of Huntershill and other radical reformers are sentenced to transportation

1794: Robert Watt, a former spy, is sentenced to death for "Pike Plot"

1797: Snuff manufacturer James Gillespie dies after bequeathing a hospital for the aged poor and a "free school for the education of poor boys"

1799: City has access to 3 million litres of drinking water a day

1800: Stein's Canongate brewery is built

== 19th century ==
1802: Demolition of the Luckenbooths (apart from east-most) in the High Street begins; architects William Sibbald and Robert Reid produce a final plan for the building of a 'Second New Town' north of James Craig's New Town; the Edinburgh Review is published

1802–1806: Bank of Scotland head office is built

1803: William and Dorothy Wordsworth stay in the White Hart Inn in the Grassmarket

1805: Edinburgh Police Act 1805 (45 Geo. 3. c. xxi) establishes police commissioners with responsibility for policing the city (and also cleansing and lighting)

1807-15: Nelson Monument erected on Calton Hill

1810: Construction of Signet Library building by Robert Reid begins (interior by William Stark, 1812–13)

1811–1812: Tron riot, 68 youths were arrested

1813: Royal Edinburgh Hospital, originally called the Edinburgh Lunatic Asylum, opens in Morningside

1814: Waverley, the first of the Waverley Novels, written by Sir Walter Scott, is published; a protest meeting against West Indian slavery is held; two coaches a day run to Stirling

1815: Scottish Widows Fund and Life Assurance Society established

1816–1819: Regent Bridge is built

1817: First copy of The Scotsman newspaper is published in January; Blackwood's Magazine first published; the Old Tolbooth and the remaining Luckenbooth in the High Street are demolished; new County Buildings are erected on the west side of Parliament Square

1818: The Union Canal is begun; new Calton Hill observatory is founded by the Edinburgh Astronomical Institution; the Scottish regalia are found in Edinburgh Castle; Cambridge geologist and antiquarian Edward Daniel Clarke likens Edinburgh topographically to Athens, a view echoed in 1820 by landscape painter Hugh William Williams who coins the terms "Modern Athens" and "Athens of the North"; gas lighting makes its first appearance

1819: Five coaches a day run between Edinburgh and Glasgow, taking 12 hours for the journey of 42 miles (68 km)

1820: Remaining western end of the Nor Loch drained; Charlotte Square completed; there are protests at George IV's treatment of Queen Caroline; the Royal Botanic Garden begins its move from Leith Walk to Inverleith; the Radical Road built along base of Salisbury Crags

1821: The official government census gives the population of Edinburgh and Leith as 138,235 with Leith as approx. 26,000; Melville Monument in honour of Henry Dundas, 1st Viscount Melville erected in St. Andrew Square

1822: George IV visits Edinburgh and wears the kilt; the first Highland and Agricultural Show takes place; the Union Canal opens; Princes Street's 79 oil lamps are replaced by 53 gas lamps

1822–29: Building of National Monument dedicated to Napoleonic war dead and designed in style of the Parthenon begun on Calton Hill (but abandoned through lack of public subscriptions)

1823: The Bannatyne Club is founded; the Edinburgh Academy is built at a cost of £12,000

1824: The Great Fire of Edinburgh destroys the buildings between the Tron Kirk (which loses its spire) and Parliament Close just months after James Braidwood organises Britain's first municipal fire brigade; James Hogg's novel Confessions of a Justified Sinner, set in Edinburgh, is published

1825: Standard Life Assurance Company established; eight Royal Mail coaches and over fifty stage coaches leave Edinburgh each day; the foundation stone of the new Royal High School, costing £17,000, is laid

1826: The Royal Institution opens, designed by William Henry Playfair; the Scottish Academy (later the Royal Scottish Academy) is founded; John Bartholomew founds the mapmaking firm John Bartholomew & Son Ltd.

1827: Walter Scott reveals himself to be the author of the Waverley novels at a Theatrical Fund dinner in the George Street Assembly Rooms

1828: Burke and Hare are arrested for the "West Port Murders". Burke is put on trial and convicted on Hare's evidence

1829: Building of George IV Bridge and Dean Bridge begins; the murderer William Burke is hanged; the new Royal High School opens; Walter Scott arranges the return of Mons Meg to Edinburgh Castle

1830: Advocates Library by William Henry Playfair constructed; The Mound is macadamised and more or less complete

1831: Major outbreak of cholera; the official government census puts Edinburgh's population at 162,403; James Clerk Maxwell born in India Street; opening of the Edinburgh and Dalkeith Railway (known as The Innocent Railway), the first to come into the city. It uses horse-drawn carriages

1832: Surgeons' Hall by William Henry Playfair, the headquarters of the Royal College of Surgeons of Edinburgh, completed; outbreak of cholera in the city (recurs 1848 and 1866); The Scotsman newspaper incorporates the Caledonian Mercury

1833: The city goes bankrupt; partly due to the development of Leith docks

1835: No further expansion of the New Town takes place after the incomplete building of Hopetoun Crescent off Leith Walk

1836: The Royal Institution extended

1840: Bernard's Edinburgh Brewery in North Back of Canongate (Calton Road) opens

1841: The population according to the government census is 133,692. The figure for Leith is 26,026

1841–1851: Donaldson's Hospital (school for the Deaf) is built

1842: Edinburgh-Glasgow railway line is open to the public; Queen Victoria includes the city in her first visit to Scotland

1843: Disruption of the Church of Scotland; Queen's Drive laid through the Queen's Park (completed 1847; extended to Duddingston, 1856); Warriston Cemetery opened

1844: Tolbooth Church (now The Hub) completed to house the General Assembly of the Church of Scotland; Political Martyrs' Monument erected on Calton Hill; North British Railway Company established

1844–1846: The Scott Monument is built

1846: New College by Playfair built for the Free Church of Scotland; publication of pioneering inquiry 'Day And Night in the Wynds of Edinburgh' by Dr. George Bell draws public attention to poverty, overcrowding and slum conditions in the Old Town; North British Railway opens the North Bridge terminus of its Berwick-Edinburgh line

1847: Half of Edinburgh's population attend the funeral of Thomas Chalmers; Dr. Simpson announces his discovery of the anaesthetic properties of chloroform; the Edinburgh and Glasgow Railway line is extended from its Haymarket terminus to a new Edinburgh General station adjoining the new Canal Street station and North British terminus (the three termini becoming known collectively as Edinburgh Waverley, c.1854); Alexander Graham Bell is born in South Charlotte Street

1848: Trinity College Kirk dismantled to make way for the expansion of North Bridge station; Edinburgh Burns Supper Club first established

1849: New reservoir building erected on Castlehill

1850: Robert Louis Stevenson born in Howard Place; the foundation stone of the Scottish National Gallery is laid; Younger's Holyrood Brewery is enlarged for the third time

1851: According to the census, Edinburgh and Leith's population is 191,303; the British Linen Bank head office opens on St. Andrew Square

1852: Duke of Wellington statue erected in front of Register House

1853: The Edinburgh Trades Council is established; a camera obscura is installed in Short's Observatory on Castle Hill (renamed the Outlook Tower in 1896)

1854: Several passers-by killed when part of the old town wall collapses on the west side of Leith Wynd; town council orders removal of a 150-foot long stretch of remaining wall south of the collapsed section.

1856: Edinburgh Municipal Extension Act incorporates the Canongate, Calton and Portsburgh in the city; North British Rubber Company rubber mill (in former silk mill) and McEwan's Fountain Brewery open in Fountainbridge

1857: Fire destroys the western half of James' Court, off the Lawnmarket; St. Margaret's Loch formed in the Queen's Park

1859: The National Gallery opens; Cockburn Street laid to give access to Waverley Station from the High Street; Melville Drive laid through the Meadows; Arthur Conan Doyle born in Picardy Place: last performance at the Theatre Royal in Shakespeare Square, the site is compulsorily purchased for the erection of a General Post Office; first St. Cuthbert's Co-operative Society shop opens on corner of Fountainbridge and Ponton Street

1860: Bank of Scotland has 43 branches

1860-68: First edition of Chambers Encyclopaedia published by Robert and William Chambers

1861: Building of Industrial Museum (called the Museum of Science and Art by the time it opened and later the Royal Scottish Museum) begins beside the Old College of the University; construction of the General Post Office on Waterloo Place (on the site of the Theatre Royal) begins; first firing of the Time Gun ("one o'clock gun") from the castle; 35 are killed in a tenement collapse between Bailie Fyfe's Close and Paisley Close in the High Street

1864: Last public hanging in the Lawnmarket; the Bank of Scotland head office re-designed and extended over the next 6 years

1865: Dr. Littlejohn's report on the city's sanitation paints a picture of degradation and high death rates; Queen's Theatre and Opera House, built in 1855 in Broughton Street, changes name to Theatre Royal

1867: The Edinburgh City Improvement Act, conceived in the wake of Littlejohn's report, receives the Royal assent and initiates the rebuilding of the Old Town; Scottish Women's Suffrage Society holds meetings for first time

1868: Craigleith Hospital and Poorhouse opens, later develops into the Western General Hospital

1869: Lorimer & Clark's brewery opens on Slateford Road, Gorgie; Sophia Jex-Blake becomes first female medical student

1870: First Princes Street railway station opens (replaced 1893); Fettes College opens; Chambers Street is laid

1870–1879: Building of the new Royal Infirmary, the biggest hospital in Europe under one roof

1871: First street tramway (between the Bridges and Haymarket); Greyfriars Bobby Fountain is erected outside Greyfriars Kirk; first rugby international (Scotland v. England) played on the Edinburgh Academy ground at Raeburn Place

1872: Ross Fountain erected in Princes Street Gardens; construction of Watt Institution and School of Arts begins in Chambers Street

1872–1883: Restoration of St. Giles'

1874: Heart of Midlothian F.C. formed

1875: Hibernian F.C. formed; Institute of Bankers founded; Cockburn Association (Edinburgh Civic Trust) founded

1877: Hall of new Trinity Church in Chalmers Close completed incorporating apse from Trinity College Kirk

1879: St Mary's Episcopal Cathedral in Palmerston Place consecrated; R. L. Stevenson's Picturesque Notes, describing the city and its society, is published; William Ewart Gladstone addresses 20,000 people in Waverley Market at start of Midlothian campaign; the Royal Infirmary of Edinburgh moves to Lauriston Place

1881: Queen Victoria hosts a parade of 39,473 Scottish Volunteers in a heavy downpour of rain at Holyrood, giving rise to the occasion being remembered as the "Wet Review"; Dean Distillery opens, converted from Dean Mills

1882: Chair of Celtic established at Edinburgh University; City brought to standstill by severe winter weather

1883: Royal Lyceum Theatre built

1884: Blackford Hill acquired by the city for use as a public park

1885: Watt Institution and School of Arts becomes Heriot-Watt College; reconstructed Mercat Cross handed over to the city by benefactor William Ewart Gladstone; Caledonian Distillery opens at Haymarket, at one time the largest distillery in Europe

1886: The Edinburgh International Exhibition of Industry, Science and Art takes place in the Meadows; 'Cooke's Circus', a combined circus and variety theatre, opens in East Fountainbridge

1887: The Edinburgh School of Medicine for Women founded by Sophia Jex-Blake; production starts at North British Distillery in Gorgie area

1888: Slight earthquake felt in the city at 5am on 2 February; Flying Scotsman train reaches Edinburgh from London in 6 hours 19 minutes during the Race to the North

1889: Opening of the Braid Hills to the public following acquisition by the city

1890: Central Library on George IV Bridge, partly paid for by Andrew Carnegie, opens to public

1891: Scottish National Portrait Gallery and National Museum of Antiquities of Scotland opens on Queen Street; the census gives Edinburgh's population as 269,407 (including 8,182 Portobello residents)

1892: Jenners department store in Princes Street burns down (rebuilt store opens 1895); Drybrough's brewery moves to Craigmillar

1893: Caledonian Railway's Princes Street Station completed

1894: McVitie & Price Ltd bakery rebuilt in Gorgie; the new Parish Church of St Cuthbert, by Hippolyte Blanc, is dedicated

1895: Royal National Observatory built on Blackford Hill; first electric street lighting installed

1896: First female doctors graduate from the University of Edinburgh; Portobello is incorporated into Edinburgh

1897: Opening of the rebuilt North Bridge at a cost of £90,000; cable car track laid in Princes Street

1900: Construction of new Midlothian County Buildings begins, replacing old County Hall of 1817; Stockbridge gains a library and hall; character actor Alastair Sim is born; Robert Younger's St Ann's Brewery, Abbeyhill begins brewing

== 20th century ==
1901: University appoints its first Professor of Scottish history; the Royal High School has 350 pupils; first use of the name 'Royal Mile' to describe the main thoroughfare of the Old Town

1902: New Waverley Station completed, covering 70,000 square metres; the North British Hotel is also built

1903: Caledonian Hotel opens; world's first floral clock installed in West Princes Street Gardens

1905: Moray House in Canongate becomes a teacher training centre

1905–1906: King's Theatre is built at Tollcross

1907: Work begins on constructing the Edinburgh College of Art

1908: Scottish National Exhibition held in Saughton Park

1910: First electric trams run; Bank of Scotland has 169 branches

1910–1913: Scottish National Zoological Park laid out at Corstorphine

1910–1914: Usher Hall is built

1911: Empire Palace Theatre, now Festival Theatre, partially burns down during The Great Lafayette's final act. 10 people die, including The Great Lafayette, and the theatre is closed while the stage is rebuilt and reopened in 1913; 'Cooke's Circus', East Fountainbridge converted to the Palladium Cinema

1912: La Scala Electric Theatre (cinema) opens in Nicolson Street; the first purpose-built cinema in the city, the Haymarket, opens in Dalry Road

1914: Sixteen players of Heart of Midlothian F.C. enlist for active service in the Great War; seven players from the first team are subsequently killed in action; construction of HM Prison Edinburgh begins

1915: Funeral and burial of victims of the Quintinshill rail disaster at Rosebank Cemetery

1916: Zeppelin raid causes 11 fatalities; Bank of Scotland has first female employee

1916–1918: Tanks are built by Brown Brothers in the city

1920: Edinburgh Extension Act: Leith, Colinton, Corstorphine, Cramond, Gilmerton, Liberton and Longstone incorporated into city

1921: Garrick Theatre in Grove Street burns down

1923: Edinburgh Corporation Tramways operates its last cable-hauled tram; last hanging takes place at the Calton Prison (executions continue at HM Prison Edinburgh)

1925: The National Library of Scotland is formed from the non-legal collections of the Advocates Library; Murrayfield Stadium opens

1926: Calton Prison closes and later demolish in the 1930s

1928: The inaugural non-stop Flying Scotsman train hauled by the Flying Scotsman locomotive – regular journey time between Edinburgh and London cut to 7 hours 30 minutes; the city's first traffic lights are at Broughton Street

1928–1939: Edinburgh's first Speedway track operates at Marine Gardens, Portobello

1929: Statues of Wallace and Bruce unveiled at the castle as part of sexcentenary celebrations to mark the granting of Robert the Bruce's burgh charter; Playhouse cinema opens; crematorium opens at Warriston Cemetery

1930: BBC moves its Scottish headquarters from Glasgow to Edinburgh Queen Street (until 1935); actor Sean Connery born in Fountainbridge

1932: George Watson's College moves to Morningside

1934: Royal visit of King George V and Queen Mary; several people injured in disturbances when Sir Oswald Mosley addresses a Fascist rally at the Usher Hall

1934–1937: Construction of Sheriff Courthouse (now the High Court of Justiciary) in the Lawnmarket

1935: Ross Bandstand replaces the Victorian bandstand in Princes Street Gardens

1935–1939: St. Andrew's House built on site of recently demolished Calton Prison to house the Scottish Office and offices of the Secretary of State for Scotland

1936: 17 per cent of Edinburgh's houses are overcrowded; Portobello Open Air Bathing Pool opens

1939: The Bank of Scotland has 266 branches; the headquarters of Edinburgh Savings Bank is built

1943: The North of Scotland Hydro-Electric Board is created, with its headquarters in Edinburgh

1946: A telephone upgrade takes place, allowing all-city dialling; major fire closes down the Theatre Royal, Broughton Street, the last of four Theatres Royal to be burnt out on this site

1946–1947: Electric trams in the city carry 16 million passengers a month

1947: Edinburgh International Festival is launched; Turnhouse aerodrome becomes Edinburgh's civil airport; restoration of the Canongate begins

1948: First Military Tattoo performed at the castle (becomes an official part of the Festival in 1950)

1948–1954: Speedway racing revived at Old Meadowbank stadium, home of Leith Athletic F.C. (and again between 1960 and 1967)

1949: The Abercrombie Plan proposes major road developments in Edinburgh which remain unimplemented

1950: Tram system begins to be run down; the first Royal Edinburgh Military Tattoo on the Castle Esplanade attracts around 6000 spectators

1951: March of the Thousand Pipers on Princes Street and Gathering of the Clans at Murrayfield Stadium; two central (manual) phone exchanges handle over 9,500 lines

1952: Bank of Scotland takes over Union Bank of Scotland, giving 453 combined branches; Murrayfield Ice Arena (built 1938–39) opens after use as army depot since outbreak of war; Cold War bunker at Barnton Quarry established at site of wartime operations room

1953: First royal visit of Queen Elizabeth to Edinburgh following her coronation. She attended a National Service at St Giles' Cathedral on 24 June

1954: Last judicial execution (by hanging) takes place at Saughton Prison

1955: Museum of Childhood, the world's first museum dedicated to childhood, opens; C&A Modes department store on Princes Street destroyed by fire

1956: Edinburgh Corporation Tramways operates for the last time on 16 November; National Library of Scotland opens; USSR premier Nikolai Bulganin and Communist Party Secretary Nikita Khrushchev visit Holyrood Palace and Scottish National War Memorial

1958: Queen receives last debutantes at Holyrood Palace

1959: Old Town population declines to 2,000

1961: Muriel Spark's novel The Prime of Miss Jean Brodie is published

1962: State visit of King Olav of Norway; the Union Canal, having fallen into disuse, officially closes

1963: Evening Despatch and Edinburgh Evening News merge; Gaumont Cinema fire leads to closure (demolished three years later); Empire Theatre becomes bingo hall; Traverse Theatre opens in Lawnmarket

1964: Rock group The Beatles perform at the ABC Cinema, Lothian Road; The Rolling Stones perform at the Usher Hall and return the following year

1965: Princes Street railway station closes; the City Planning Committee announces the building of an inner ring road in the form of a partly elevated six-lane highway encircling central Edinburgh, but the plan is abandoned after public opposition and the negative findings of a public inquiry held at the end of 1967

1966: Heriot-Watt gains university status

1967: Mortonhall Crematorium is dedicated

1968: Palladium Theatre fails, and becomes a disco

1968–1969: The Royal Bank of Scotland takes over National Commercial Bank of Scotland

1969: Bank of Scotland absorbs British Linen Bank; Tollcross Bus Depot closes

1970: City hosts the 9th Commonwealth Games; the St James' Centre, including New St. Andrews House, is completed

1971: Tom Farmer starts Kwik Fit

1972: A youth hostel opens at Eglinton Crescent; Bell's Mills are destroyed by an explosion; Eurovision Song Contest held in Usher Hall

1975: Local government reorganisation replaces Edinburgh Corporation with Lothian Regional Council and the City of Edinburgh District Council; Balerno, Currie, Ratho, Newbridge, Kirkliston and South Queensferry are included within the city boundary

1976: A new Fountain Brewery is built by Scottish & Newcastle (the last of its buildings demolished in 2012)

1980: Debenhams open a Princes Street store

1980s: Restoration of houses in the Old Town leads to a population increase in the area

1981: Royal Insurance Group headquarters moves to Glasgow

1984: Mikhail Gorbachev, Chairman for the Foreign Affairs Committee of the Soviet Union, stays at Holyrood Palace during his visit to Scotland

1985: The population of the city is 440,000; Edinburgh University institutes a Chair of Parapsychology; Portobello Open Air Bathing Pool closes

1986: City hosts the 13th Commonwealth Games

1988: Eleanor McLaughlin becomes Edinburgh's first female Lord Provost

1989: National Gallery of Scotland renovated

1990: Edinburgh Castle is first, and Holyrood Palace eighth, in ranking of paid Scottish tourist attractions

1993: First Edinburgh Hogmanay Street Party held as an organised event

1994: Murrayfield Stadium rebuilt

1995: Cutty Sark Tall Ships at Leith Docks; Infirmary Street baths close

1996: The City of Edinburgh Council is created, replacing the former District and Regional Councils; the Stone of Destiny transported from Westminster Abbey to Edinburgh Castle

1998: The Museum of Scotland is built as an extension to the Royal Scottish Museum.

1999: The Scottish Parliament is opened by Queen Elizabeth in the Assembly Hall on The Mound

== Twenty-first century ==
2002: A major fire destroys part of the Cowgate and buildings on the South Bridge; first Edinburgh Makar appointed, Stewart Conn

2003: MTV Europe Music Awards held at Ocean Terminal, Leith; the Royal Infirmary of Edinburgh moves to Little France

2004: The Scottish Parliament Building opens

2005: An estimated 225,000 people march through the city as part of the "Make Poverty History" campaign, calling on world leaders to act at the G8 summit being held at Gleneagles.

2008: Work begins on new tramway (the project is beset by difficulties, taking six years to lay 14 km of track)

2009: City hosts the biggest international clan gathering as part of Homecoming Scotland

2010: Pope Benedict XVI received by Queen Elizabeth at Holyrood Palace at the start of his state visit to Great Britain.

2010–13: Waverley Station roof renovated

2011: The Scottish National Portrait Gallery opens after two years long renovation; the city hosts Armed Forces Day; two giant pandas from China, Yang Guang and Tian Tian, arrive at Edinburgh Zoo

2012: The Edinburgh Agreement between the Scottish Government and the UK Government on the terms of the Scottish independence referendum 2014 is signed in Edinburgh.

2013: To mark the 500th anniversary of the Battle of Flodden, a minute's silence for the town's dead is observed at the Mercat Cross on 8 September.

2014: Completion of new tramway between the city centre and Edinburgh Airport

== See also ==
- History of Edinburgh
- Scotland
- History of Scotland
- Timeline of Scottish history
- Timeline of Glasgow history

== Notes ==
- Fry, Michael (2010). Edinburgh : a history of the city (New ed.). London: Pan. ISBN 978-0-330-45579-4.
