= HMS Spartiate =

HMS Spartiate has been the name of two ships of the Royal Navy. The first was a captured French prize, the second was mostly likely named after this ship.

- HMS Spartiate (1798) was a 74-gun third-rate ship of the line. She was captured from the French at the Battle of the Nile and fought at the Battle of Trafalgar on the British side.
- HMS Spartiate (1898) was a Diadem-class cruiser launched in 1898 and broken up in 1932.

HMS Spartiate was also a former Royal Navy shore establishment in St Enoch's Hotel Glasgow Western Approaches Command, Clyde
