= Castle Terrace =

Castle Terrace may refer to:

== United Kingdom ==
- Castle Terrace, Chepstow
- Castle Street, Oxford
- Castle Terrace, Edinburgh
  - Castle Terrace Car Park, Edinburgh, a Category B listed car park

== United States ==
- Castle Terrace Historic District, Clinton, Iowa
