= Portsburgh =

Burgh of barony in Edinburgh, Scotland

Coordinates: 55°56′40″N 3°11′30″W

Portsburgh was a burgh of barony comprising two discontiguous areas, Wester Portsburgh and Easter Portsburgh, outside the city walls of Edinburgh, Scotland from 1649 to 1856, taking its name from their respective town gates, the West Port and Bristo Port. It extended from Lochrin in the west to Drummond Street in the east, and from King's Stables Road in the north to the Meadows in the south. The name survives in Portsburgh Square off the West Port.
