= West Port, Edinburgh =

Street in Edinburgh, Scotland

West Port
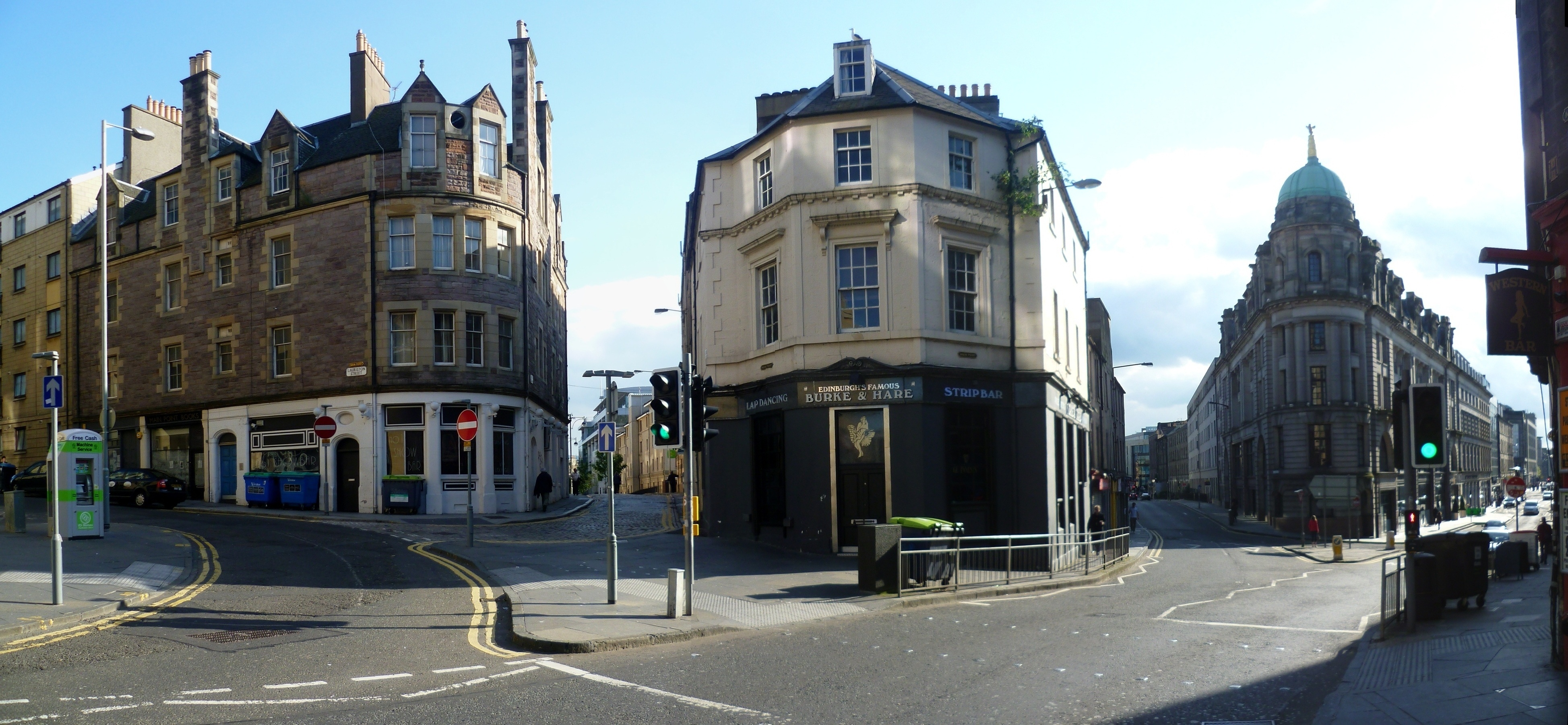
- Main Point, the historic junction of the three roads (2nd l. to r.) to Biggar, Glasgow and Stirling
- Interactive map of West Port
- Former name: Wester Portsburgh
- Length: 0.2 mi (0.32 km)
- Coordinates: 55°56′47″N 3°12′00″W
- west end: Main Point
- east end: Grassmarket

The West Port is a street in Edinburgh's Old Town, just south of Edinburgh Castle. It runs from the southwestern corner of the Grassmarket to Main Point, the junction of Bread Street, Lauriston Street, East Fountainbridge and High Riggs.

The street takes its name from the westernmost of the "ports" or gates in the Flodden Wall. The gate stood at the Grassmarket and opened onto the suburb of Portsburgh until it was demolished in the 1780s.

== The history of the street ==
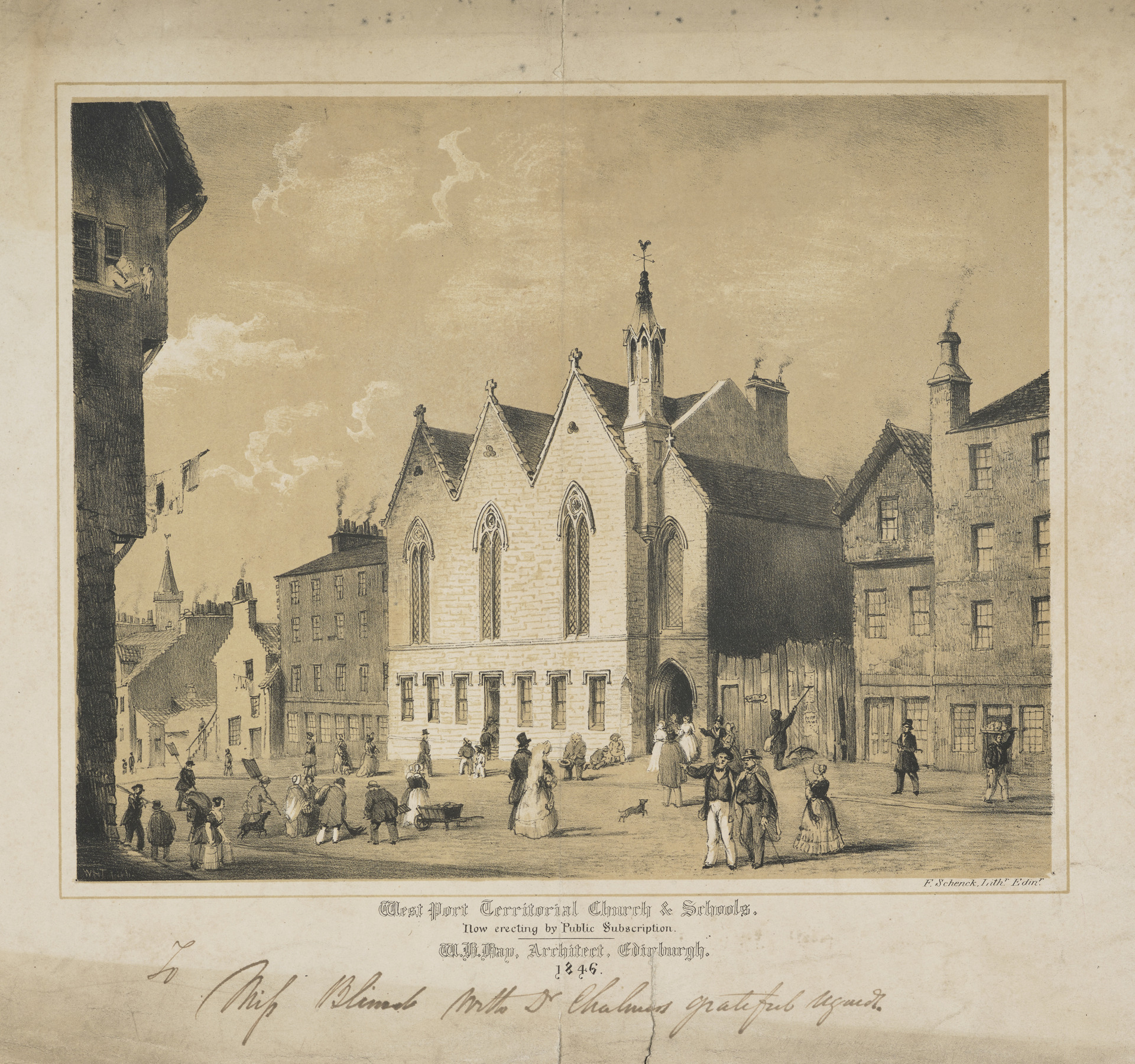
Chalmers' Free Church Experiment

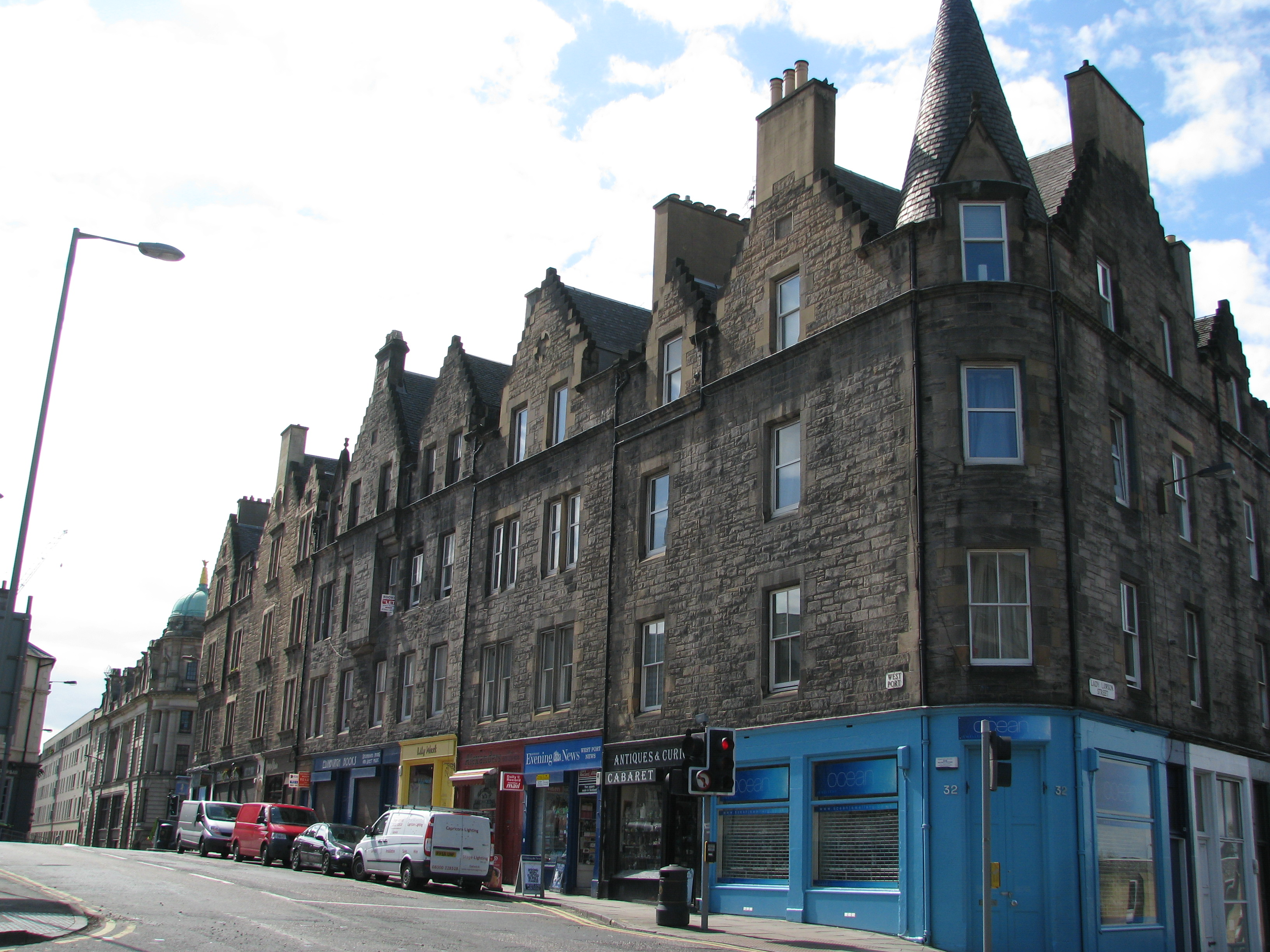
The north side of the West Port

=== Historic names for the street and area ===
Wester Portsburgh, as the area around the West Port was formerly known, was the main street through the western part of the burgh of Portsburgh - a burgh of barony from 1649 to 1856.

The name West Port originally referred only to the gate itself, but was used for the entire length of the street leading away from the gate in maps from around 1837 onwards. Wester Portsburgh still appeared as the name of the street on maps as late as 1831.

Portsburgh can also be seen as the name for the same street in a map from 1836. However, this does not serve to distinguish it from the eastern part of Portsburgh (Easter Portsburgh), which was still part of the same burgh at that date, the two parts of Portsburgh having their own administrative systems and baillies.

=== Historic events and famous residents ===
- Margaret Tudor was given the keys of Edinburgh at the West Port in 1503.
- King Charles I entered Edinburgh by the West Port in the year of his Scottish Coronation, 1633.
- "In 1650, when an English invasion was expected, many houses in Potterrow, as well as the West Port, were demolished by order of the magistrates, that the guns of the castle, and those on the city wall might have free action to play upon the enemy".
- According to the poem by Walter Scott, "Bonnie Dundee" left Edinburgh by the West Port, though historical accounts state that he left by the Netherbow Port.
- The Porteous Riots started with a mob at Portsburgh.
- James Hogg says in Confessions of a Justified Sinner that he had lodgings in Portsburgh.
- The West Port murders were so named as many of the victims were tempted back to Hare's lodgings in Tanner's Close, off the West Port, to be murdered. The site is now occupied by Argyle House.
- The "West Port Experiment" was a model for parochial engagement, conceived by Thomas Chalmers, with a church/school built on the south side of the street to facilitate this.

== Recent history and the modern-day street ==
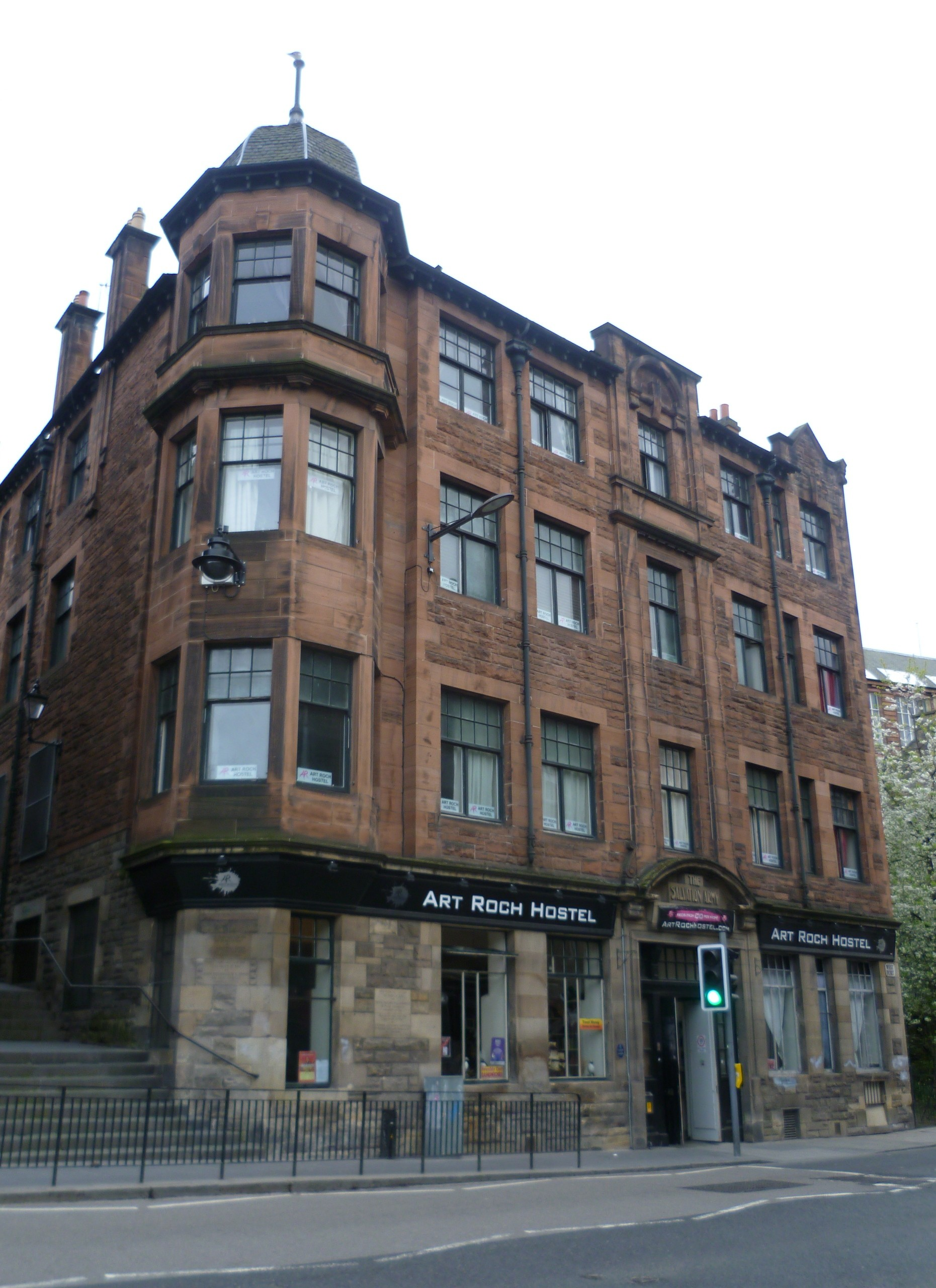
Former Salvation Army Hostel

- Portsburgh Church is on a buildings at risk register.
- The Vennel off the junction of West Port and the Grassmarket was used in the film 'The Prime of Miss Jean Brodie' (1969) when Brodie takes her girls on a walk through the Old Town, ending up in Greyfriars Kirkyard.

=== Notable buildings still in existence ===
==== Buildings built before the 21st century ====
The Art Nouveau Salvation Army women's hostel at the corner of the Grassmarket, the Vennel, was built in 1910 and is C-listed. Edinburgh College of Art purchased and used the hostel in addition to the next-door Portsburgh Church, entered via the Vennel. Planning permission was granted in October 2007 for the two buildings to be changed to serviced apartments.

The name of Portsburgh Square on the north side of West Port is a reminder of the area's former name.

==== 21st-century developments ====
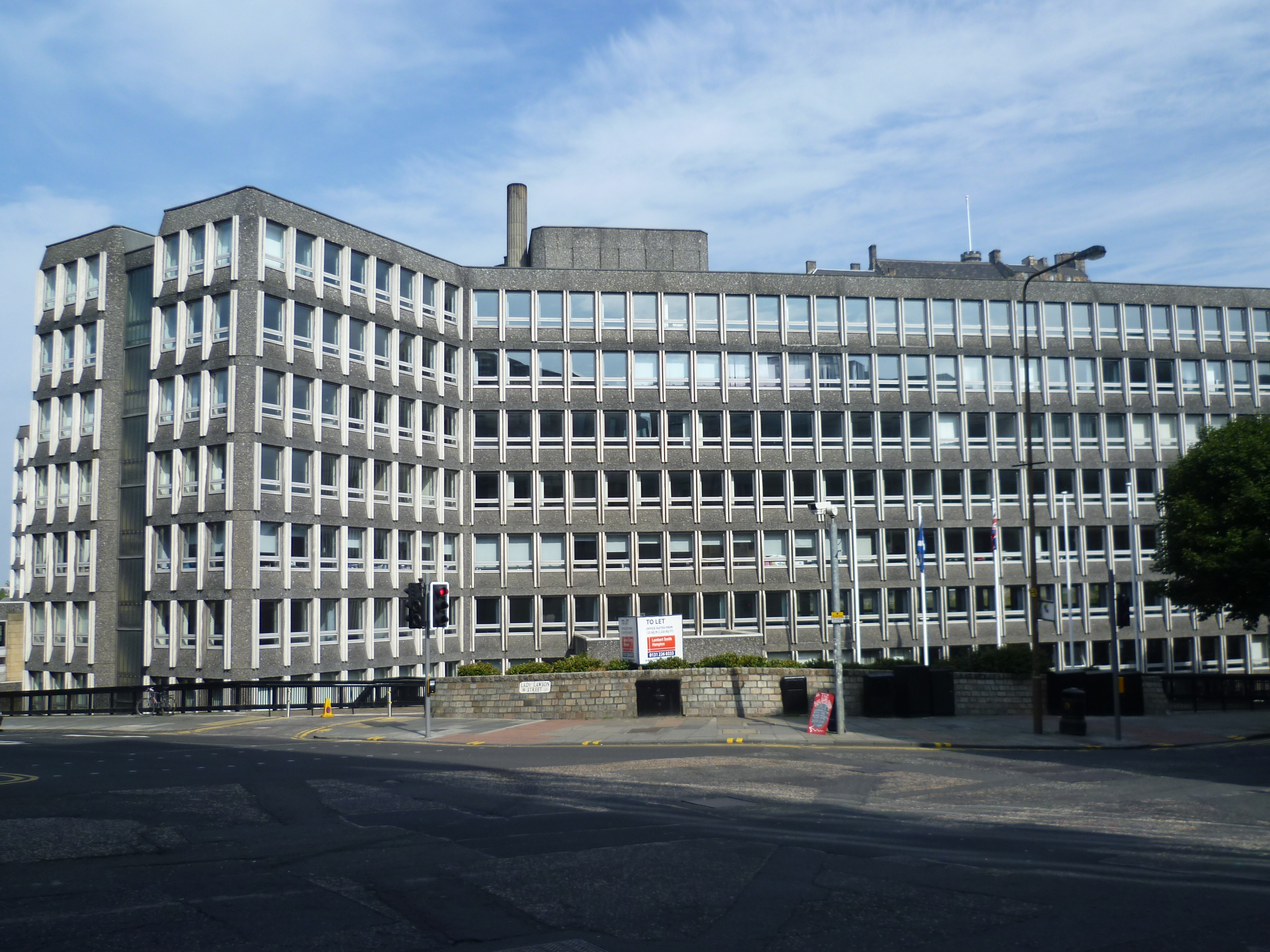
Argyle House in 2010

Dominating the north side of the West Port at its junction with Lady Lawson Street is Argyle House, built in 1968 to designs by Michael Laird and Partners. Long used as local and national government offices, it now houses CodeBase, the largest tech incubator in Scotland, University of Edinburgh offices, along with various other businesses.

Evolution House, the newest building of the Edinburgh College of Art stands on the south east corner of West Port and Lady Lawson Street.

Westport 102 was constructed on the West Port side of the block between Lady Lawson Street and Lauriston Street on the site of the old Post Office headquarters, which famously collapsed during demolition in 2007, leading to several roads being closed in the area for an extended period of time.

== See also ==
- Grassmarket
- Tollcross, Edinburgh
- West Port Book Festival
