= List of town defences in Scotland =

Key to the town defences in Scotland:
Designated Grade B listed (B)
Designated Grade C listed (C)
Designated Scheduled Monument (SM)
Town wall or defence with a National Record of the Historic Environment (NRHE) ID

This list of town defences in Scotland identifies both the defensive walls and stone walls that were built around towns and cities in Scotland. Scottish burghs were rarely enclosed by walls unlike many English and Welsh cities and towns such as York, Caernarfon or Chester. Gates, known in Scotland as ports, were often established to control who or what went into and out of the city or town, They were used to collect tolls and duties, rather than to defend the town from invaders, such as Aberdeen who never had a town wall.

== List ==
Key to Scottish heritage status
Status	Criteria
B	Grade B listed. Building of special architectural or historic interest which are major examples of a particular period, style or building type
C	Grade C listed. Building of special architectural or historic interest which are representative examples of a period, style or building type.
SM	Scheduled Monument. Nationally important archaeological building.
NRHE	Historic Environment Scotland database entry with a National Record of the Historic Environment (NRHE) ID
Note: The term "building" includes structures such as walls and bridges.

Name	Reference(s)	County	Heritage status	Condition	Image	Notes
Aberlady town wall		East Lothian	C	Substantial remains		Historic Environment Scotland listing as Aberlady, Back Lane, Town Wall. The wall is approximately 510 m (1,670 ft) long, which incorporates an earlier town wall.
Dunbar town wall		East Lothian	NRHE	Masonry fragments.		Historic Environment Scotland listing as Dunbar Town Wall and classified as Town Wall (Post Medieval). A fragment of Dunbar Town Wall was found at 24 High Street. The wall varies in height from 12 m (39 ft) to 6 m (20 ft) and it's about 1 m (3.3 ft) thick. The remains of Dunbar Town wall are described as being considerably restored.
Dundee town wall		Dundee City	NRHE	One gatehouse (port) and vestiges		Historic Environment Scotland listing as Dundee, East (Cowgate) Port, Wishart Arch classified as Town Wall (16th Century) and Gateway (Period Unassigned). "By the end of the (16th) century, however, the town had invested heavily in the upgrading of existing ports and the building of a stone wall to surround the town"
Edinburgh town walls (King's Wall, Flodden Wall, Telfer Wall)		City of Edinburgh	SM	Substantial remains		Scheduled Monument (SM) listings: Edinburgh Town Wall, Flodden Wall and Telfer Wall, Heriot Place. SM number: SM2901; Edinburgh Town Wall, Flodden Wall, Johnston Terrace to Grassmarket. SM number: SM3012
Edinburgh town walls (King's Wall, Flodden Wall, Telfer Wall)		City of Edinburgh	B	Substantial remains		Historic Environment Scotland listing as High Street, Tweedale Court, Walling to West of Court and to South of Tweedale House
Haddington town wall		East Lothian	B	One gatehouse (port) and vestiges		Historic Environment Scotland listing as Town Wall (Haddington) states that "Portions of the old town walls remain, mostly rebuilt, lining the Butts and on the North side of the town."
Inverkeithing town wall		Fife	C	Masonry fragments		Historic Environment Scotland listing as Roman Road, Town Wall states that "This small section of medieval town wall is the only fragment remaining in Inverkeithing. Stone walls were built around Inverkeithing following a mandate to further fortify the burgh with dykes, ditches and catapults in 1557."
Kirkcudbright town wall		Dumfries and Galloway	NRHE	Vestiges		Historic Environment Scotland listing as Kirkcudbright, Meickle Yett and Town Wall states that "The town defences of 1547, when Kirkcudbright was besieged by the English under Sir Thomas Carleton, consisted principally, on the east, of a broad marshy creek extending south from the harbour to the Meickle Yett. Here a wall and ditch ran west to where the Academy stands and turned north to the riverside."
Lauder town wall		Scottish Borders	NRHE	No remains		Historic Environment Scotland listing as Lauder, Town Wall states "Where the West Port had been, there was till lately a crumbling remnant of the old town wall."
Montrose town wall		Angus	B	Fragments		Historic Environment Scotland listing as West End Park and Western Road, fragments of Old Town Walls
Peebles town wall		Scottish Borders	SM	Vestiges with one remaining corner bastion.		Scheduled Monument listing as Peebles, town wall. Scheduled Monument number: SM2685
Perth town wall		Perth and Kinross	NRHE	One remaining section		Historic Environment Scotland listing as Perth, Town Defences states "In 1311-12 Perth was a place of great strength fortified on three sides by a thick wall having stone towers at the angles and over the gates and surrounded by a wet ditch."
St Andrews town wall		Fife	SM	Only two gatehouses (ports) remain (right)		St Andrews has never had a defensive wall as such, it was intended purely to impress people entering the city. There are two 'ports', or gates, still inexistance. West Port (left upper) which was built in 1587 and rebuilt in 1843, the other being Sea Yett or Mill Port (left lower). The Scheduled Monument listing as West Port, St Andrews. Scheduled Monument number: SM90263
Stirling town wall		Stirling	SM	Substantial remains		The wall stands between about 4.8 m (16 ft) and 7 m (23 ft) in height and is about 1.8 m (5.9 ft) thick. Scheduled Monument listing as Stirling, town wall & bastion & Port Street Bastion at 44 Bastion Wynd. Scheduled Monument number: SM1754

== See also ==
- Derry city walls
- List of town walls in England and Wales
- List of cities with defensive walls
