= Argyle House, Edinburgh =

Coordinates: 55.9467°N 3.2010°W

Argyle House
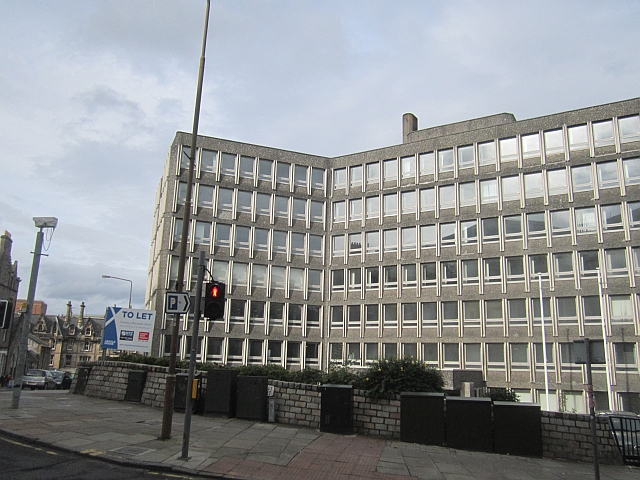
- Interactive map of the Argyle House area

General information
- Location: 3 Lady Lawson St, Edinburgh EH3 9DS, Edinburgh, Scotland, United Kingdom
- Year built: 1968
- Owner: PGIM

Design and construction
- Architects: Michael Laird & Partners

Argyle House is a building in Edinburgh, Scotland. The building is located in the city's Old Town on Lady Lawson Street and Castle Terrace. Completed in 1968, it was originally used as government offices, but has since been sold many times. Today, it is used as office space by over a dozen companies and institutions, including the University of Edinburgh. The building has a series of relief panels facing Castle Terrace (opposite Castle Terrace Car Park).

== History ==
Argyle House sits in West Port in the city's Old Town. Designed by Michael Laird and Ian Rogers, it finished construction in 1968. Initially leased to the government by the local council, it was acquired by PGIM in 2023 for £38 million. It was previously owned by Kennedy Wilson, who had bought it from Fordgate in 2014. The building was subsequently used by the University of Edinburgh and the tech company CodeBase.

In November 2025, a proposal of application notice (PAN) was submitted to Edinburgh council with plans for the demolition of the existing building and redevelopment of site as a mixed hotel, office, flats and retail space.

== In film ==
The building featured extensively as a fictional police station in the TV show Dept. Q.
