= Castle Terrace Historic District =

Historic district in Iowa, United States

- U.S. National Register of Historic Places
- U.S. Historic district
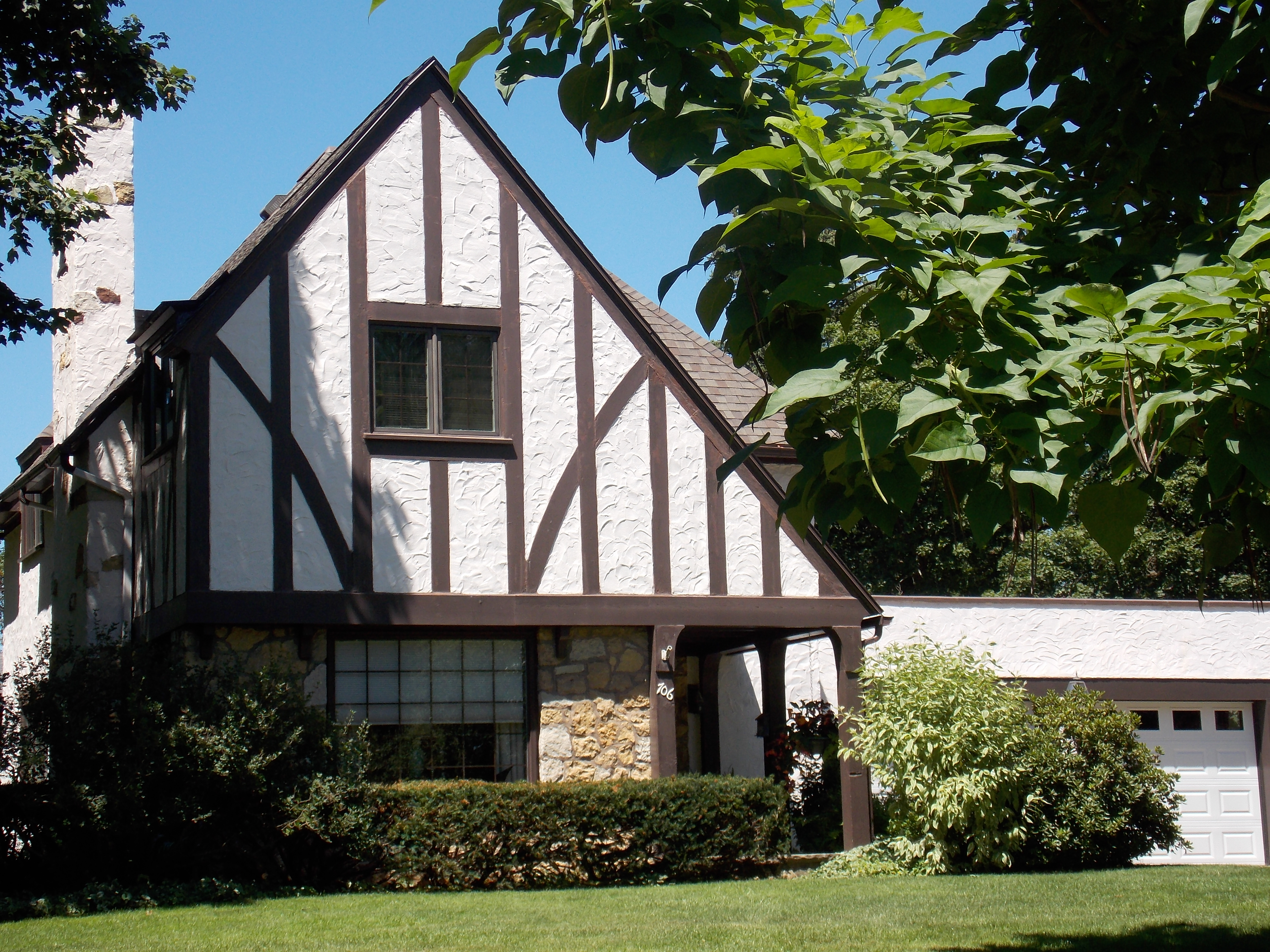
- House at 706 Terrace Drive

- Location within Iowa Location within the United States
- Location: Roughly along the junction of Terrace Dr. and Caroline Ave., Clinton, Iowa
- Coordinates: 41°50′17″N 90°13′2″W
- Architect: E.E. Green
- Architectural style: Tudor Revival
- MPS: Clinton, Iowa MPS
- NRHP reference No.: 97001607
- Added to NRHP: January 7, 1998

The Castle Terrace Historic District is located in Clinton, Iowa, United States. The area was platted in 1892 and developed about 1926 by the Curtis Service Bureau of the Curtis Company. They were woodwork manufacturers in Clinton and used the development as a promotional project to showcase the company's products for developers, architects, and builders. It was situated on eleven lots and featured trees, curving streets, and spacious lawns, which gave the area a village atmosphere. The utility lines were placed underground. E. E. Green was the Architect-in-Charge. The architectural style was highly eclectic with Tudor Revival the primary style utilized in the district. The historic district was listed on the National Register of Historic Places in 1998.
