= Castle Terrace Car Park =

Multistory car park in Edinburgh, Scotland

Coordinates: 55.9479°N 3.2033°W

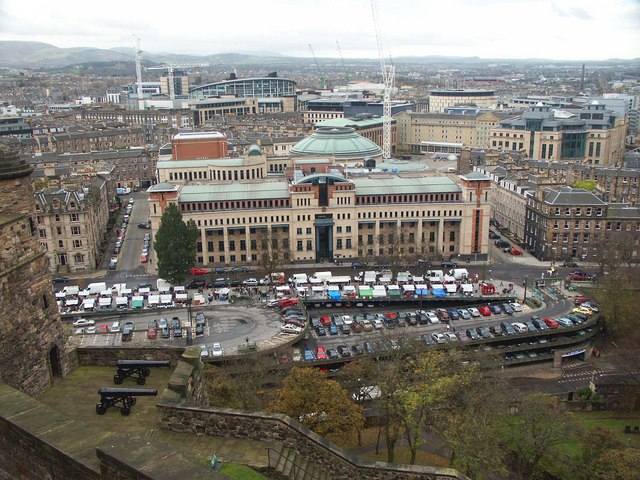
Castle Terrace Car Park and Saltire Court

Castle Terrace Car Park is a car park in Edinburgh in the brutalist style which was designated as a listed building in October 2019. It is situated across from Argyle House on Castle Terrace road.

Opened in 1964 and finished around 1966, it is the first modern multistorey car park built in Scotland, and an early European example of the continuous ramp model. It has remained broadly unaltered since 1966 and is noted for being sensitively designed so as not to interfere with views of Edinburgh Castle.

Commissioned by the Edinburgh Corporation, the car park was designed and built by Kinnear & Gordon and T. Waller Marwick & Associates between 1959 and 1966. The continuous ramp was inspired by a car park built in Nyropsgade, Copenhagen in 1958.

The car park features in the film T2 Trainspotting.
