= Drummond Street, Edinburgh =

Street in Edinburgh, Scotland

Drummond Street
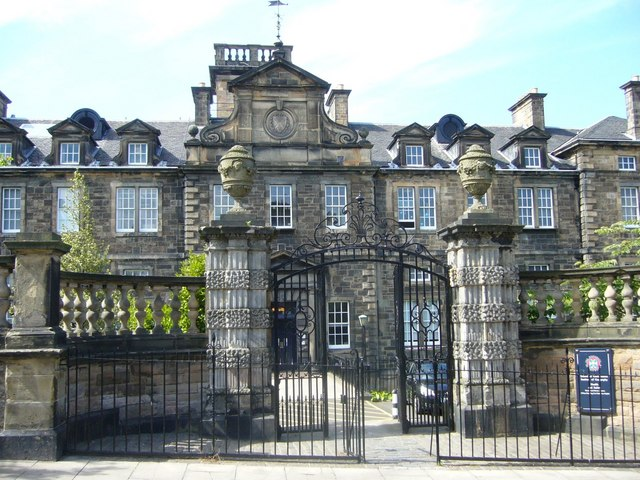
- The building which houses the university's Institute of Geography, was once part of the Edinburgh Royal Infirmary
- Interactive map of Drummond Street
- Former name: Back Wall
- Length: 0.2 mi (0.32 km)
- Postal code: EH8 9
- Coordinates: 55.94775°N 3.18402°W
- west end: A7, South Bridge
- east end: Pleasance

Drummond Street is a street just outside Edinburgh's Old Town, near the famous Royal Mile and Holyrood. The street connects the South Bridge (A7), where it is opposite the Old College, and the Pleasance. The street is paved with granite setts. It is in an area with several university properties and is home to many students as well as pubs and restaurants.

== Name ==
Originally called Back Wall as the street was just outside the city wall, it was from the 1850s named after George Drummond.

== History ==
One famous former resident is David Bowie, who shared a small basement flat in Drummond Street with the mime artist Lindsay Kemp for several months in the early 1970s.

The street is the site of the former Drummond Street Surgical Hospital which was built in 1853 by David Bryce as an addition to the Royal Infirmary in Infirmary Street. The February 1850 Monthly Journal of Medical Science records the plans for building the hospital as follows:

The new building will stand upon an elevated piece of ground, presenting every facility for drainage, and will front Drummond Street. It will supersede the necessity for several out-buildings, in which surgical cases are at present rather uncomfortably accommodated, and which will be removed. The surgical hospital, in its new form, will contain beds for 200 patients.

— Monthly Journal of Medical Science

At the junction of Drummond Street and the Pleasance can be found some vestiges of a bastion of the Flodden Wall. The wall travels from that bastion along the north side of the street. The section fronting the old surgical hospital has been reduced to four feet in height but still comprises the stones of the original.

On 4 November 1857, John Gamgee set up the New Edinburgh Veterinary College, one of three veterinary colleges being established in Edinburgh at the time, in stable courtyard premises at 6 Drummond Street. The college received its royal sign manual, necessary to allow students to be examined by the Royal College of Veterinary Surgeons, in March 1859. Gamgee recognised that the Drummond Street location was not ideal and by 1862 had moved his college to the west side of Lothian Road on a site now occupied by the Caledonian Hotel.

Dr. John Smith, with his friends Frances Imlach, Peter Orphoot and Robert Nasmyth, opened the Edinburgh Dental Dispensary at 1 Drummond Street in January 1860. In 1862 it moved to premises in Cockburn Street.

At the west end of the street was Rutherford's Bar, patronized in the time of Robert Louis Stevenson and by members of The Speculative Society at the university. Their weekly meetings were held on Tuesdays, officially from 8 p.m. to midnight. Lord Guthrie, joint president of the society with Stevenson in the years 1872–1873 and 1873–1874, recalls in his personal memoirs of Stevenson:

About nine we adjourned for half an hour, when most members left "to buy pencils", as they gravely informed any new-comer, a euphemism for a visit to Rutherford's public-house in Drummond Street, otherwise (also euphemistically) known as "The Pump".

— Lord Guthrie, Robert Louis Stevenson Some Personal Recollections

The premises were remodelled in 1899 and had a U-shaped bar. The internal fittings were lost in further modernization. The property is now an Italian restaurant, the decor of which is in homage to Stevenson's Treasure Island. Surviving from 1899 is the timber Ionic pilastered frontage with the trademark of Rutherford and Company (dated 1834) in an arched panel above.

A former first floor café on the corner with Nicolson Street is reputedly where J. K. Rowling began writing the Harry Potter series.
