= CodeBase =

- Formation: 2014
- Headquarters: CodeBase Edinburgh: 37a Castle Terrace, Edinburgh, EH1 2EL
- Products: Techscaler, LawtechUK, AgriTech Bridge, Care and HealthTech Bridge, Sustainability Bridge, Cyber Bridge, ClimateTech Community, Greentech Futures Edinburgh
- Services: Workspace, Education, Programmes, Community
- CEO: Stephen Coleman
- CSO: Steven Drost
- Website: https://www.thisiscodebase.com

CodeBase is a tech ecosystem support organisation that has supported over 500 startups and scaleups, who have collectively raised over £4 billion. CodeBase is promotes collaboration in tech innovation, by working with startups, scaleups, corporates, governments, academia and the third sector.

CodeBase provides the workspace environment for startups to grow, delivers expert educational programmes and industry accelerators, and fosters connections through events, meetups, mentorship matching, and corporate-startup collaboration programmes.

Launched in Edinburgh in 2014, CodeBase offers startup incubation space through hotdesking, coworking, and dedicated office space. Further hubs opened in Stirling, in 2017, followed by Aberdeen in 2019, along with popup hubs across the UK.

CodeBase is for startup founders, would-be founders, and employees across the UK - particularly within the tech ecosystem - who want to join a community of like-minded people, learn from others, and access support to help grow their business.

CodeBase works with businesses looking to innovate through collaboration with startups and tech businesses in their sectors. Governments and enterprise organisations looking for support in delivering large scale programmes.

== Partnerships ==
CodeBase has supported various companies including FanDuel, Cloudsoft, Administrate, Deliveroo, TV Squared, Outplay Entertainment, Rightscale, Speech Graphics, Square, and Skyscanner.

CodeBase has partnered with the Scottish Government, UK Government, Legal Geek, Barclays, Edinburgh City Council, Edinburgh Futures Institute, the University of Edinburgh, Opportunity North East (ONE) and more to deliver startup programmes.
