= Castle Terrace, Chepstow =

Row of Georgian dwellings in Wales

Coordinates: 51°38′38″N 2°40′25″W

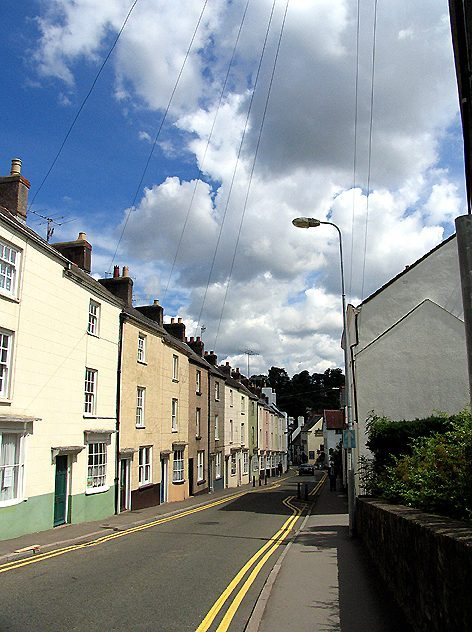
Part of Castle Terrace (on the left), looking northeastwards, downhill

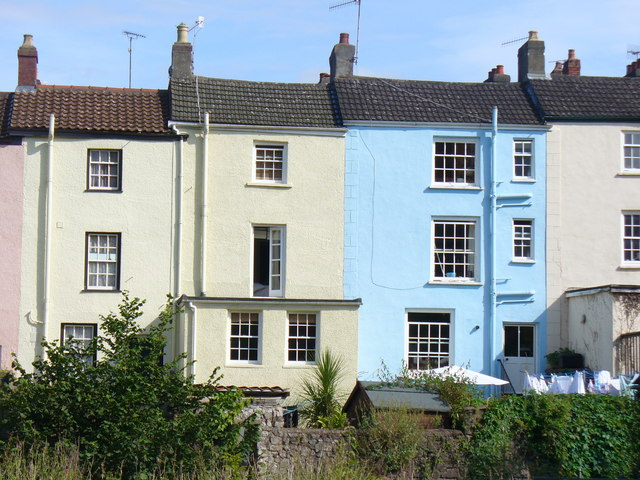
Rear view of part of the terrace

Castle Terrace, originally known as Castle Parade, is an unbroken row of fourteen three-storied Georgian dwellings in Chepstow, Monmouthshire, Wales. The backs of the houses face Chepstow Castle. The whole terrace, numbers 33A–47 Bridge Street, is a Grade II* listed building.

== History and architecture ==
The houses were constructed on mostly open land opposite the southern walls of the castle, between 1805 and 1822, by an unknown builder or builders probably in two stages. In 1816, the row, not yet completed, was named as Castle Parade, and the street which had previously been known as St Anne's Street was renamed Bridge Street to mark the opening of the new Wye bridge at the foot of the hill. The terrace was built at a time when Chepstow was a prosperous and developing port, particularly for the export of timber and bark (for tanning), used by the Royal Navy. At one time there was a local tradition that every bow-windowed house in the terrace was occupied by a sea captain.

The houses each have a single front bow window, with rendered walls and slate roofs. Architectural historian John Newman describes the terrace as "a charming row of three-storey cottages... [that] climbs the hill... These create quite a ripple, as each two-bay cottage has a bow - a few are missing at the upper end."

The terrace was given Grade II* listed building status on 14 March 1955, as "a virtually complete and picturesque Georgian terrace".
