= Dod's Peerage =

British peerage and honours directory

- Cover of the 1866 edition (Vol. 26)
- Author: Charles Roger Phipps Dod; Robert Phipps Dod
- Country: United Kingdom
- Language: English
- Genre: Reference work
- Publisher: Various (including Whittaker & Co. (George Byrom Whittaker; 1793–1847); George Bell & Sons; Sampson Low (1797–1886), Marston & Co. (Edward Marston); Dod's Peerage Ltd.)
- Published: 1841–1960s
- Media type: Print (hardcover)
- OCLC: 6308211

Dod's Peerage (originally titled, The Peerage, Baronetage, Knightage, Great Britain and Ireland, Including All the Titled Classes) was a long-running annual reference work, published annually, that listed members of the British aristocracy and titled classes. First published in 1841 by Charles Roger Phipps Dod, the series was an information source for peerage, baronetage, knightage, and later other dignitaries such as bishops, members of the Privy Council, and Companions of various orders.

== History ==
Charles R. Dod (1793–1855), a parliamentary reporter and compiler, began the publication as a more frequently updated alternative to existing works like Debrett's Peerage and Burke's Peerage. After his death, the work was continued by his son, Robert Phipps Dod (c. 1822–1865), and various successors. The title and format evolved over the decades, but the purpose remained to provide reliable, up-to-date biographical information on Britain's titled classes.

== Editions and Publishers ==
The series was initially printed by Gilbert and Rivington and published by Whittaker & Co. Later publishers included George Bell & Sons; Sampson Low, Marston & Company; and eventually Dod's Peerage, Limited, based at 12 Mitre Court Chambers, Temple, London. Over time, it was also distributed by Simpkin, Marshall, Hamilton, Kent & Co., Ltd.

Dod's Peerage was published annually from 1841 into the 20th century, with extant copies recorded as late as the 1960s. Editions were often issued in two parts, with supplemental updates mid-year. Many of these volumes are now freely available via digital libraries such as Internet Archive, Google Books, and HathiTrust.

== Content and Scope ==
Dod's Peerage provided biographical entries for peers, baronets, knights, and other dignitaries, including relevant dates, titles, offices, and family information. Unlike some competitors, it emphasized brevity and regular updating over genealogical or heraldic detail. Later volumes expanded the scope to include bishops, Privy Councillors, and other holders of national honours.

== Legacy ==
Throughout the Victorian and Edwardian periods, Dod's Peerage was regarded as a practical reference work and was widely used by journalists, civil servants, and members of Parliament. Though eventually supplanted by other publications and databases, it remains a valuable historical source.

== Extant online copies ==
- Dod, Charles Roger Phipps (1793–1855); Dod, Robert Phipps (c.1822–1865) (1841–1960). The Peerage, Baronetage, Knightage, of Great Britain and Ireland, Including All the Titled Classes. LCCN sv87-62818; OCLC 6308211 (all editions), OCLC 124051820 (all editions).
1. Various eds. – via HathiTrust.
2. ↓ Title → The Peerage, Baronetage, Knightage, Great Britain and Ireland, Including All the Titled Classes
3. ↓ Author → Dod, Charles Roger Phipps (1793–1855)
4. ↓ Printer → Gilbert and Rivington, Printers, St. John's Square → Richard Gilbert (1794–1852) and William Rivington (1807–1888).
5. Vol. 4. 1844 – via Internet Archive (Allen County Public Library).
6. Vol. 6. 1846 – via Google Books (BSB).
7. Vol. 14. 1854.
  1. Part 1 – via Internet Archive (Allen County Public Library).
  2. Part 2 – via Internet Archive (Allen County Public Library).
8. Vol. 15. 1855 – via Google Books (Virginia).
9. ↓ Author → Dod, Robert Phipps (c. 1822–1865)
10. Vol. 16. 1856 – via Internet Archive (Harvard).
11. Vol. 16. 1856 – via Google Books (Harvard).
12. Vol. 16. 1856 – via HathiTrust (Princeton).
13. Vol. 17. 1857 – via HathiTrust (Princeton).
14. Vol. 19. 1859 – via HathiTrust (Rutgers).
15. ↓ Title → Dod's Peerage, Baronetage, Knightage of Great Britain and Ireland
16. ↓ Publisher → London: Whittaker & Co., Ave Maria Lane → George Byrom Whittaker (1793–1847)
17. Vol. 20. 1860 – via Google Books (Oxford).
18. Vol. 22. 1862 – via Google Books (Oxford).
19. Vol. 23. 1863 – via Google Books (BC).
20. Vol. 24. 1864 – via Google Books (Oxford).
21. Vol. 25. 1865 – via HathiTrust (Rutgers).
22. Vol. 26. 1866 – via Internet Archive (Boston).
23. Vol. 30. 1870 – via Google Books (KBR).
24. Vol. 32. 1872 – via Internet Archive (Boston).
25. ↓ Publisher → London: Whittaker & Co., 2, White Hart Street, Paternoster Square, E.C. George Bell & Sons, York Street, Convent Garden, W.C.
26. Vol. 49. 1889.
  1. Part 1 – via Internet Archive (Allen County Public Library).
  2. Part 2 – via Internet Archive (Allen County Public Library).
27. ↓ Title → Dod's Peerage, Baronetage and Knightage of Great Britain and Ireland; Including All the Titled Classes.
28. ↓ Publisher → London: Sampson Low, Marston & Company Limited, St. Dunstan’s House, Fetter Lane, Fleet Street → Sampson Low (1797–1886); Edward Marston
29. Vol. 64. 1904 – via Google Books (Michigan).
30. ↓ Title → Dod's Peerage, Baronetage, Knightage, etc. of Great Britain and Ireland; Including Bishops, Members of the Privy Councils, Companions of All Orders, etc.
31. ↓ Publisher → London: Proprietors Dod's Peerage, Limited 12, Mitre Court Chambers, Temple, E.C. By Simpkin, Marshall, Hamilton, Kent & Co., Ltd.
32. Vol. 61. 1901 – via Google Books (Wisconsin).
33. Vol. 68. 1908.
  1. Part 1 – via Internet Archive (Allen County Public Library).
  2. Part 1 – via Internet Archive (Allen County Public Library).
  3. Part 2 – via Internet Archive (Allen County Public Library).
34. Vol. 69. 1909.
  1. Part 1 – via Internet Archive (Allen County Public Library).
  2. Part 2 – via Internet Archive (Allen County Public Library).
35. Vol. 70. 1910.
  1. Part 1 – via Internet Archive (Allen County Public Library).
  2. Part 2 – via Internet Archive (Allen County Public Library).
36. Vol. 71. 1911.
  1. Part 1 – via Internet Archive (Allen County Public Library).
  2. Part 2 – via Internet Archive (Allen County Public Library).
37. Vol. 72. 1912.
  1. Part 1 – via Internet Archive (Allen County Public Library).
  2. Part 2 – via Internet Archive (Allen County Public Library).
38. Vol. 73. 1913.
  1. Part 1 – via Internet Archive (Allen County Public Library).
  2. Part 2 – via Internet Archive (Allen County Public Library).
39. Vol. 74. 1914.
  1. Part 1 – via Internet Archive (Allen County Public Library).
  2. Part 2 – via Internet Archive (Allen County Public Library).
40. Vol. 75. 1915.
  1. Part 1 – via Internet Archive (Allen County Public Library).
  2. Part 1 – via Internet Archive (Allen County Public Library).
41. Vol. 76. 1916.
  1. Part 1 – via Internet Archive (Allen County Public Library).
  2. Part 2 – via Internet Archive (Allen County Public Library).
42. Vol. 77. 1917.
  1. Part 1 – via Internet Archive (Allen County Public Library).
  2. Part 2 – via Internet Archive (Allen County Public Library).
43. Vol. 78. 1918.
  1. Part 1 – via Internet Archive (Allen County Public Library).
  2. Part 1 – via Internet Archive (Allen County Public Library).
  3. Part 2 – via Internet Archive (Allen County Public Library).
44. Vol. 79. 1919.
  1. Part 1 – via Internet Archive (Allen County Public Library).
  2. Part 2 – via Internet Archive (Allen County Public Library).
45. Vol. 80. 1920.
  1. Part 1 – via Internet Archive (Allen County Public Library).
  2. Part 2 – via Internet Archive (Allen County Public Library).
46. Vol. 81. 1921.
  1. Part 1 – via HathiTrust (Michigan).
  2. Part 1 – via Internet Archive (Allen County Public Library).
  3. Part 2 – via Internet Archive (Allen County Public Library).
47. Vol. 83. 1923.
  1. Part 1 – via Internet Archive (Wellcome).
  2. Part 1 – via Internet Archive (Allen County Public Library).
  3. Part 2 – via Internet Archive (Allen County Public Library).
48. Supplement. 1915.
  1. For April 1915 – via Internet Archive (Allen County Public Library).
  2. For August 1915 – via Internet Archive (Allen County Public Library).
  3. For April 1915 – via Internet Archive (Allen County Public Library).
  4. For August 1915 – via Internet Archive (Allen County Public Library).

== See also ==
- Charles Roger Phipps Dod
- Debrett's
- Burke's Peerage
- Whitaker's Almanack

== Bibliography ==
=== References ===
- Examiner (The). Retrieved March 25, 2025.
1. "The Literary Examiner": "The Peerage, Baronetage, and Knightage of Great Britain and Ireland, for 1855 ..." (review). No. 2449. January 6, 1855. p. 5 (col 3, bottom) – via Internet Archive.
