= Clergy List =

Directory of Church of England

The Clergy List was a professional directory of the Church of England which appeared between 1841–1917. From the start it also covered Wales, together with more limited information relating to Scotland, Ireland, and other churches within the Anglican Communion.

== Background and early contents ==
An opportunity to compile and issue a new directory had been created by the effective disappearance of the earlier Clerical Guide or Ecclesiastical Directory, edited by Richard Gilbert, and also by the introduction of the much improved system of the Penny Post.

The basic contents of the Clergy List's earlier editions was summarised on their title pages:

- an alphabetical list of the clergy (or at least of those who held benefices)
- an alphabetical list of the benefices, with their post towns
- lists of the cathedral establishments
- benefices arranged under their ecclesiastical divisions
- lists of ecclesiastical preferments variously under the patronage of the Crown, the bishops, and the deans & chapters, etc.

The directory was always a bit less expensive than its later rival, Crockford's Clerical Directory, but not surprisingly it consequently offered considerably less in the way of biographical detail. This was especially true in the earlier editions which offered little or no information as to previous appointments, universities attended, or lists of publications by the clergy.

== Publishers and later history ==
The directory was initially published by Charles Cox at the Ecclesiastical Directory Office, Southampton Street, Strand. Cox – who in 1839 had taken over a periodical called the Ecclesiastical Gazette, originating during the previous year – was able to produce two separate editions during the Clergy List's inaugural year of 1841. Thereafter, it managed to maintain annual publication right up until adverse trading conditions forced its closure as a separate volume in 1917.

Cox remained as the Clergy List's publisher for many years, but by 1881 the title had been taken over by John Hall of Parliament Street, In 1888 it was further taken over by Hamilton, Adams & Company, of London's Paternoster Row. They had earlier acquired Thomas Bosworth's Clerical Guide and Ecclesiastical Directory, merging the two titles in 1889. During the following year the combined directory was still further transferred to Kelly & Company, the publishers of Kelly's Directories.

The later volumes were considerably expanded to include much greater biographical detail – broadly comparable with Crockford – but this was not sufficient to sustain the publication in the longer term. Over the years the number of pages also increased – ranging from around 300 in 1841 to around 700 by the 1890s.

After 1917 the Clergy List finally merged with its long-time rival, Crockford's Clerical Directory. At least as late as 1932 the latter continued to advertise on its preliminary pages that it "incorporated the Clergy List, the Clerical Guide and the Ecclesiastical Directory".

In recent years certain of the earlier editions of the Clergy List (including the first edition) have been reissued by various publishers – either on CD-ROM or in scanned format on the Internet.
