= Peter Cryle =

Australian scholar

- Born: Australia
- Awards: Chevalier dans l'Ordre des Palmes Académiques

Academic background
- Education: The University of Queensland, Université de Nice Sophia Antipolis

Academic work
- Institutions: The University of Queensland
- Notable works: French literature, Intellectual history, History of sexuality

Peter Cryle is an Australian scholar and emeritus professor, known for his contributions to the fields of French literature, intellectual history, and the history of sexuality. His research focuses on the representation of Psychosexual pathology in French fiction of the Fin de siècle, as well as the literature of the libertine Enlightenment. Cryle has authored numerous influential works, including studies on erotic narratives in French literature and the cultural constructions of sexual norms. He is a Fellow of the Australian Academy of the Humanities and has been honored as a Chevalier dans l'Ordre des Palmes Académiques for his academic achievements.

== Early life and education ==
Cryle completed his undergraduate studies at The University of Queensland, earning both a Bachelor of Arts with Honours and a Master of Arts. He later pursued his PhD at Université de Nice Sophia Antipolis. His academic trajectory has been focused on French literature, particularly the intersections of sexuality, literature, and intellectual history.

== Career and research ==
Cryle is an expert in the analysis of eroticism as a narrative tool in French fiction from the eighteenth and nineteenth centuries. He has published numerous books, articles, and book chapters, some of which have been influential in the fields of literary studies, history, and the philosophy of sexuality.

Cryle has engaged with academic discussions on eroticism, sexuality, and literature in France, particularly in relation to the Enlightenment and post-Enlightenment periods. His research explores libertine literature and the ethics of erotic narrative within the field of French literary studies. Additionally, Cryle's interdisciplinary approach to the history of sexuality examines both literary texts and historical discourses on sex and society.

== Publications ==
=== Books ===
- Cryle, P., & Stephens, E. (2017). Normality: A critical genealogy. University of Chicago Press.
- Cryle, P., & Moore, A. (2011). Frigidity: An intellectual history. Palgrave Macmillan.
- Cryle, P., & Forth, C. E. (2008). Sexuality at the fin de siècle: The makings of a "central problem". University of Delaware Press.
- Cryle, P., & O’Connell, L. (2004). Libertine enlightenment: Sex, liberty and licence in the eighteenth century. Palgrave Macmillan.
- Cryle, P. (2003). La crise du plaisir, 1740–1830. Presses Universitaires de Lille.
- Cryle, P. (2002). The telling of the act: Sexuality as narrative in eighteenth- and nineteenth-century France. University of Delaware Press.

=== Selected journal articles ===
- Cryle, P. (2024). The moral radicalism of libertine dalliance in eighteenth-century France.
- Cryle, P., & Stephens, E. (2021). Normality: A collection of essays. Introduction. History of the Human Sciences.
- Cryle, P. (2021). Hat sizes and craniometry: Professional know-how and scientific knowledge. History of the Human Sciences.
- Cryle, P., & Downing, L. (2010). The natural and the normal in the history of sexuality. Psychology and Sexuality.
- Cryle, P. (2015). Anachronistic readings of eighteenth-century libertinage in nineteenth- and twentieth-century France. In Sex, knowledge, and receptions of the past. Oxford University Press.
- Cryle, P., & Moore, A. (2010). Frigidity at the fin-de-siècle: A slippery and capacious concept. Journal of the History of Sexuality.
