= Mary Gould (silversmith) =

British artist, silversmith

- Occupation: Silversmith

Mary Gould was an English silversmith.

Gould was the widow of candlestick maker James Gould, and registered a mark on 31 August 1747; at the time she was classified as a largeworker. She gave her address as the Golden Bottle in Ave Maria Lane. She signed herself "Mrs. James Gould", and used his mark in her work.

A pair of George II silver-gilt candlesticks by Gould, dating to 1747, are owned by the National Museum of Women in the Arts.
