= Clerical Guide or Ecclesiastical Directory =

The Clerical Guide or Ecclesiastical Directory was the earliest ever specialist directory to cover the clergy of the Church of England. In its initial format it appeared just four times – in 1817, 1822, 1829 and 1836, under the editorial direction of Richard Gilbert.

Another edition was actually advertised for 1838, but no copies have in fact been found within the main academic libraries.

The title was briefly revived by Thomas Bosworth & Company during the 1880s.

== Contents of the Clerical Guide ==
The main alphabetical section of the directory included:

- A list of benefices together with their populations, counties, dioceses and archdeaconries
- Their incumbents with the year of his institution
- Their values (up to the 1829 edition) in the Valor Ecclesiasticus or King's Books
- The names of their patrons.
- The 1836 edition additionally gave the income of the benefice during the year 1831, the available capacity or "church room" for the congregation, and the name of any impropriator.

The preliminary pages included:

- Current lists of bishops, members of cathedral chapter, and other dignitaries, showing the values of their First Fruits
- A section on the Doctors of Laws, the canonical specialists
- A section on the Chapel Royal together with the king's preachers and chaplains
- Sections on Sion College and Gresham College
- Sections on the two English universities (Oxford and Cambridge)
- Sections on the fellows and schoolmasters of Eton, Winchester, Westminster, Harrow, Manchester and St Paul's.

The alphabetical list of benefices was also followed by an alphabetical list of the prelates, dignitaries and beneficed clergy of the Church of England (generally omitting the unbeneficed clergy).

The directories concluded with lists of ecclesiastical patronage, giving the names of those benefices within the gift of the king and also those of the lord chancellor, the chancellor of the duchy of Lancaster, the various archbishops and bishops, and the two universities.

== The publishers ==
The 1817 edition stated that it was "printed for J. C. & F. Rivington, 62 St Paul's Churchyard, by R. & R. Gilbert, St John's Square, Clerkenwell". Richard Gilbert was a printer and an accountant with the SPCK. Although he appeared in the 1817 edition merely as the "printer" (alongside his brother Robert, who died the following year), he thereafter seems to have taken a more prominent role in its production. The 1822 edition was "corrected by Richard Gilbert", as though he had been engaged in putting right someone else's mistakes. He similarly wrote the prefaces for subsequent editions, and the 1836 edition still bore the names "Gilbert and Rivington, printers, St John's Square".

Gilbert, an industrious compiler who was additionally very active in the religious life of Clerkenwell, also produced a pocket-sized Clergyman's Almanack in 1819

== The Clerical Guide after 1836 ==
The failure of the directory to appear after 1836 left open an opportunity for a rival publication. This was filled after 1841 by the Clergy List.

After lying dormant for fifty years, the title Clerical Guide and Ecclesiastical Directory was briefly revived in 1886 by Thomas Bosworth & Company, 65 Great Russell Street. Once again the volume offered alternative listings of the clergy and the benefices, together with other "valuable information … from the office of the Ecclesiastical Commission. However the relaunched title was very quickly acquired by Hamilton Adams of Paternoster Row, who in 1889 merged it with their other recent acquisition, the aforementioned Clergy List.

In the issue for 1918/19 the Clergy List was merged in its turn with Crockford's Clerical Directory. Thereafter until the 1930s the latter title still continued to advertise on its preliminary pages that it "incorporated the Clergy List", together with the Clerical Guide and Ecclesiastical Directory.

A microfiche version of the 1829 directory was produced during the 1980s by the Society of Genealogists. In more recent years scanned copies of the early editions have also appeared on the World Wide Web.

== See also ==
- Clergy of the Church of England database
