= The Parliament Magazine =

Magazine covering politics from the European Union

- Frequency: Monthly
- Publisher: Dods
- Founded: 1995
- Country: Belgium
- Based in: Brussels
- Language: English
- Website: http://www.theparliamentmagazine.eu

The Parliament Magazine is a monthly EU politics, policy and culture magazine. Its website, www.theparliamentmagazine.eu, is a forum for discussion on the latest developments in EU politics and policy, featuring regular contributions from prominent European policymakers, the magazine's editorial team and freelance journalists.

== History and profile ==
The Parliament Magazine was founded in 1995. The magazine is owned by Dods, a British company that provides contact and biographical information about the Houses of Parliament and the Civil Service since 1832. It is one of the oldest political publishing houses in the world, and has produced essential publications for over 174 years. They also publish Dod's Parliamentary Companion.

The Parliament Magazine is based in Brussels, Belgium. It is published on a monthly basis as of September 2021, having previously been produced on a fortnightly basis.

== Contributors and editorial agenda ==
The magazine is based upon contributions—both editorial and advertorial—from sitting members of parliament, NGOs, pressure and interest groups on issues currently under discussion within the European institutions. In the last parliamentary session, more than 200 members of the European Parliament and 19 of the 27 European Commissioners wrote specifically for the magazine, providing in-depth policy coverage and analysis. The Managing editor was Brian Johnson, who also oversaw the publication of www.theparliamentmagazine.eu.

Special feature editions included Green Week, Employment Week, the OECD Forum as well as in-depth EU Presidency supplements.

== Readership and distribution ==
European Parliament

- All MEPs
- All Secretaries-General and senior press
- Officers of the nine political groups

EU President and Presidency officials

- Council of Ministers
- Senior officials in the General Secretariat of the Council

European Commission

- All EU Commissioners, Chefs de Cabinet and officials with responsibility for parliamentary relations

Economic and Social Committee

- All members in Brussels

Committee of the Regions

- Brussels secretariat

European Court of Justice

- Senior officials

European Investment Bank

- Senior officials

== Sister publications ==
=== Regional Review ===
The Regional Review was a sister publication to The Parliament Magazine that focuses on news and analysis of regional policy legislation and developments at EU, national and regional levels. It has been described as "unique on the EU publishing scene".

=== Research Review ===
Published every quarter, the Research Review focused on research news and analysis across the EU.

== Awards and events ==
=== The MEP Awards ===
The Parliament Magazine organises the annual MEP Awards, a ceremony to highlight the work of MEPs across various policy areas. Former Commission Vice-President Margot Wallström has hailed the event as highlighting the European Parliament's work. Winners at past awards included prominent MEPs such as Paul Rübig, Jo Leinen, Malcolm Harbour and Eva-Britt Svensson, as well as a nomination for Liz Lynne for her work to advance the rights of blind people.

=== The EPA Awards ===
Analogous to the MEP Awards, the European Public Affairs (EPA) Awards aimed to highlight the work of outstanding Public Affairs professionals across Europe. Judges at the 2010 awards included a number of senior professionals from influential organisations.

=== Events ===
The Parliament Magazine regularly organises roundtables, conferences, debates and receptions on a range of topics.
