= William Lipscomb (disambiguation) =

William Lipscomb was a Nobel Prize-winning American chemist.

William Lipscomb may also refer to:

- William Lipscomb (clergyman) (1829–1908), preacher of the Restoration Movement and associate of Tolbert Fanning
- William Lipscomb (writer), English clergyman, translator and poet
- William Lipscomb (cricketer), English barrister and cricketer
- W. P. Lipscomb (William Percy Lipscomb), British-born Hollywood playwright, screenwriter, producer and director
