= Ronald Fleming =

Ronald Fleming may refer to:

- Ronald Fleming (interior decorator) (1896–1968), English interior decorator
- Ronald Lee Fleming, American urban planner
- Ron Fleming (1937–2021), also known as Ronald Franklin Fleming, American woodturning artist
