= The Cambridge Guide to the Arts in Britain =

The Cambridge Guide to the Arts in Britain Vol. 1.

The Cambridge Guide to the Arts in Britain, later republished as The Cambridge Cultural History of Britain, is a guide to the arts in Britain from Prehistory to the post Second World War period. It was edited by Boris Ford and published in nine volumes by Cambridge University Press between 1988 and 1991.

== The Guide ==
The Cambridge Guide to the Arts in Britain, is a guide to the arts in Britain from Prehistory to the post Second World War period. It was edited by Boris Ford and published in nine volumes by Cambridge University Press between 1988 and 1991.

Ford was a graduate of Cambridge University and had been Education Secretary to the Cambridge University Press in 1957–58. He had experience of editing large multi-volume works, having previously edited the Pelican Guide to English Literature in seven volumes (1954–61), and the new edition of that guide issued from 1982 to 1988.

The guide was an ambitious attempt to give a picture of the arts as a whole in each age of Britain and to allow comparison between the ages and of how the different arts had treated the themes of their age. Ford wrote in his general introduction to the series that "the degree to which the individual arts have flourished are not fortuitous, but are bound up with the social aspirations and characteristics of the age, with its beliefs and preoccupations and manners, which may favour expression in one art rather than another."

Each volume of the guide takes the form of an introduction by Ford followed by essays on each branch of the arts by other contributors and finally an extensive bibliography.

== Publishing history ==
In 1992, the series was republished in paperback as The Cambridge Cultural History of Britain with revised titles that made each volume more suitable for sale on its own. A hardback edition of the cultural history was also produced by CUP and sold through The Folio Society.

== Volumes ==
(Revised titles in brackets)

Vol. 1. Prehistoric, Roman and Early Medieval (Early Britain)

Vol. 2. The Middle Ages (Medieval Britain)

Vol. 3. Renaissance & Reformation (16th Century Britain)

Vol. 4. The Seventeenth Century (17th Century Britain)

Vol. 5. The Augustan Age (18th Century Britain)

Vol. 6. Romantics to Early Victorians (The Romantic Age in Britain)

Vol. 7. The Later Victorian Age (Victorian Britain)

Vol. 8. The Edwardian Age and the Inter-War Years (Early 20th Century Britain)

Vol. 9. Since the Second World War (Modern Britain)
