= Charles Dod =

Irish journalist and writer (1793–1855)

Charles Roger Phipps Dod (or Dodd) (1793–1855) was an Irish journalist and writer, known for his reference works including the Parliamentary Companion. As of 2021, this work is still published as Dod's Parliamentary Companion.

== Life ==
The only son of the Rev. Roger Dod, vicar of Drumlease, County Leitrim, by his second wife, Margaret, daughter of Matthew Phipps of Spurrtown, he was born at Drumlease 8 May 1793. He entered King's Inns, Dublin, 30 July 1816, with the intention of studying for the bar, but became a writer. Until 1847 he spelt his name Dodd, but after that time he resumed his proper name, Dod, as borne by his father and his ancestors, the Dods of Cloverley, Shropshire.

After having been part proprietor and editor of a provincial journal, Dod settled in London in 1818, where for 23 years he was connected with The Times. He took charge of the reports of parliamentary debates, managed reporters, and wrote obituaries to order. He succeeded John Tyas as the compiler of the summary of debates for The Times originated by Horace Twiss.

Dod died at 5 Foxley Road, North Brixton, Surrey, on 21 February 1855.

== Works ==
Dod wrote:

- The Parliamentary Pocket Companion, 1832, which became The Parliamentary Companion on its eleventh issue in 1843.
- The Peerage, Baronetage, and Knightage of Great Britain and Ireland, 1841.
- A Manual of Dignities, Privileges, and Precedence, 1842.
- The Annual Biography, being lives of eminent or remarkable persons who have died within the year 1842; only one volume appeared.
- Electoral Facts from 1832 to 1852, impartially stated, 1852, 2nd ed. 1853.

Dod's reputation was made by the Parliamentary Companion and the Peerage, Baronetage, and Knightage. The former, from the winter of 1832, included the first reformed parliament, and was updated at least annually; the latter appeared first in 1841, and was an annual.

Dod's Peerage, Baronetage, Knightage, of Great Britain and Ireland continued to release books into the 20th century including editions in 1872, 1908, 1915, 1919 was released in its 82nd year, and more book produced.

== Family ==
Dod married on 24 October 1814, Jane Eliza, eldest daughter of John Baldwin of Cork. Their only son was Robert Phipps Dod, who was educated at King's College, London, entered the 53rd Shropshire Regiment of militia, and served as a captain from 26 January 1855 to his death in 1865. He assisted his father in the compilation of The Parliamentary Companion and The Peerage, Baronetage, and Knightage, and took over the management of these works after 1843. Birth and Worth, an Enquiry into the Practical Use of a Pedigree, was printed by him in 1849 for presentation to his friends. He died at his residence, Nant Issa Hall, near Oswestry, Shropshire, 9 January 1865, from the effects of an accident while shooting in the previous December. He married, 9 February 1859, Catherine Emma, eldest daughter of the Rev. John Robert Nathaniel Kinchant.

== Notes ==
Attribution

This article incorporates text from a publication now in the public domain: Stephen, Leslie, ed. (1888). "Dod, Charles Roger Phipps". Dictionary of National Biography. Vol. 15. London: Smith, Elder & Co.
