= George Byrom Whittaker =

English bookseller and publisher

George Byrom Whittaker (1793–1847) was an English bookseller and publisher.

== Life ==
Born at Southampton in March 1793, he was the son of the Rev. George Whittaker, master of the grammar school. About 1814 he became a partner of Charles Law, wholesale bookseller in Ave Maria Lane, London, a house established by W. Bidwell Law (d. 1798). Whittaker brought capital and dynamism into the business. One enterprise was the publication of a translation of Georges Cuvier's Animal Kingdom, in sixteen volumes, with many coloured plates.

In 1824 he served as sheriff of London and Middlesex. He published for Frances Trollope, Colley Grattan, George Croly, and Mary Russell Mitford. The last novel of Sir Walter Scott came out with his imprint and his firm published in London all Scott's early collected editions. In conjunction with the Oxford, Cambridge and London booksellers and publishers, such Deighton, Bell, & Company and George Bell & Sons, he produced a series of Greek and Latin classics. John Payne Collier's edition of Shakespeare (1841) was issued by him. He published educational primers, including the Pinnock Catechisms series, and many other children's books, and he was a promoter of literacy with his Whittaker's Popular Library (Popular Library of Modern Authors).

The British publisher, Joseph Whitaker (1820–1895), who founded The Bookseller, a booktrade periodical, in 1858 and Whitaker's Almanack, a reference annual, in 1869, and published under the name J. Whitaker & Sons, was not related to George Byrom Whittaker.

== Imprints ==
Whittaker published using a number of imprints:

- Whittaker & Co. (from c. 1820)
- G. B. Whittaker and Geo. B. Whittaker - based on his own name
- Law and Whittaker (c. 1814 - 1818) - jointly with the bookseller William Law
- G. and W. B. Whittaker (1818-1824) - jointly with his brother William Budd Whittaker
- Whittaker, Treacher, and Arnot - until 1835 with David Gale Arnot and until 1838 with Joseph Skipper Treacher

=== Personal life ===
He died at Kensington on 13 December 1847.

Richard Gilbert, founder of the printing firm of Gilbert & Rivington, married Whittaker's only sister; their son Robert succeeded to his uncle's property and business. The firm was incorporated as Gilbert and Rivington Ltd. in 1881, was still operating in the early twentieth century until it dissolved some time before 1916.

== Attribution ==
This article incorporates text from a publication now in the public domain: "Whittaker, George Byrom". Dictionary of National Biography. London: Smith, Elder & Co. 1885–1900.
