= Matthew Banckes =

English master carpenter

Matthew Banckes (died 1706) was an eminent English master carpenter, who was Master Carpenter in the royal Office of Works from 1683 and Master of the Worshipful Company of Carpenters from 1698. Banckes worked under Sir Christopher Wren at numerous projects, including six of Wren's City Churches, for which he supplied the carpentry, and at Trinity College Library, Cambridge, where he produced the elaborately trussed flooring that supported the weighty collection of books.

At Eton College he acted as surveyor and on occasion as architect. In 1693 the third Duke of Hamilton consulted him about Hamilton Palace. He rebuilt Petersham Lodge, at Petersham in Richmond, Surrey, for Laurence Hyde, 1st Earl of Rochester in 1791–2. He was the master carpenter at Winslow Hall, Winslow, Buckinghamshire, (1700) where he was probably working to Wren's designs.

His apprentice John James had a successful career as architect, having spent ten years in Banckes' employ. Bancks's son Henry was a stonemason by trade, with contracts at Blenheim Palace, Marlborough House, London, and Cannons.

His son Matthew was responsible for much of the carpentry at Blenheim, and for the centering of the arch of the Palladian Bridge there. His daughters' marriages are examples of the network of family ties at the top ranks of the building trades: to Charles Hopson, Master Joiner to the Office of Works, to John Churchill, master carpenter, and to Henry Wise, gardener, the partner of George London.
