= Amen Corner, London =

Street in the City of London, England

Coordinates: 51.51445°N 0.10090°W

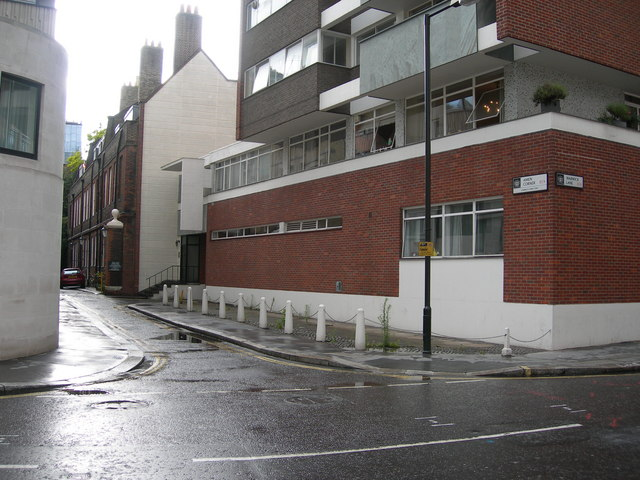
Amen Corner

Amen Corner is a street located off Ave Maria Lane, just to the west of St Paul's Cathedral and between the Old Bailey and Paternoster Square, in the City of London.

On the feast day of Corpus Christi, monks would say prayers in a Corpus Christi procession to St Paul's Cathedral. They set off from Paternoster Row chanting the Lord's Prayer (Pater noster... being the opening line in Latin). They would reach the final "amen" as they turned the corner in Ave Maria Lane, after which they would chant Hail Mary (Ave Maria in Latin).

The area was notable as the site of the Royal College of Physicians until it was destroyed by the Great Fire of London in 1666.

The modern Amen Corner is a stub of road that leads to Amen Court, home to a short terrace of 17th-century houses where the canons of the cathedral live. "Amen Court" is also the name of a tune by John Dykes Bower to the hymn "My spirit longs for Thee" by John Byrom.

The first meeting of the Campaign for Nuclear Disarmament was held in 1958 at the home of founder John Collins. Those present at the meeting included the Labour Party politicians Michael Foot and Denis Healey.

There is another Amen Corner in Tooting, south London, where the A217 road (Mitcham Road) meets Rectory Lane and Southcroft Road.

== See also ==
- Amen House
