= Holyrood (magazine) =

Scottish fortnightly political magazine

Holyrood is a fortnightly magazine devoted to current affairs and politics. Created following the advent of devolution in the UK in 1999 the magazine provides coverage of the goings on at the Scottish Parliament, as well as interviews with leading political figures. It is a politically independent publication. Holyrood Communications also has an event wing called Holyrood Events, which organises public sector events and conferences. The technology sub-brand, Holyrood Connect, provides events and the latest news, opinion and analysis on the technology sector across the UK.

== History ==
The magazine was originally owned by Parliamentary Communications, then in 2002 was bought out by Holyrood Communications. Dods acquired Holyrood Communications in 2012. Dods were hoping to benefit from the increased political activity that was expected in Scotland in the following two years. In December 2015, the Holyrood Communications staff moved into new premises at Panmure Court on Calton Road in Edinburgh.

Since 2021, the Scottish Green Party have not contributed to the Magazine. Editor Mandy Rhodes said Patrick Harvie sent her "a diatribe about how Holyrood magazine was part of a transphobic campaign and how much I was personally part of it." Rhodes said it was "truly astonishing" that anyone would think her a "bigot". When Harvie and his colleague Ross Greer said they could not vote for Kate Forbes as Deputy First Minister because of her opposition to gay marriage, Rhodes used the magazine to accuse them of "good old-fashioned misogynistic bullying cloaked with a veneer of so-called progressiveness tied up with a rainbow lanyard."

In 2022, the publication was acquired by Political Holdings, a UK-based media group as part of a £4.5m deal. The group, bankrolled by businessman and pollster Lord Ashcroft, includes a range of media, events and training operations.
