= Scrutiny (journal) =

UK literary periodical

Scrutiny: A Quarterly Review
- General editor: F. R. Leavis
- Categories: Literature
- Frequency: Quarterly
- Circulation: 1,500
- Publisher: Deighton, Bell, & Company
- First issue: May 1932
- Final issue Number: 1953; Vol 19
- Country: United Kingdom
- Based in: Cambridge
- Language: English

Scrutiny: A Quarterly Review was a literature periodical founded in 1932 by L. C. Knights and F. R. Leavis, who remained its principal editor until the final issue in 1953. Other editors included D. W. Harding and Harold Andrew Mason.

An additional volume, number 20, is often included in this series, including "A Retrospect" by Leavis, indexes, and errata.

== Background ==
Literary critic and historian Boris Ford has stated that it was L. C. Knights "who had the idea of creating such a literary quarterly, and took steps to bring it into being on 15 May 1932 - Knights's 26th birthday. Knights was the only one of Scrutiny's editors who served in that role for every one of its 76 issues." The first issue appeared early in May 1932, with 100 copies sold in the first week, with subscribers including T.S. Eliot, George Santayana, R. H. Tawney and Aldous Huxley. The circulation rose slowly, with 750 copies being printed later in the 1930s, and 1000 copies in the 1940s. At its height in the 1950s, Scrutiny only printed 1,500 copies, but most of these were held by colleges and academic libraries for circulation. As such, Scrutiny was widely read, and Leavis became very influential in 20th century literary criticism in part because he was editor of the journal.

After writing many articles for the journal, music critic Wilfrid Mellers appeared on the editorial board of the January 1942 issue, and continued in that position until the December 1948 issue. Besides its editorial staff, Scrutiny was able to have a contributing body of many important literary critics, including: Q.D. Leavis, Marius Bewley, William Empson, L.C. Knights, Michael Oakeshott, Herbert Read, I. A. Richards, George Santayana, Derek A. Traversi, and Martin Turnell. Some of the contributors to Scrutiny were also contributors to Left Review. Many contributors focused on the topics of education and politics, but, according to Richard Poirier, "its most important achievement was a nearly complete revaluation of English literature". That is not to say that they always supported these critics; according to John Grant, Scrutiny denounced "the later work of Empson and Richards" and disregarded "critics in the colonies such as Blackmur, Burke, and Frye".

== Critical response ==
Poirier claims that "Scrutiny had earned more respect and more denunciation than any other quarterly in English". Grant, in responding to Poirier's review of Scrutiny, found that "Scrutiny specialized in being right—half the time. In order to praise, it felt compelled also to damn, and then found it easy to do so because it possessed "standards" against which all works could be judged."

Poet Geoffrey Grigson took issue with Scrutiny in an editorial in Grigson’s magazine New Verse in July 1933. In the editorial, Grigson acknowledged that Leavis and the other writers for Scrutiny were “sincere”, but added “sincerity by itself is not a very useful thing.” Grigson criticised Scrutiny for its repeated disparagements of the work of W. H. Auden and Stephen Spender, and claimed that the journal was uninterested in modern British poetry. Grigson added: "Scrutiny, if Dr. Leavis wants some plain criticism, is too adolescent, too self-righteous...If Scrutiny is not to be the perfect body-builder for prigs it must change its formula."

There were other detractors, including T. S. Eliot; "'I so strongly disagreed with Dr. Leavis during the last days of [Scrutiny],' Eliot wrote, 'and objected to his attacks and innuendoes about people I knew and respected. I think it is a pity he became so intemperate in his views and was extravagant in his admirations, as I had, in the earlier stages of the magazine, felt great sympathy for its editor.'"

== Collections ==
Articles from Scrutiny have been separately republished in collections.

- Bentley, Eric, ed. (1948). The Importance of Scrutiny: Selections from Scrutiny, A Quarterly Review, 1932-1948. New York: George W. Stewart. OCLC 191065639. Archived from the original on October 26, 2012 – via Questia..
- Leavis, F. R., ed. (1968). A Selection from Scrutiny. Cambridge: Cambridge University Press. ISBN 978-0-521-09509-9..
  - Review: David Lodge (April 1970). "A Selection from 'Scrutiny' by F. R. Leavis". The Modern Language Review. 65 (2): 414–415. doi:10.2307/3723582. JSTOR 3723582.

== Reprints ==
In 1963, the entire publication was reprinted in 20 bound volumes from photographic copies by the Cambridge University Press.
