= Libertine Enlightenment =

2003 book edited by Lisa O'Connell and Peter Cryle

Libertine Enlightenment: Sex, Liberty and Licence in the Eighteenth Century
- Cover of the first edition
- Editor: Peter Cryle; Lisa O'Connell
- Language: English
- Subject: Literary criticism
- Publisher: Palgrave Macmillan
- Publication date: 2003
- Publication place: United States
- Media type: Print
- ISBN: 1-4039-1763-9

Libertine Enlightenment: Sex, Liberty and Licence in the Eighteenth Century is a 2003 book edited by Peter Cryle and Lisa O'Connell.

== Overview ==
Libertine Enlightenment is a multi-author collection of essays covering several aspects of libertine thought as it developed during the Enlightenment, including sexual liberty, personal liberty, and political liberty. The book contains the following sections and essays:

Part I. Disquieting Theories

1. "Taking Liberties: Sterne, Wilkes and Warburton" by Simon During
2. "Casanova: Inscriptions of Forgetting" by Chantal Thomas
3. "Codified Indulgence: The Niceties of Libertine Ethics in Casanova and His Contemporaries" by Peter Cryle
4. "Kant, Sade and the Libertine Enlightenment" by Alan Corkhill
5. "Philosophical Liberty, Sexual Licence: The Ambiguity of Voltaire's Libertinage" by Serge Rivière

Part II. Improper Women

6. "The Female Rake: Gender, Libertinism and Enlightenment" by Kathleen Wilson
7. "The Making of a Libertine Queen: Jeanne de La Motte and Marie-Antoinette" by Iain McCalman
8. "Secrecy and Enlightenment: Delarivier Manley's New Atlantis" by Nicola Parsons
9. "Authorship and Libertine Celebrity: Harriette Wilson's Regency Memoirs" by Lisa O'Connell

Part III. Spurious Practices

10. "Libertines and Radicals in the 1790s: The Strange Case of Charles Pigott I" by Jonathan Mee
11. "James Graham as Spiritual Libertine" by Peter Otto
12. "The Mysteries of Imposture: Count Cagliostro's Literary Legacy in German Romanticism" by Christa Knellwolf
13. "Children of the Midnight Mass" by Patrick Wald Lasowski

== Reception ==
James Grantham Turner, reviewing the book for the Journal of the History of Sexuality, described Libertine Enlightenment as "a star-studded collection in the sense that it provides small but intense points of light, case studies rather than large definitions or broad syntheses." Turner went on to say, "[t]he main focus of many essays here is not sexuality but sexualization—a kind of automatic assumption that any free-thinker or skeptic must be wildly experimental in sexual matters." Turner concluded: "these essays bring Enlightenment to life as a complicated phenomenon, contradictory, even slovenly, but still vital. I find this timely."

Michael McKeon, writing in Studies in English Literature praised the book for its eclectic approach: "Libertine Enlightenment ... mixes methods of criticism, moving back and forth between theoretical synthesis, textual analysis, and biographical story-telling, the latter two predominating. What unites these styles of procedure is a fairly common thickness of circumstantial detail, briefly immersing the reader in a world and a demimonde that seem only rather more strange than they do familiar McKeon went on to say:

Cryle and O'Connell's aim is to get away from the focus less on thinkers than on conventionally 'great' thinkers, and in sympathy with this aim they also would replace the idea of the 'Enlightenment' by the idea of 'multiple enlightenments.' However, this endorsement of the multiple over the monolithic is quickly qualified by the further thought that 'libertine enlightenment(s?)' might do as well as any single term to capture the totality, so long as we understand that 'libertinism—the self-aware, philosophically oriented practice of more or less sexualized freedom—merges into libertinage—the vernacular, dissident freedoms of everyday life.'

Adam Rounce in The Cambridge Quarterly commented on the misleading title of the book: "this essay collection inverts the old-fashioned idea of hiding erotica under a dull and pious title, so that politics and liberty get equal attention with sex." Rounce did offer qualified praise for the book, stating that despite its unevenness, "the best parts ... would stand very well on their own, while some of the others would benefit from less rigidity."

Kevin L. Cope, writing in Eighteenth-Century Life, reviewed Libertine Enlightenment alongside Sophie Carter's Purchasing Power: Representing Prostitution in Eighteenth-Century English Popular Print Culture and Frances Ferguson's Pornography, the Theory. Cope called Libertine Enlightenment "most ambitious and successful of the three ... Libertine Enlightenment ... expands the standard concept of the place of Enlightenment."

However, Cope found Libertine Enlightenment, as well as the two other books under review, diminished by a certain timidity in addressing their topics: "All three of these books suffer from a pervasive nervousness, whether a highly professional concern to please the aging power-brokers of our profession or a quiet tension about taking up the tawdry side of life as one’s topic in a 'tenure' book or an affected trembling about the injustices of sex in the exploitative city or some other form of hypertrophic worry. These books remind readers that the long eighteenth century may well be larger than our wits (or our lusts) and that its seeming preoccupation with sexuality may only symptomatize its vivacity."

== See also ==
- Libertine novel

== Sources ==
- Cope, Kevin L. (Winter 2009). "Pious Times and Priestcraft Begin Again: The Upright Sexuality of the Enlightenment (Review of Libertine Enlightenment)". Eighteenth-Century Life. 33 (1): 9–18. doi:10.1215/00982601-2008-018. ISSN 0098-2601. S2CID 141375067.
- Cryle, Peter; O'Connell, Lisa, eds. (2003). Libertine Enlightenment: Sex, Liberty and Licence in the Eighteenth Century. Palgrave MacMillan. ISBN 1-4039-1763-9.
- McKeon, Michael (Summer 2005). "Recent Studies in the Restoration and Eighteenth Century (review of Libertine Enlightenment: Sex, Liberty, and License in the Eighteenth Century by Peter Cryle and Lisa O'Connell)". SEL: Studies in English Literature 1500–1900. 45 (3): 707–771. doi:10.1353/sel.2005.0030. JSTOR 3844609. S2CID 17732487.
- Rounce, Adam (2006). "The Joy of Sex (review of The Yard of Wit: Male Creativity and Sexuality, 1650-1750 by Raymond Stephanson; Libertine Enlightenment: Sex, Liberty and Licence in the Eighteenth Century by Peter Cryle and Lisa O'Connell)". The Cambridge Quarterly. 35 (2): 192–196. doi:10.1093/camqtly/bfl004. JSTOR 42967324.
- Turner, James Grantham (January–April 2005). "Review of Libertine Enlightenment: Sex, Liberty, and License in the Eighteenth Century by Peter Cryle and Lisa O'Connell". Journal of the History of Sexuality. 14 (1/2): 206–210. doi:10.1353/sex.2006.0017. JSTOR 3844609. S2CID 145138703.
