= Gareth Bennett (priest) =

British priest and academic

Gareth Vaughan Bennett, also known as Garry Bennett (8 November 1929 – 7 December 1987), was a British Anglican priest and academic who committed suicide in the wake of media reactions to an anonymous preface he wrote for Crockford's Clerical Directory.

== Life ==
Bennett was born at Westcliff-on-Sea, Essex into a "lower-middle-class family", son of Roy Charles Frederick Bennett and Kathleen Beryl (née Vaughan). Bennett's father was a London shipping clerk. Bennett was educated at the Royal Grammar School, Guildford, Southend High School for Boys and Christ's College, Cambridge. He trained for ordination at Westcott House, Cambridge, and was ordained deacon in 1956 and priest in 1957. He served his title at St Mary the Virgin, Prittlewell (1956–1959). He also became a published historian, Fellow in Modern History at New College, Oxford and college chaplain and Dean of Divinity, canon of Chichester Cathedral and a member of the Church of England's General Synod and its standing committee. He was a well-known figure in ecclesiastical politics in England, latterly rather definedly on the conservative wing of the Anglo-Catholic movement, being a noted figure in the opposition to the ordination of women.

Crockford's Clerical Directory, published biennially by the Church of England, contains brief biographical details of every Anglican cleric in Britain and Ireland. It was traditional for its preface to be written anonymously and to take a slightly waspish, if detached and amused, look at events in the church since the previous edition. Bennett was asked to write the preface for the 1988 edition of the directory, which was published on 3 December 1987.

Bennett consciously took a different tack on the article and, from a conservative viewpoint, wrote a carefully constructed demolition of the hierarchy of the Church of England, which he himself described as "wicked". In it Bennett excoriated what he perceived as an intolerant liberal elite in the church, headed by the Archbishop of Canterbury, Robert Runcie, a process which he felt would follow a trail already blazed by the Episcopal Church in the United States of America and would lead inexorably to a steep decline in the fortunes of the church. Specifically, he argued that Runcie was guilty of cronyism, appointing to high office only those whom he had known through Westcott House (Bennett's own theological college) or Ripon College Cuddesdon theological colleges or else the Canterbury and St Albans dioceses.

While the explosive nature of the article in ecclesiastical circles might have been predicted, the secular press turned the issue into front-page news. The papers latched on to his criticisms of Runcie, yet the preface was far more critical of the liberal Bishop of Durham, David Jenkins, and the Bishop of Newark, John Shelby Spong. After a number of days of fevered speculation, it emerged that Bennett was the anonymous author and the last entries in his diary make clear that he was finding the attentions of the tabloid press increasingly difficult to cope with.

Between 5 December 1987, when he was last seen alive, and 7 December, when his body was found, Bennett killed himself at 15, Moody Road, Oxford. His death and the events which led up to it continue to divide those who take an interest in church matters. Conservative Anglo-Catholics and many others opposed to the ordination of women view Bennett as a martyr, hounded to his death by the machinations of the Church of England "spin machine" for saying something that everyone believed to be true. Liberals, while agreeing that his death was a tragedy, point to Bennett being not without his problems and having recently lost his mother, to whom he was particularly close.

== Evaluation ==
Bennett's Crockford preface came at a time when the issue of the ordination of women to the priesthood was becoming a more divisive issue in the Church of England than it had perhaps been up to that point. The main book on the Bennett affair, William Oddie's The Crockford Files, highlights this as a primary frustration for Bennett but also considers other factors, such as the gradual emergence after the 1960s of trends – for example the non-realist theology of Don Cupitt – which traditionalists considered detrimental to the faith of the church. Bennett aligned himself to the Anglo-Catholic wing of the church and had strong links with Pusey House, Oxford, and the clergy who staffed it and made that alignment consciously and "not without reservations". At the time Bennett wrote his preface (which covers a wider range of topics than the disproportionate amount of coverage given to the "An Archbishop in toils" section suggests), opposition to the ordination of women to the priesthood had not been centralised – the traditionalist group Forward in Faith did not become established until 1992. It is, therefore, a matter of conjecture how he would have moved had he been alive when the Church of England voted positively on the issue and the first ordination of women as priests took place in England in 1994.

For all the polarisation between them that the media reports suggested, Bennett and Robert Runcie knew each other and Bennett was one of a number of clergy and lay people whose skills Runcie, when at Canterbury, used in drafting speeches and sermons, as Runcie's main biographer, Humphrey Carpenter, indicates. Carpenter, working from Bennett's diaries, noted that Bennett had become frustrated at his lack of preferment and this may have contributed to the tone of his preface. Runcie himself said of Bennett that there was nothing in what he wrote which he had not previously "said to his face". From Carpenter's portrait, Bennett emerges on the one hand as a distinguished academic and cleric, but on the other as a reclusive lonely man who could not cope with the spotlight when it fell upon him.

== Writings ==
- Essays in Modern English Church History in Memory of Norman Sykes. Published by Adam & Charles Black, 1966. Edited by Bennett and J. D. Walsh.
- To the Church of England. Churchman Publishing Ltd., 1988. ISBN 1850931100
- The Tory Crisis in Church and State 1688–1730: The Career of Francis Atterbury Bishop of Rochester. Oxford: Clarendon Press, 1975. xvii, 335 p., [5] leaves of plates: ill.; 23 cm. ISBN 0198224443
- Tradition and Change in the Church. London [England]: Association for the Apostolic Ministry, [1988?]. [8] p. ; 21 cm. "This Report was authorised for publication by AAM by the late Canon Gareth Bennett..."
- White Kennett 1660–1728, Bishop of Peterborough: A Study in the Political and Ecclesiastical History of the Early Eighteenth Century. London : S.P.C.K. for the Church Historical Society, 1957. xii, 290 p.

== Sources ==
- By Sex Divided: Church of England and Women Priests, Jonathan Petre, Zondervan, 1995. ISBN 9780006278160
- That Fateful Preface, New Directions, January 2006.
- An Unhappy Anniversary, New Directions, December 1997.
