= Merit Group =

British publishing company

Merit Group plc
- Formerly: Huveaux plc and Dods Group plc
- Type: Public limited company
- Traded as: AIM: MRIT
- Industry: Publishing
- Founded: 2001
- Headquarters: The Shard, London SE1
- Area served: United Kingdom; Germany; France
- Key people: Munira Ibrahim, MD, Dods Intelligence; Cornelius Conlon, MD, Merit Data and Technology
- Brands: Dods
- Revenue: ▼UK£ 24.7 million (to 31 March 2021)
- Owner: Lord Michael Ashcroft (42%)
- Number of employees: ▲1,158 (2021)
- Website: meritgroupplc.com

Merit Group plc is a British publishing holding company founded in 2001. Its largest shareholder is the Conservative politician and businessman Lord Ashcroft. It was formerly known as Huveaux plc (from 2001 to 2010) and then as Dods Group plc (2010–2021).

Its ordinary shares are listed on the Alternative Investment Market of the London Stock Exchange.

== Subsidiaries ==
A subsidiary, Dods Parliamentary Communications Ltd, publishes The House Magazine, a fortnightly publication for peers and MPs in Westminster; the annual Dod's Parliamentary Companion; and The Parliament Magazine, aimed at Members of the European Parliament. Publication of Dods Parliamentary Companion began in 1832.

In 2011, the company bought the PoliticsHome website from Lord Ashcroft for £2m. PoliticsHome had been founded in 2008 as a sister site to ConservativeHome and was then edited by Paul Waugh.

In 2012, it bought Biteback Media Ltd, publisher of Total Politics, for £795,000 in cash, and Holyrood Communications, publisher of Holyrood, for £416,806 cash plus a further £250,000 if profit targets are met.

As of March 2022, Politics Home and The House Magazine had a combined one million monthly readers online.
