= House sign =

Sign used to identify a house

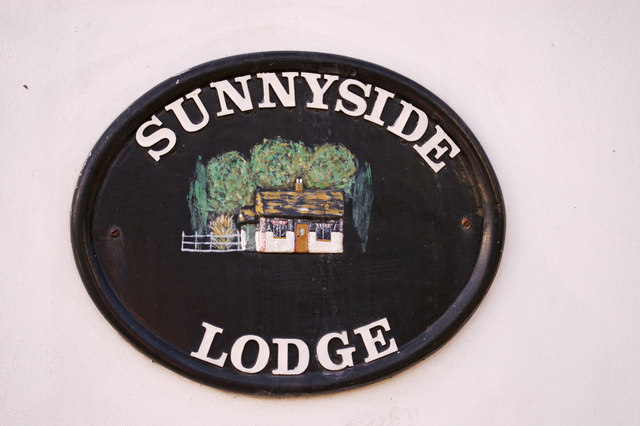
"Sunnyside Lodge" house name plaque

House signs have been used since ancient times to personalise a dwelling.

== See also ==
- House number sign
- Paternoster Row (London)
