= Geoffrey Houghton-Brown =

Geoffrey Alban Michael Houghton Brown (12 April 1903 - 3 February 1993) was an artist and connoisseur.

== Biography ==
Geoffrey Alban Michael Houghton Brown was born in Wimbledon on 12 April 1903.

During World War II, considered unfit for service, he volunteered to extinguish fires following the bombings on the roof of Westminster Abbey.

In 1947 he bought Winslow Hall, a Grade I building that was under threat of demolition. It became an antiques showroom, and was sold again in 1959. Other than Winslow Hall, he owned Clouds House, Oving Hall, and Felix Hall.

Other than collector of 18th century furniture, Houghton Brown was a painter of religious pictures in the Byzantine- Cubist style and had a studio in Tottenham Court Road. He was friend, and follower, of Roy de Maistre. He exhibited at the Ebury Street gallery, "Sacred Abstract Art".

He edited an apologia of Nostradamus.

He was also friends with Father Martin D'Arcy, Oliver Messel and James Lees-Milne. His lifelong companion was Ronald Fleming (1896 - 1968).

Geoffrey Houghton-Brown died in Kingston upon Thames on 3 February 1993.
