= Harold Andrew Mason =

English academic (1911-1993)

Dr Harold Andrew Mason
- Born: 30 July 1911; Hull, England, United Kingdom
- Died: 25 November 1993 (aged 82); Cambridge, England, United Kingdom
- Occupations: Academic, literary critic
- Spouse: Eve Mason (nee Vest)
- Children: Thomas, John, Charles

Academic background
- Education: Hull Grammar School; Christ's Hospital
- Alma mater: University College, Hull; Oriel College, Oxford

Academic work
- Institutions: Downing College, Cambridge; University of Exeter; Clare Hall, Cambridge
- Notable works: Contributions to Scrutiny; The Cambridge Quarterly

Harold Andrew Mason (30 July 1911 – 25 November 1993) was a lecturer of English at Exeter University.

== Life ==
He was born in Hull, England in 1911. He was educated at Hull Grammar School, Christ's Hospital, Hull University College and Oriel College, Oxford. He graduated from Oxford in 1934. He became a teacher of Classics at Stamford School.

In 1937, Mason began teaching Classics at a school in Switzerland and also started contributing to Scrutiny. He got married in 1945. In 1949, he was Assistant Director of Studies in English at Downing College, Cambridge. He was an editor of Scrutiny from 1949 until it ceased publication in 1953. From 1955 to 1965 he was a lecturer at Exeter University.

Mason was elected to F. R. Leavis Lectureship and a Fellow of Clare Hall in 1965. In 1966 he founded The Cambridge Quarterly, of which he was the editor.

Mason died in Cambridge in 1993.
