= Deighton, Bell, & Company =

Defunct British bookshop and publishing house

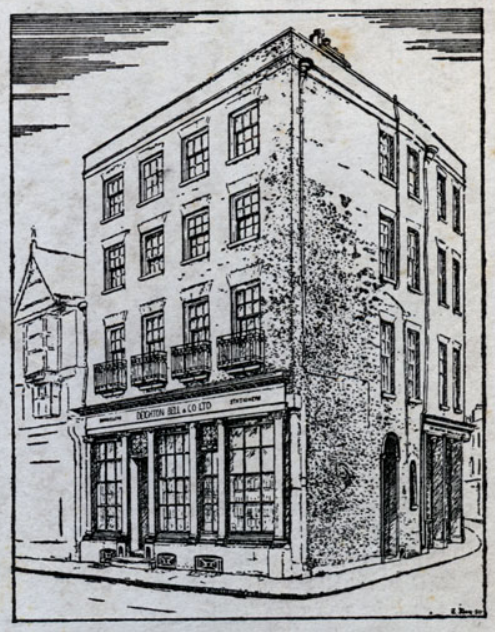
- Deighton, Bell, & Co., Cambridge, 1933
- Industry: Bookselling, publishing
- Founded: 1778
- Founder: John Deighton
- Headquarters: United Kingdom
- Number of locations: 1

Deighton, Bell, & Company was a British firm of booksellers and publishers located in Cambridge, England. It enjoyed a long and close association with the University of Cambridge. In 1978 it celebrated two centuries in the book business and, along with two other booksellers Heffers and Bowes & Bowes, the firm contributed to "making Cambridge a prestigious centre of bookselling".

== Company history ==
The firm was founded in 1778 by John Deighton (1748–1828), a master bookbinder, and was located in "narrow, early eighteenth-century premises" at the corner of Green and Trinity Streets, Cambridge, which would be the location of the firm for its entire existence.

John Deighton became a major publisher for Cambridge University and a binder for that university's library. He also gained a reputation as a book retailer with a "remarkable ability to supply foreign books, even in time of war", which was particularly important to the university's library in that era before the introduction of the Uniform Penny Post throughout the United Kingdom and before the coming of the railways to all parts of the country.

Between 1813 and 1827 the firm was operated as a partnership between the founder and his two sons, John Deighton the younger (1791–1854) and Joseph Jonathan Deighton (1792–1848), trading as John Deighton & Sons. Following the elder John Deighton's retirement in 1827, the firm traded as J. & J. J. Deighton. Beginning in 1848, following Joseph's death, the firm traded as J. Deighton.

In 1854 the firm was acquired by the educational publisher George Bell of George Bell & Sons, following which it became known as Deighton, Bell, and Company.

In 1876 it was publishing, jointly with George Bell & Sons and Whittaker & Co., a number of textbook series for the secondary school and university markets.

During the twentieth century the firm concentrated mainly on bookselling of both new and secondhand books. While its publishing activities had mostly ceased, in 1932 the firm published and distributed F. R. Leavis's literary quarterly Scrutiny. From 1967 the firm devoted itself exclusively to antiquarian bookselling. In 1987 Deighton, Bell, and Co. was acquired by Heffers, which was in turn taken over by the academic book retailer and library supply service, Blackwell's.

== Book series ==
- Bibliotheca Classica
- Cambridge Greek and Latin Texts
- Cambridge School and College Text-books
- Cambridge Texts with Notes series
- Grammar-School Classics
- Luard Memorial Series
- Proceedings of the Cambridge Antiquarian Society
- Public School Series of Classical Authors
