= Boris Ford =

British literary critic, writer and editor

Richard Boris Ford (1 July 1917 – 19 May 1998) was a British literary critic, writer, editor and educationist.

== Early life ==
Ford was born on 1 July 1917, in Simla, India, the son of an Indian Army officer, Brigadier Geoffrey Noel Ford, and his Russian wife Ekaterina, Ford was a chorister at King's College, Cambridge, eventually becoming head chorister under Boris Ord. He was then educated at Gresham's School, and through his English master there, Denys Thompson, was introduced to F. R. Leavis under whom he studied at Downing College, Cambridge. Even before graduating, Ford's essay on Wuthering Heights was published by Leavis in Scrutiny in March 1939. Although he came to share many of Leavis's ideas, Ford could not follow Leavis in making "exclusion and exclusivity major features of [Leavis's] critical policy". Ford had an increasingly stormy relationship with Leavis and his wife Q. D.: at one point, Q. D. wrote to him "Mrs Leavis informs Mr Ford that he is no longer an acceptable visitor to her house. Any communications from him will not be answered."

== Career ==
After Cambridge, Ford joined the army, and from 1940 until the end of the Second World War was the officer commanding the Middle East School of Artistic Studies. He then became chief editor and director of the Army Bureau of Current Affairs (ABCA). So critical of Britain were ABCA's seminars addressed to officers and men that Ford attracted the attention of MI5. Indeed, Ford believed that the Labour Party came to power in 1945 as a result of ABCA's democratizing influence.

In 1951 Ford became information officer of UNESCO's technical assistance board. In 1953 he was invited by W. E. Williams, who had been a colleague at ABCA, to edit a multi-authored seven-volume Pelican Guide to English Literature (1954–61; revised, 1982–8). This was indebted in many senses to Leavis, who, when he closed Scrutiny in 1953, remarked bitterly that Ford had "approached my main people", and considered that some of the Pelican Guide essays were derivative. Nonetheless, the series broke new ground: notably the first volume, The Age of Chaucer, included a 200-page anthology of non-Chaucerian medieval poetry in original texts, so introducing early English poetry to several contemporary poets.

Ford became Associated Rediffusion's first head of schools broadcasting (1957–58), during which time he persuaded Benjamin Britten to compose his church opera Noye's Fludde for a series of programmes. However, Ford was dismissed before the opera was produced, on the grounds that Ford was "not suitable for the post". However, other accounts suggest that his dismissal came following his objection to the broadcast of unsuitable advertisements between programmes, and to the cancellation of school broadcasts to accommodate afternoon horse racing in the schedules.

In 1957–1958 Ford was education secretary to the Cambridge University Press. He then became professor of education and director of the Institute of Education at University of Sheffield from 1960 to 1963, when he became professor of education at Sussex University (1963–73). At Sussex, with the support of Asa Briggs, he helped establish a music department in 1971 with Donald Mitchell as visiting professor of music. While at Sussex, Ford was dean at the School of Cultural and Community Studies (1963–71). After leaving Sussex in 1973, Ford became professor of education at Bristol until 1982.

The Pelican Guide to English Literature series was followed by the even more ambitious The Cambridge Guide to the Arts in Britain (in nine volumes, 1988–91).

Ford died on 19 May 1998, in London, England.

== Family ==
He was married twice. With his first wife, Noreen, he had two daughters and a son, and was the step father to Noreen's daughter by her first marriage. He was the stepfather to the two daughters of his second wife, Inge.

== Publications ==
- A series edited by Boris Ford for Penguin Books, successively entitled: A Guide to English Literature, The Pelican Guide to English Literature, The New Pelican Guide to English Literature:
  - Vol. 1. The Age of Chaucer, 1945 ISBN 0-14-020290-0
    - Vol. 1. Medieval Literature: Chaucer and the alliterative tradition: with an anthology of Medieval poems and drama', updated edition 1982; 1990 ISBN 0-14-022272-3
  - Vol. 2. The Age of Shakespeare, 1969; 1991 ISBN 0-14-022265-0
  - Vol. 3. From Donne to Marvell, 1956; 1990 ISBN 0-14-022266-9
  - Vol. 4. From Dryden to Johnson, 1957 ISBN 0-14-022267-7
  - Vol. 5. From Blake to Byron, 1957; 5th ed. 1965 ISBN 0-14-020402-4
  - Vol. 6. From Dickens to Hardy, 1957 ISBN 0-14-022269-3.
  - Vol. 7. The Modern Age, From James to Eliot, 9th ed. 1964; 1990
  - Vol. 8. The Present: From Orwell to Naipaul
  - Vol. 9. American Literature
- Another series edited by Boris Ford for Cambridge University Press, successively entitled: The Cambridge Guide to the Arts in Britain and The Cambridge Cultural History of Britain:
  - Vol. 1. Early Britain, 1988
  - Vol. 2. Medieval Britain, 1988
  - Vol. 3. 16th Century Britain
  - Vol. 4. 17th Century Britain, 1992
  - Vol. 5. 18th Century Britain
  - Vol. 6. The Romantic Age in Britain, 1992
  - Vol. 7. Victorian Britain, 1990
  - Vol. 8. Early 20th Century Britain, 1992
  - Vol. 9. Modern Britain, 1992
- Benjamin Britten's Poets, 1994

== Editor of Journals ==
- 1951–1968 Co-editor of The Use of English with David Holbrook, Denys Thompson, and Raymond O'Malley
- 1955–1958 Editor of the Journal of Education
- 1955–1986 Editor of Universities Quarterly
