= Crockford's Clerical Directory =

Directory of the UK Anglican Communion

Crockford's Clerical Directory (Crockford) is the authoritative directory of Anglican clergy and churches in Great Britain and Ireland, containing details of English, Welsh, Scottish and Irish benefices and churches, and biographies of around 26,000 clergy in those countries as well as the Church of England Diocese in Europe in other countries. It was first issued in 1858 by John Crockford, a London printer and publisher.

Crockford is currently compiled and published for the Archbishops' Council by Church House Publishing. It covers in detail the whole of the Church of England (including the Diocese in Europe), the Church in Wales, the Scottish Episcopal Church, and the Church of Ireland, and it also gives some information – now more limited – about the world-wide Anglican Communion.

== Previous publishers ==
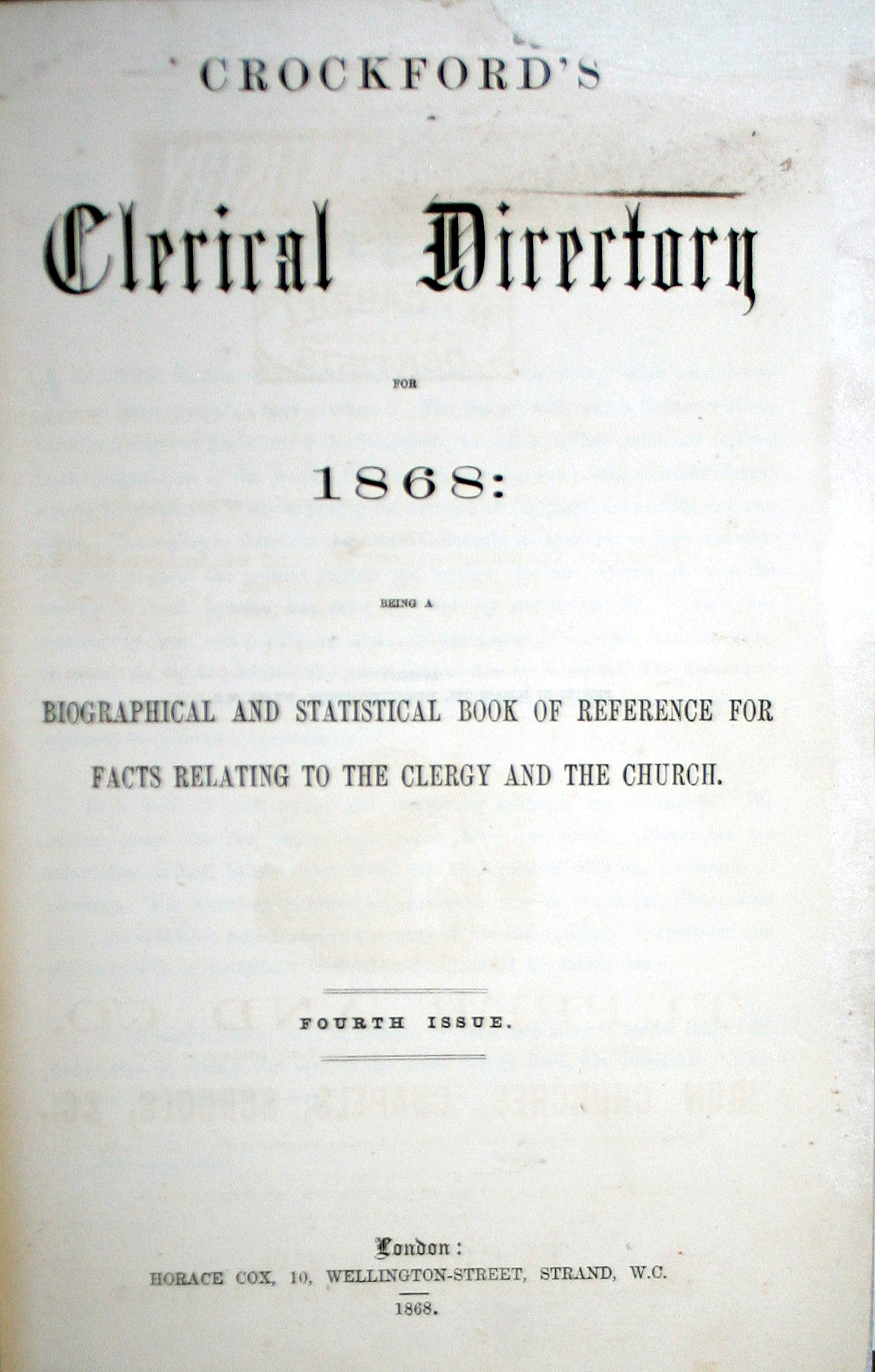
Crockford's Clerical Directory 1868, published by Horace Cox, London

The title of the first edition was simply The Clerical Directory, but a footnote showed that it was published by John Crockford, 29 Essex Street, the Strand. The original publisher died suddenly in 1865, shortly before the appearance of the third edition of what had by then become Crockford's Clerical Directory. For many subsequent issues the volumes were anonymously edited, but they were published under the imprint of Horace Cox – the nephew of John Crockford's closest business associate, solicitor and publisher Edward William Cox (1809Ω–1879). (His family was probably quite unrelated to the Charles Cox who coincidentally was the publisher of Crockford's chief rival, the Clergy List. (Note: A two-part article "Shop-talk and mordant wit" by Christopher Currie & Glyn Paflin describes the background to the directory's first hundred editions,)) Horace Cox died in 1918 (Note: Horace Cox's very brief obituary in The Times, 11 October 1918; p. 5, states that he had retired in 1912 and had ceased to take an active part in his business, which also produced The Field, The Queen and The Law Times) and the title was subsequently sold in 1921 to the Oxford University Press, who continued as publishers until the early 1980s. For the 1985/86 issue, publication was transferred to the Church Commissioners and their Central Board of Finance (who worked from their own administrative lists and databases). The publication is now collated by Church House Publishing.

== Frequency of publication ==
The first four issues came out in 1858, 1860 (with a supplement in 1861), (Note: The 1861 supplement, experimentally issued when a switch to biennial publication was being contemplated, may be downloaded free of charge from Google Play) 1865 (Note: The 1865 edition was reprinted in a 1995 facsimile limited edition of 100 copies by Peter Bell (bookseller), Edinburgh. It can also now be downloaded free of charge from Google play) and 1868. Crockford then reappeared biennially until 1876, when it began being published annually until 1917. The next issue was a delayed 1918/19 edition, which had for the first time incorporated its main rival publication, the Clergy List. Further issues appeared for 1920 and 1921/22; then between 1923 and 1927 (Note: There was no issue in 1928, for what the editor called "technical reasons". Production difficulties in 1941/42, 1943 and 1944 meant that it was only possible to issue short supplements to the 1941 edition. Crockford Prefaces: The Editor Looks Back (Oxford, 1947), pp. i, 257, 272, 283.) and 1929–1940 the directory reappeared annually, followed by more late issues in 1941 and 1947/48. Since that time Crockford has generally appeared every two years, although gradually worsening delays meant that the 87th and 88th editions were dated 1977/79 and 1980/82, and the book failed to appear at all during 1983/84. Biennial publication was once again resumed in 1985/86, although the volume issued late in 1997 was designated the 1998/99 edition. The 100th edition – eventually published for 2008/09 – included within its hardback version a few facsimile pages from the first edition, together with an extended historical note describing some of the earlier volumes.

The 1858 edition was later described as seemingly "assembled in a very haphazard fashion, with names added 'as fast as they could be obtained', out of alphabetical order and with an unreliable index". But nevertheless the 1860 directory "had become a very much more useful work of reference". (Note: Quoted by Brenda Hough in her biographical note on John Crockford, published in the 1998/99 Crockford and reprinted (with minor modifications) in all subsequent editions; also on the official Crockford's website.) However, the original volume was actually a consolidation of what in 1857 had been conceived as a mere series of supplements to an entirely different publication, the Clerical Journal. (Note: The Oxford Dictionary of National Biography article on Edward William Cox states that he, together with John Crockford, had founded the Clerical Journal in 1853.) The editors explained in the preface that they wished it to be understood that it was "but the foundation of a great work which, with the Cordial aid of the clergy, we shall hope to make more and more perfect every year".

== Scope of the directory ==
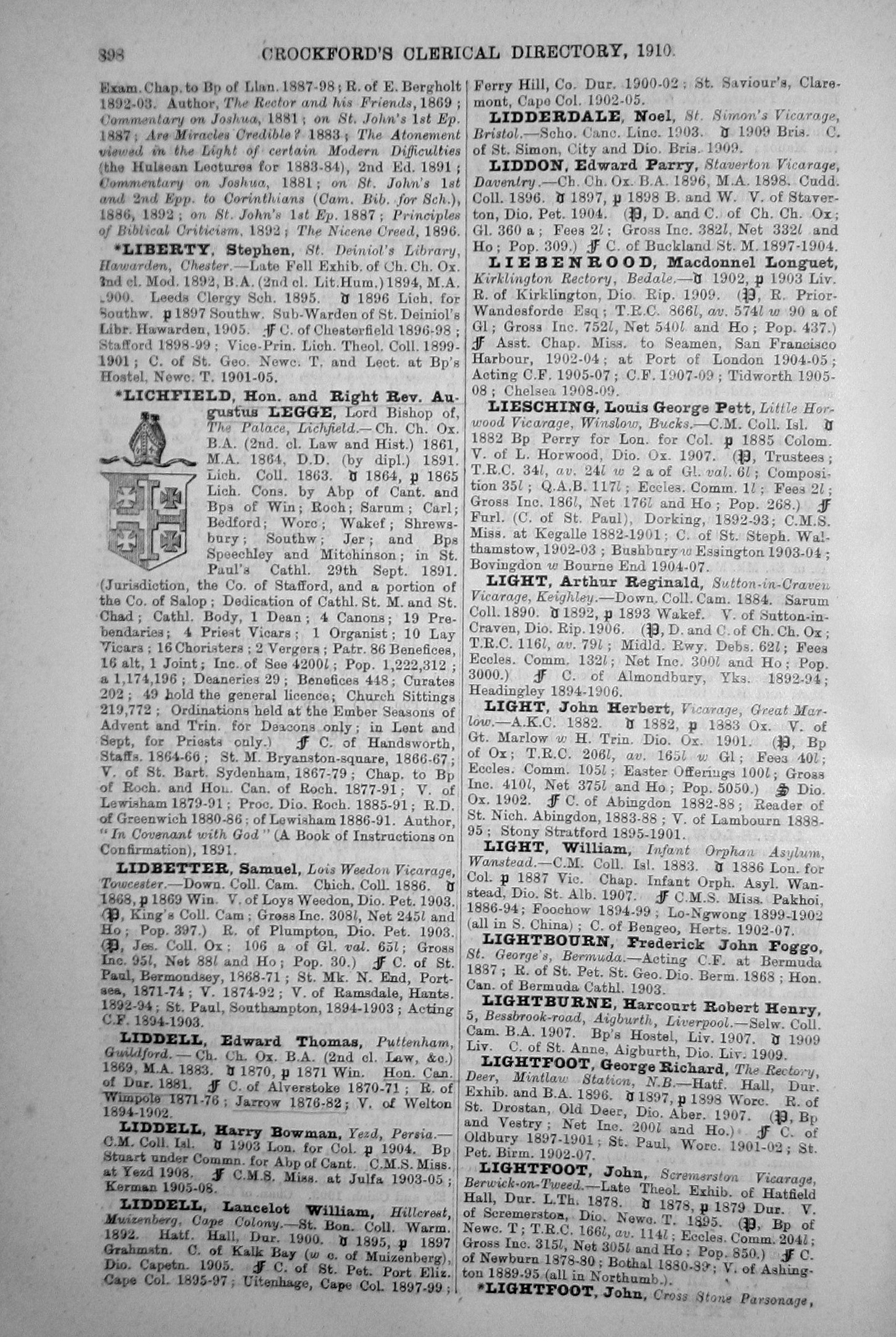
Crockford, 1910: a biographical page in an older edition would typically include many abbreviations, including clergy academic backgrounds, and their dates ordained deacon [d] and priest [p] (the presiding bishop being indicated). Diocesan coats of arms were shown alongside episcopal entries; any publications were listed, and parish incomes and patrons were mentioned. Many overseas clergy would be covered.

The 1858 issue was based on postal returns from the clergy in England and Wales, involving an outlay – as the preface pointed out – of "more than Five Hundred Pounds for Postage Stamps alone". Simpler lists for the Scottish Episcopal Church and for a number of colonial clergy – obtained from alternative sources – had been added by the 1865 edition, whilst details of Irish clergy had also been extracted from Alexander Thom's Irish Almanack and Official Directory. From the 1870s onwards the scope was progressively extended to all parts of the Anglican communion with the notable exception of the Episcopal Church (United States). The 1870 edition contained 940 pages, but this had increased to over 2,100 pages by 1892.

The earliest editions had also gradually added some details of diocesan office holders and administrators, together with the theological colleges, and the royal chapels. They also acquired much fuller indexes – along with outline maps of dioceses, and increasingly complete lists of bishops, dating right back to the earliest years of their sees. They further offered to all clergy an opportunity to list their publications, although these lists eventually had to be cut back as their overall length started to increase dramatically.

By the early 1980s severe economies had become necessary and 1985/86 edition had to be restricted to the "home" churches of England, Scotland and Wales. Retired clergy were temporarily restricted to just a few details of their final appointment, although it became possible to restore the Irish clergy in time for the 1987/88 edition. Later editions saw a further return of the retired clergy, together with details of those overseas clergy who had originally been licensed or trained in the UK, or who occupied senior positions within their respective church hierarchies. Details which had also become obtainable from the Church of England Yearbook or from similar sources were generally excluded. For a time too clergy who made their livings though secular jobs were excluded from the biographies section, with the abbreviation NQ (Non-Qualifying Position) being used to cover such periods when clerics returned to parish work and were again eligible for inclusion. In that many such clergy retained diocesan licences or episcopal "Permissions to Officiate" during their periods of secular employment, this approach may have caused a degree of difficulty for clerics who needed to prove their clerical status.

By 1985/86 the first women deacons were being included (although women priests ordained in Hong Kong were included even in the 1970s) while other more recent innovations – from the 1990s onwards – have included optional email addresses, together with lists of those clergy who have died since the previous edition. Notes on "How to Address the Clergy" have been retained. A small number of clergy have been excluded at their own request, or have allowed their biographies to appear minus a contact address. The Church Commissioners soon replaced the traditional black hardback bindings in favour of red and also introduced a separate softback alternative version.

Since 2004 there has also been a frequently updated Internet edition of Crockford, which is available by subscription. More recently the directory has also joined in with social networking, operating a Twitter account since 2012.

An alternative to the main work, Crockford's Shorter Directory, focused almost entirely on the Church of England and omitting all past biographical details, was issued as a single edition in 1953–54.

== Prefaces ==
The well-known tradition of having an extensive but anonymous preface offering a general review of events within the Anglican Communion – together with some occasionally sharp and controversial commentary – evolved gradually during the early part of the 20th century. Previous prefaces had tended to be much briefer and they had often been limited merely to explaining the directory's in-house policies. After the events following the publication of the 1987/88 edition, which had ended with the death by suicide of the Revd Gareth Bennett, this tradition of the anonymous preface was discontinued.

An anthology, Crockford Prefaces: The Editor Looks Back, anonymously edited by Richard Henry Malden and covering the previous 25 years, was published by the Oxford University Press in 1947.

== Locating previous issues ==
County libraries each have their own policies, but there are good collections in a number of major academic and ecclesiastical libraries, including the Bodleian Library, Cambridge University Library, Lambeth Palace Library, Canterbury Cathedral Library, Palace Green Library, Durham, York Minster Library, the Guildhall Library and the Society of Genealogists.

Besides the 1865 reprint, a small number of early editions have been reissued in CD format by various publishers, including Archive CD Books. Scanned copies of other early editions have also begun to appear on the World Wide Web.

== Crockford references in fiction ==
Crockford is referenced in Dorothy Sayers's 1927 detective novel Unnatural Death (chapter XI) where Lord Peter Wimsey uses "this valuable work of reference" in trying to trace a clergyman who is important for solving the book's mystery.

Another fictional character holding Crockford on his bookshelves was Sherlock Holmes, who during one of his final short stories ("The Adventure of the Retired Colourman"), consulted his copy before dispatching his colleague Dr Watson, together with another companion, to a distant part of Essex. There they interviewed "a big solemn rather pompous clergyman" who received them angrily in his study.

Holmes also describes to Mary Russell that he used Crockford to research the preacher Margery Childe, in Laurie R. King's A Monstrous Regiment of Women.

The character Dulcie Mainwaring prefers Crockford's format to Who's Who while reflecting on researching in the Public Record Office in London in Barbara Pym's No Fond Return of Love.

In a chapter entitled "The Visitor in the Night" by Freeman Wills Crofts of the book The Floating Admiral, Inspector Rudge looks up the background of Reverend Mount in a Crockford's.
