= Dods Parliamentary Companion =

Book by Charles Dod

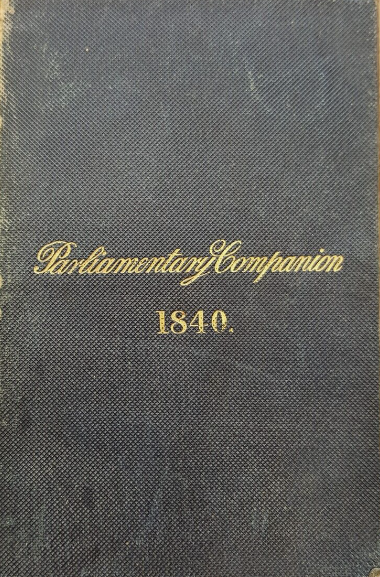
- Author: Charles Dod
- Language: English
- Publisher: Dods Group
- Publication date: 1832 to present
- Publication place: United Kingdom

Dods Parliamentary Companion (formerly "Dod's Parliamentary Companion") is an annual politics reference book published in the United Kingdom.

It provides biographies and contact information on members of the Houses of Parliament and the Civil Service. It was first published in 1832 by Charles Dod; and is now published by the firm of Dods.

Dods also publishes on the web as Dods People (formerly "Dods Online").
