= The Cambridge Quarterly =

The Cambridge Quarterly is a literary journal. It often publishes articles on cinema, music, painting, and sculpture. It also endows a prize for, and publishes, the best Cambridge University Finals dissertation each year.

The journal was founded by Harold Andrew Mason in 1966.
