= Ronald Fleming (interior decorator) =

Ronald Fleming (1896 - 1968) was an English interior decorator.

== Biography ==
Ronald Fleming was born in Scotland, the son of a medical doctor from Kelso.

He attended Epsom College and then, in the 1920s, studied interior design at the New York School in Paris.

Between his study in England and France, he served during World War I with the Cold Stream Guards.

In 1931 he worked in Paris with Keeble Ltd (Keeble Ltd had its office in London at Carlisle House). He worked also for Kelso Ltd and Arundell Clarke. In 1932 he opened, and managed, the decoration department at Fortnum & Mason. In 1949 he became the director of Mann and Fleming Ltd.

In 1931 he published Talk on Decoration.

In 1932 he organized the exhibition "Modern Designs for Mural Decoration" at Carlisle House, opened by Osbert Sitwell and including works, among others, by Roger Fry, Duncan Grant and Edward Halliday. He also gave lectures on ethos and technique.

Fleming was friends with Roy De Maistre and in 1953 he bought Flower Piece, which passed to Adrian Brookholding-Jones, grand-son of the sculptor Adrian Jones, and then sold at Brookholding-Jones' death.

His commissions included: the ballroom in the Royal Palace in Athens for King George II of Greece; the Penthouse Suite at the Dorchester Hotel, together with Oliver Messel; the interiors of Dalmeny House for Harry Primrose, 6th Earl of Rosebery; stage sets and murals.

Fleming lived at 20, Thurloe Square, London. In magazines of the time, he was often introduced as a bachelor interior designer, a subtle way to say that he was gay. The same applied to Oliver Frederick Ford, Carl Toms and Alan Tagg. Fleming lived all his adult life, until death, with Geoffrey Houghton-Brown (1903-1993), an authority on 18th-century French furniture.

== Legacy ==
The Ronald Fleming interior decorator papers, 1915 - 1976 are held by the Archive of Art & Design of the Victoria & Albert Museum. Many of Fleming’s books were bequeathed to the London Library.
