= William Lipscomb (writer) =

Lipscomb, William (1754–1842), writer

William Lipscomb was baptised on 9 July 1754 in Winchester and died at Brompton, London, on 25 May 1842. He was an English clergyman, translator and poet.

== Life ==
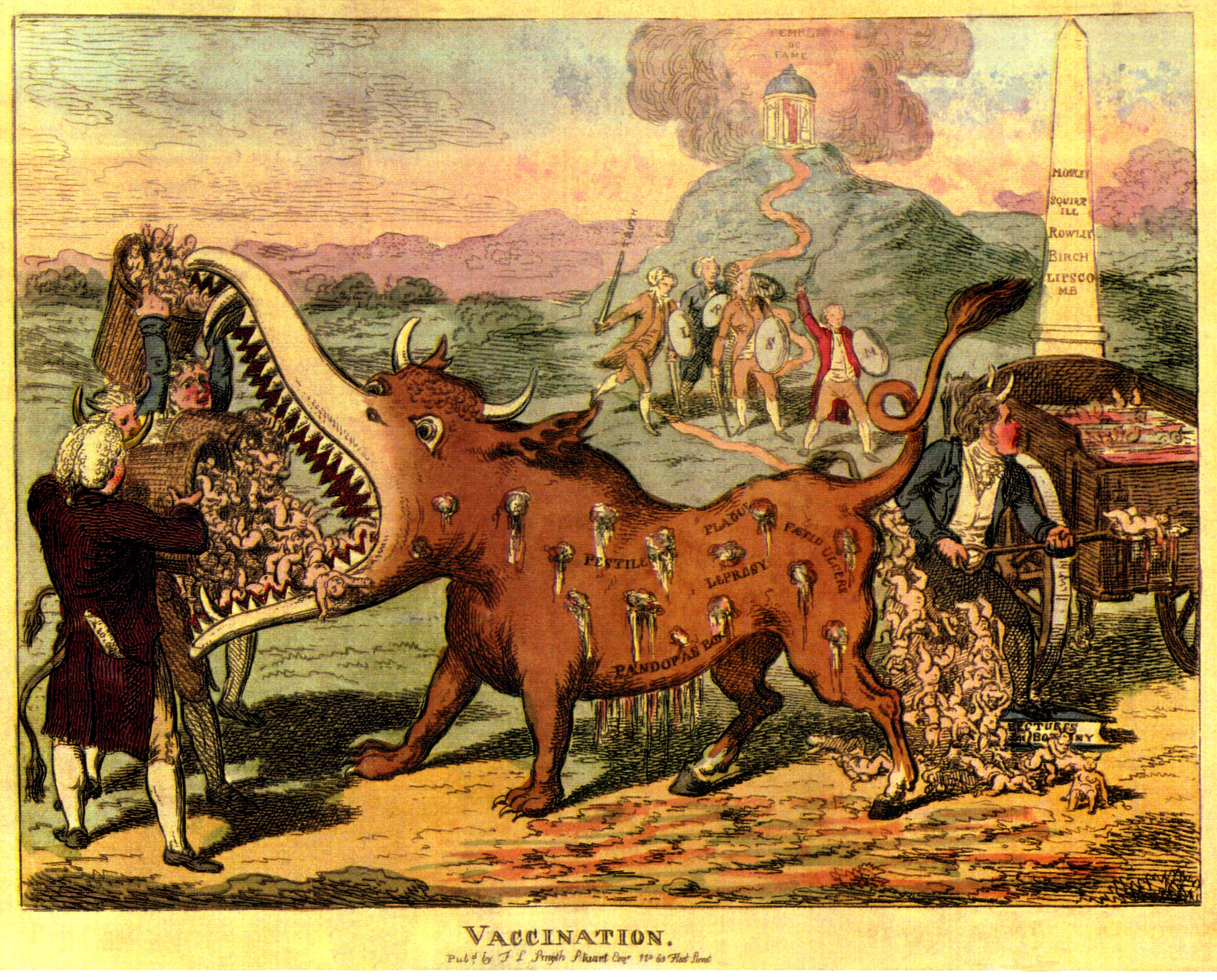
Satirical print of a proposed monument to Lipscomb and other recommenders of inoculation

William Lipscomb was born into a medical family. His father Thomas and his uncle James were surgeons, as was his cousin, the antiquary George Lipscomb. He was schooled at Winchester College and then entered Corpus Christi College, Oxford, in 1770. While there, he won the prize for English verse in 1772 with a poem "On the Beneficial Effects of Inoculation", which was often reprinted thereafter, in individual editions and in collections. Samuel Taylor Coleridge was later to misquote it unfairly as an example of bad poetic convention in his Biographia Literaria. Lipscomb graduated B.A. in 1774 and M.A. in 1784. For some years he was private tutor and subsequently chaplain to Henry Vane, the future Earl of Darlington, at Raby Castle. In 1789 he was presented to the rectory of Welbury in the North Riding of Yorkshire and was also Master of St. John's Hospital, Barnard Castle. By his marriage in 1780 with Margaret, second daughter of Francis Cooke, cashier of the navy, he had a large family of whom ten children survived him. His eldest son, Christopher Lipscomb, was appointed the first bishop of Jamaica and he was allowed to hand over his rector’s position at Welbury to his son Francis in 1832.

== Writing ==
Lipscomb’s first collection, Poems, to which are added translations of select Italian sonnets (Oxford, 1784) was judged “seldom [to] rise above mediocrity”, although the reviewer allowed that the poem on inoculation was the best of them. Most of the rest was occasional verse written while at Oxford. The inclusion of two poems associated there with the deprecated Batheaston literary circle may well have seemed to the reviewer sufficient proof of poetic lack of judgment.

The versions from the Italian (lyrics rather than ‘sonnets’) included in that collection, equally with some from Horace’s Latin, appearing in his later Poems and Translations (London 1830), owe much to contemporary poetic conventions. However, another of his projects, the translation of the fables of Jean Pierre Claris de Florian, had the distinction of being the first and only sizeable English selection from that author; two others that followed later in the 19th century were published in Canada and the United States.

Mixed reviews greeted Lipscomb’s next major publication, The Canterbury Tales of Chaucer completed in a Modern Version (1795). Following a preliminary trial with The Pardoner’s Tale (1792), he had turned to re-editing George Ogle’s unfinished compilation of The Canterbury Tales of Chaucer modernised by several hands (1741) with twelve versions of his own. But Lipscomb confessed in his preface to purging the work of “the grossness and indelicacy of the times in which Chaucer lived"; he omitted the bawdy "The Miller's Tale" and “The Reeves Tale” altogether, even writing out those characters from the Prologue. Not all readers appreciated this, however. “The delicacy which the translator affects is ridiculous,” accused The English Review; “a translator should always retain the sentiment of his original”.

Lipscomb also addressed two public letters (1794-5) to Henry Duncombe, M.P. for Yorkshire, on British participation in the French Revolutionary Wars. These pamphlets The Critical Review found ephemeral and overtaken by events.
