= Paternoster Row =

Street in London

Coordinates: 51°30′53″N 0°5′53″W

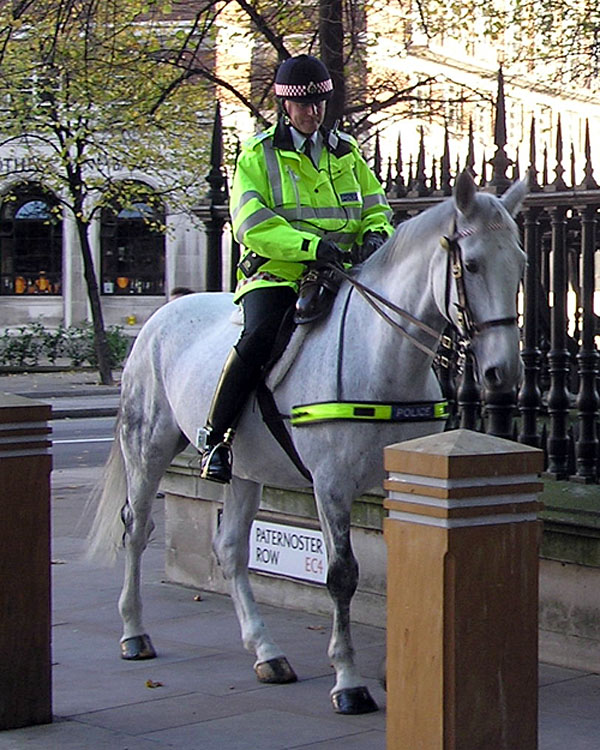
A mounted officer of the City of London Police entering the pedestrian area on New Change and Paternoster Row in November 2004

Paternoster Row is a street in the City of London that was a centre of the London publishing trade, with booksellers operating from the street. Paternoster Row was described as "almost synonymous" with the book trade. It was part of an area called St Paul's Churchyard. In time Paternoster Row itself was used inclusively of various alleys, courts and side streets. Largely destroyed during aerial bombing in World War II, the street's area is now the site of much of the post-war Paternoster Square development.

== Current route ==
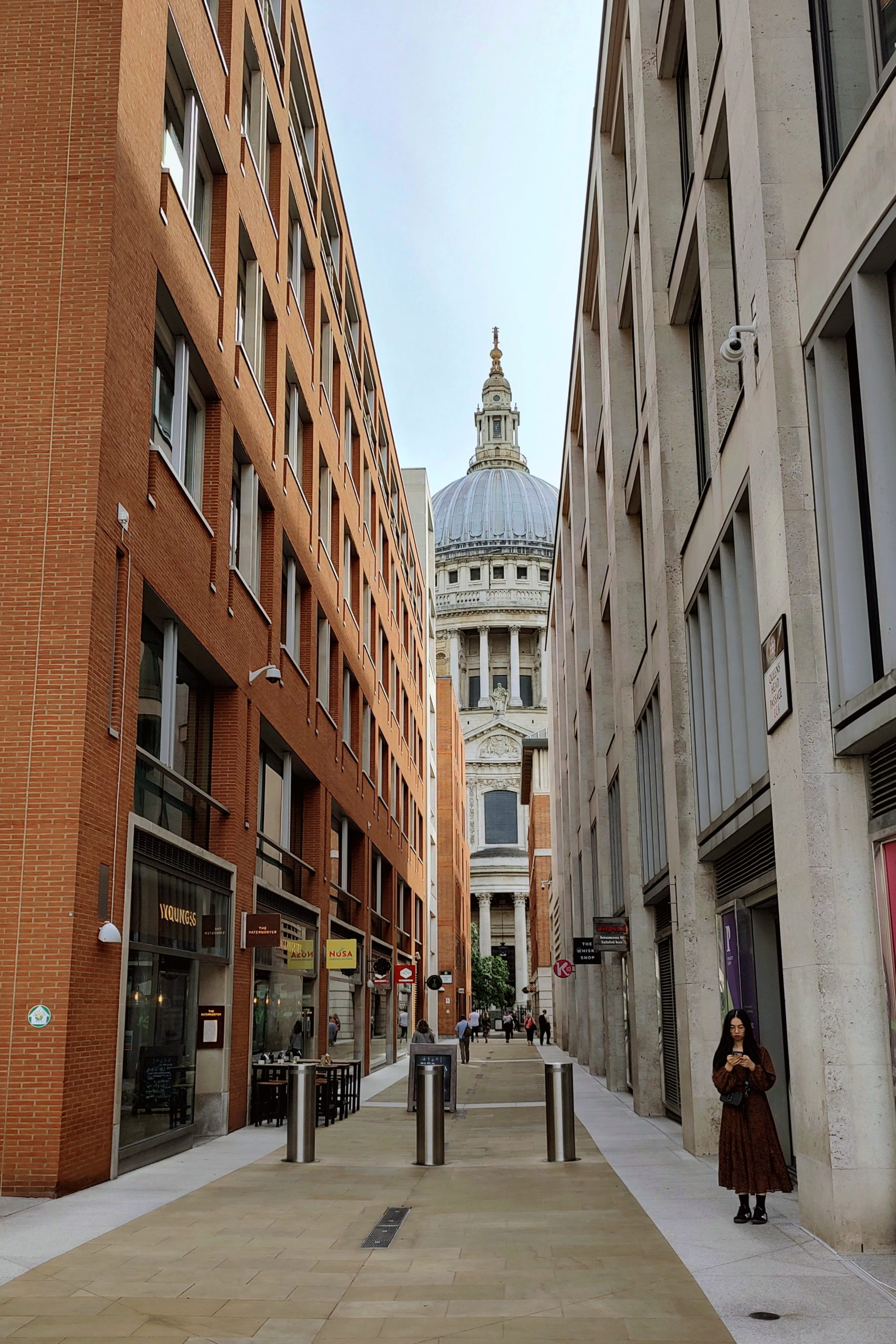
View along Queen's Head Passage of the dome of St Paul's Cathedral

The street was devastated by aerial bombardment during World War II. In 2003 the area was pedestrianised with Paternoster Square, the modern home of the London Stock Exchange, at the west end, and a paved area around St Pauls' Coop and an entrance to St Pauls tube station at the East, bounded by St Pauls Churchyard, New Change, Cheapside and Payner Alley. The route of Paternoster Row is not demarcated across the open areas, although there is a road sign at the south of the eastern area, perhaps designating the area as Paternoster Row. Between Payner Alley and Queen's Head Passage/Cannon Alley the road is clearly marked as Paternoster Row. The building to the south, Paternoster House has an address in St Pauls Churchyard (the pedestrian way north of the bounds of the churchyard proper), where its south face is. There are no signs on the next segment up to Paternoster Square, nor around the square. The exit from the south-west corner of the square, along - or very close to - the previous route of Paternoster Row, debouching on Ave Maria Lane – Warwick Avenue opposite Amen Corner, is signed as Paternoster Lane.

Paternoster Square itself - the open plaza, rather than the development - shares almost no area with the former Paternoster Square.

== Name ==
The street is supposed to have received its name from the fact that, when the monks and clergy of St Paul's Cathedral went in procession chanting the great litany, they would recite the Lord's Prayer (Pater Noster being its opening line in Latin) in the litany along this part of the route. The prayers said at these processions may have also given the names to nearby Ave Maria Lane and Amen Corner.

Another possible etymology is that it was the main place in London where paternoster beads were made. The beads were popular with the laity, as well as illiterate monks and friars at the time, who prayed 50 Pater Noster prayers (Latin for "Our Father") three times a day as a substitute for the 150 psalms recited a day by literate monks.

== History ==
Houses in St. Paul's Churchyard were damaged in the Great Fire of London in 1666, burning down the old St. Paul's Cathedral. When the new St. Paul's Cathedral was erected, booksellers returned after a number of years. At the same time Pissing Alley which linked Paternoster Row to St. Paul's Churchyard was rebuilt and renamed Canon Alley the name it still bears, although it was also referred to as Petty Canons.

A bust of Aldus Manutius, writer and publisher, can be seen above the fascia of number 13. The bust was placed there in 1820 by Bible publisher Samuel Bagster.

It was reported that Charlotte Brontë and Anne Brontë stayed at the Chapter Coffeehouse on the street when visiting London in 1847. They were in the city to meet their publisher regarding Jane Eyre.

A fire broke out at number 20 Paternoster Row on 6 February 1890. Occupied by sheet music publisher Fredrick Pitman, the first floor was found to be on fire by a police officer at 21:30. The fire alarm was sounded at St. Martin's-le-Grand and fire crews extinguished the flames in half an hour. The floor was badly damaged, with smoke, heat and water impacting the rest of the building.

This blaze was followed later the same year on 5 October by 'an alarming fire'. At 00:30 a fire was discovered at W. Hawtin and Sons, based in numbers 24 and 25. The wholesale stationers' warehouse was badly damaged by the blaze.

On 21 November 1894, police raided an alleged gambling club which was based on the first floor of 59 Paternoster Row. The club known both as the 'City Billiard Club' and the 'Junior Gresham Club' had been there barely three weeks at the time of the raid. Forty-five arrests were made, including club owner Albert Cohen.

On 4 November 1939, a large-scale civil defence exercise was held in the City of London. One of the simulated seats of fire was in Paternoster Row.

Trübner & Co. was one of the publishing companies on Paternoster Row.

== Destruction during World War II ==
The street was devastated by aerial bombardment during the Blitz of World War II, suffering particularly heavy damage in the night raid of 29–30 December 1940, later characterised as the Second Great Fire of London, during which an estimated 5 million books were lost in the fires caused by tens of thousands of incendiary bombs.

After the raid a letter was written to The Times describing:

'…a passage leading through "Simpkins" [which] has a mantle of stone which has survived the melancholy ruins around it. On this stone is the Latin inscription that seems to embody all that we are fighting for :- VERBUM DOMINI MANET IN AETERNUM' [The word of God remains forever].

Another correspondent with the newspaper, Ernest W. Larby, described his experience of 25 years working on Paternoster Row:

…had he [Lord Quickswood] worked for 25 years, as I did, in Paternoster Row, he would not have quite so much enthusiasm for those narrow ways into whose buildings the sun never penetrated… What these dirty, narrow ways of the greatest city in the world really stood for from the people's viewpoint are things we had better bury.

— Ernest W. Larby

The ruins of Paternoster Row were visited by Wendell Willkie in January 1941. He said, "I thought that the burning of Paternoster Row, the street where the books are published, was rather symbolic. They [the Germans] have destroyed the place where the truth is told".

== Printers, publishers and booksellers formerly based in Paternoster Row ==
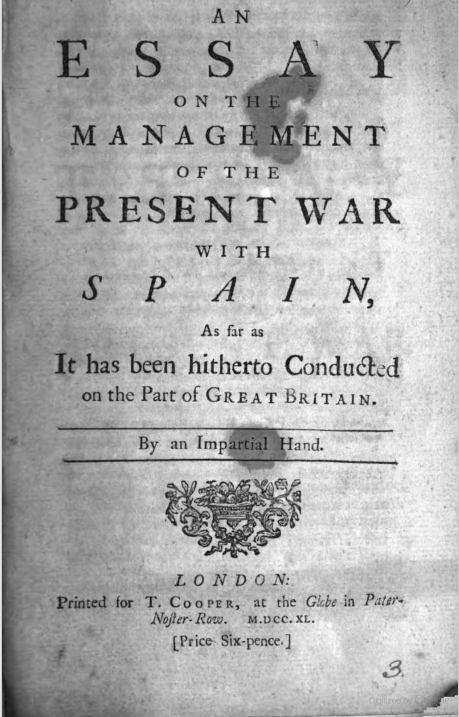
Title page of An Essay on the Management of the Present War with Spain printed for T. Cooper at The Globe

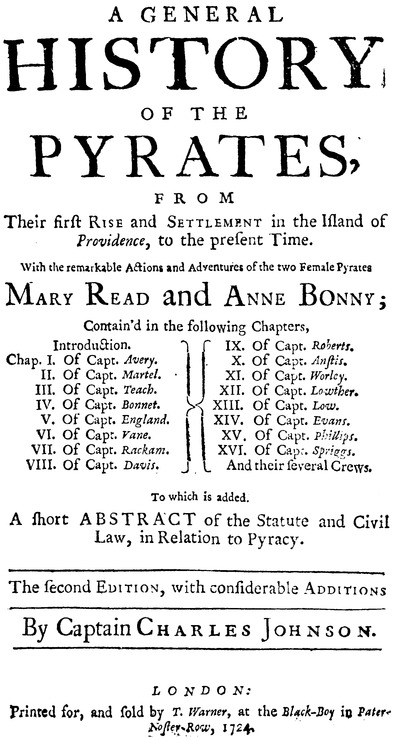
Title page of A General History of the Pyrates

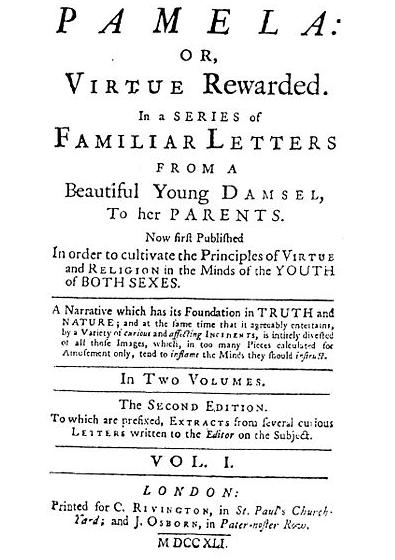
Second edition of Pamela

Note: Before about 1762, premises in London had signs rather than numbers.

=== By sign ===
- The Tyger's Head – Christopher Barker (????), his son Robert Barker (1545–1629)
- The Star – Henry Denham (1564)
- The White Lion – Francis Constable (1616–1624)
- The Brazen Serpent (1627–1650) – Robert Dawlman (1627–1635, 1635–1638, died 1659), Luke Fawne (1635–1638, 1639–1641), Samuel Gellibrand (1639–1641, 1641–1650)
- The Golden Ball/Ball (1650–1675) – Samuel Gellibrand (1654, 1655, 1656, 1661, 1667, 1669, 1673) (died 1675), two of his sons Edward Gellibrand (1676, 1678, 1679, 1680, 1681, 1685), John Gellibrand (1679–1685), F.? Gellibrand (1683)
- The Gun – F.? Brome (1683)
- The Bell – B. Crayle (1683)
- The Sun – G. Wells (1683)
- The Angel – Moses Pitt (1683)
- The Bear – O. Blagrave (1683)
- The Rose and Crown – R. Chiswell (1683)
- The Crane – Edward Brewster (1672-1683)
- The Peacock – Robert Clavel/Clavell (1683)
- The Three Pigeons – F.? Baker (1683)
- The Golden Lyon/Golden Lion – F.? Robinson (1683)
- The Red Lyon/Red Lion – H. Bonwick (1683)
- The Phoenix/Phœnix – H. Mortlock (1683), Ed. Giles (1683)
- The Three Flower-de-luces/Three Flower-de-Luces – H. Hatley (1683)
- The Bishopshead/Bishops Head/Bishops head – W. Kettilby (1683)
- The Princes Arms/Prince's Arms (Arms of the Prince of Wales) – Samuel Smith (1683, 1692, 1694, 1695, 1704, 1705), Benjamin Walford (1694, 1695, 1705), printers to the Royal Society
- The Globe – F.? Taylor (1683), T. Cooper (1740)
- The Ship (later No. 38–41) – B. Tooke (1683), John Taylor (1710–1719), his nephew William Taylor (1708, 1719–1724), subsequently Longmans (see No. 39)
- The Black Swan – John and Awnsham Churchill – possibly John Taylor (????), later his nephew William Taylor (????), subsequently Longmans (????) (see No. 39)
- Bible and Crown Charles Rivington c. 1711-42 (succeeded by Rivington (publishers) (qv) and others at St Paul's Churchyard and environs)
- The Crown – T. Rickerton (1721)
- The Dove – J. Batley (1723)
- The Black-Boy – T. Warner (1724)

=== By building number ===
- No. 1 – J. Souter (1817), Jan Van Voorst (1851) (see No. 3)
- No. 2 – Orr and Co. (1851), J. W. Myers (~1800)
- No. 3 – Jan Van Voorst (1838) (see No. 1)
- No. 5 – Groombridge and Sons (c. 1845 to c. 1875)
- No. 6 Panyer Alley – R. Groombridge (prior to c. 1845)
- No. 7 Oxford University Press Warehouse (1882)
- No. 9 – S. W. Partridge and Co. (1876)
- No. 10 – W. W. Gardner (1870/1)
- No. 11 – W. Brittain (1840)
- No. 12 – Trubner and Co. (1856)
- No. 13 – Talbot (1908)
- No. 15 – Samuel Bagster and Sons (1817, 1825, 1851, 1870) (Bagster and Thomas, the printers were in Bartholomew close as of 1927.)
- No. 16 – Alex Hogg (1780-1786)
- No. 17 – Thomas Kelly (1840)
- No. 20 & 21 – F. Pitman, later F. Pitman Hart and Co. Ltd. (1869 (No. 20)-1904)
- No. 21 – J. Parsons (1792)
- No. 22 – The Electrical Review (1876–1897)
- No. 23 – Piper, Stephenson, and Spence (1857)
- No. 24 – George Wightman (1831)
- No. 25 – George Robinson, from 1763 to 1801, with John Roberts, 1763 to 1776
- No. 27 Ivy Lane – Walton and Maberly (also at 28 Upper Gower Street) (1837-1857), Hodder & Stoughton (from 1868-06-16)
- No. 31 – Sheed & Ward (1926)
- No. 32 - T. C. Hansard (1830)
- No. 33 – Hamilton and Co. (1851 1854)
- No. 34 – Hurst and Blackett. (1930s)
- No. 37 – James Duncan (1825–1838), Blackwood and Sons (1851)
- No. 39 (see The Ship) – Longman, Hust, Rees, Orme, Brown and Green (1825), later Longman and Co. (1851), later Longmans, Green, and Co. (1866, 1899, 1902)
- No. 40 – West and Hughes (~1800)
- No. 47 – Baldwin, Cradock, and Joy (1817, 1818), Baldwin and Craddock, later Chambers (1891)
- No. 56 – The Religious Tract Society (1851)
- No. 60 – The Sunday School Union (1851) later Trübner & Co (1872)
- No. 62 – Eliot Stock (1876, 1893, 1910)
- No. 65 – Houlston and Stoneman

=== Unknown building address ===
- C. Davis (1740)
- Hawes, Clarke and Collins (1771)
- Oxford University Press – Bible warehouse destroyed by fire in 1822, rebuilt c. 1880
- Sampson Low (after 1887)
- H. Woodfall & Co. G. Woodfall, printer, 1809.
- Marshall Brothers Ltd., Keswick House, Paternoster Row, London
- Thomas Nelson
- Mr Collins (printer of moral and religious tracts) (1817)
- Sherwood, Neely, and Jones (1817)
- R. Fenner (1817)
- Kent and Co. (1859)
- Jackson & Walford
- Hutchinson & Co.
- Ralph Smith Kirby (1802)
- J. Osborn, 1716

== Others based in Paternoster Row ==
- No. 34 – Boys Brigade London HQ (was Hurst and Blackett in 1930s)
- No. 59 – Junior Gresham Club, opened and destroyed by fire in 1894
- No. 60 – Friendly Female Society, "for indigent widows and single women of good character, entirely under the management of ladies."

== In popular culture ==
- The Siege of Paternoster Row was an anonymous 1826 booklet in verse, attacking the reliability of bankers.
- The Paternoster Gang are a trio of Victorian detectives aligned with the Doctor in the television series Doctor Who, so named because they are based in Paternoster Row.
- In the episode "Young England" of the 2016 television series Victoria, a stalker of Queen Victoria indicates that he lives on Paternoster Row. (Coincidentally, the actress playing Victoria in the series, Jenna Coleman, had appeared in a few episodes of Doctor Who that featured the above-mentioned Paternoster Gang.)
- The Madeline Martin novel The Last Bookshop in London makes numerous references to Paternoster Row, and it mentions the destruction of the street during World War II.

== See also ==
- History of London
- Doctors' Commons
- Fleet Street
- Longmans
- Paul's walk
- St. Paul's Cross
- Religious Tract Society
