= Richard Gilbert (printer) =

Richard Gilbert (1794–1852) was an English printer and compiler of reference works.

== Life ==
He was born in St. John's Square, Clerkenwell, London, the son Robert Gilbert, died 10 January 1815 aged 51, was a printer and partner in the firm of Law & Gilbert of St. John's Square. He started life as an accountant of the Society for Promoting Christian Knowledge in Bartlett's Buildings. On the death of his father, he joined his brother Robert, who died in 1818, as a printer at St. John's Square.

Gilbert's business expanded as a result of his marriage in 1823. On the death of his brother-in-law George Byrom Whittaker, on 13 December 1847, the family acquired a fortune, and his only son, Robert Gilbert, succeeded to his uncle's share in the business as a wholesale bookseller and publisher. In 1830 Gilbert, who had since his brother's death carried on the printing business alone, took into partnership William Rivington, youngest son of Charles Rivington III, the bookseller of Waterloo Place, and as Gilbert & Rivington continued the establishment until his death.

Attached to the Church of England, Gilbert was involved in the building of St Philip's and St Mark's churches in the Clerkenwell area. In 1841 he was elected one of the stockkeepers of the Company of Stationers; he was for many years one of the general committee of the Royal Literary Fund; and he was a governor of Christ's Hospital and St Bartholomew's Hospital. He died at 70 Euston Square, London, 26 February 1852, aged 58, and was buried in the vaults of St. John's Church, Clerkenwell, on 4 March.

== Works ==
Gilbert wrote and published in 1829 the Liber Scholasticus; a second edition was The Parent's School and College Guide (1843). He compiled and edited the Clerical Guide or Ecclesiastical Directory from 1817. He also planned and edited The Clergyman's Almanack, 1818, and Gilbert's Clergyman's Almanack and Churchman's Miscellany, 1835, both published by the Company of Stationers.

== Family ==
Gilbert married, on 11 September 1823, Anne, only daughter of the Rev. George Whittaker of Northfleet, and sister of George Byrom Whittaker, bookseller and publisher.

== Notes ==
Attribution

This article incorporates text from a publication now in the public domain: Stephen, Leslie, ed. (1890). "Gilbert, Richard". Dictionary of National Biography. Vol. 21. London: Smith, Elder & Co.
