= Ave Maria Lane =

Street in the City of London, England

Coordinates: 51.5142°N 0.1008°W

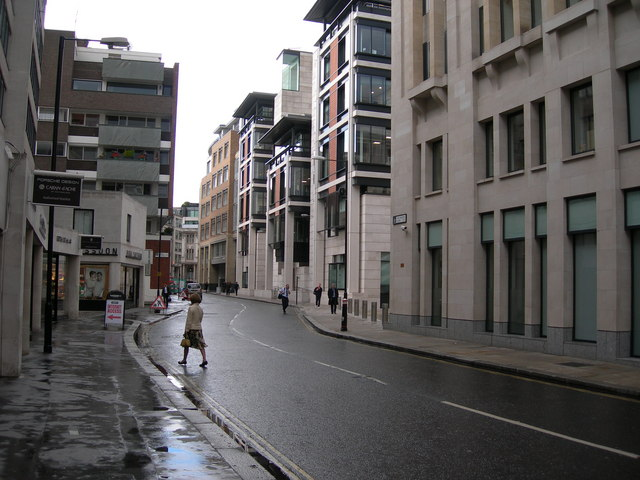
Ave Maria Lane

Ave Maria Lane is a street in the City of London, to the west of St. Paul's Cathedral. It is the southern extension of Warwick Lane, between Amen Corner and Ludgate Hill.

On the feast day of Corpus Christi, monks would say prayers in the Corpus Christi procession to St. Paul's Cathedral. They set off from Paternoster Row chanting the Lord's Prayer (Pater noster being the opening words of the prayer in Latin). They would reach the final "Amen" as they turned the corner into Ave Maria Lane, after which they would chant Hail Mary (Ave Maria in Latin).

Ave Maria Lane is home to the Grade I listed building Stationers' Hall, the livery hall of the Worshipful Company of Stationers and Newspaper Makers since 1670.

According to Colsoni's 1693 guide to London (Le Guide de Londres) Ave Maria Lane was a gathering place for German expatriates ("... à l'Enseigne du Black-boy au Latin Coffee-house ...").

The marathon route of the 2012 Summer Olympics passed along Ave Maria Lane.
