= Longman (surname) =

Longman is a surname. Notable people with the surname include:

- Albert Heber Longman (1880–1954), Australian naturalist and museum director
- Charles Longman (1852–1934), played in the 1873 FA Cup Final
- Danny Longman (born 1987), English ultra-endurance athlete
- Evelyn Beatrice Longman (1874–1954), US sculptor
- Frank Longman (1882–1928), American football player and coach
- George Longman (cricketer) (1852–1938), English cricketer
- George Longman (MP) (1776–1822), English politician and business
- Sir Hubert Harry Longman (1856–1940), the sole Longman baronet
- Irene Longman (1877–1964), Australian politician
- Phillip Longman (born 1956), American demographer
- Richard Longman, British racing driver
- Thomas Longman (1699–1755), English publisher who founded the publishing house of Longman
- Thomas Norton Longman (1771–1842), his great nephew, English publisher
- Thomas Longman (1804–1879), son of Thomas Norton Longman, English publisher
- Tremper Longman, Old Testament scholar
- William Longman (1892–1967), English croquet player

== See also ==
- Longman family tree, showing the relationship between some of the above
