= Thomas Longman =

Thomas Longman may refer to:

- Thomas Longman (1699–1755), English publisher who founded the publishing house of Longman
- Thomas Norton Longman (1771–1842), his great nephew, English publisher
- Thomas Longman (1804–1879), son of Thomas Norton Longman, English publisher

== See also ==
- Thomas Langmann (born 1971), French film producer and actor
