= Longman (disambiguation) =

Longman is a British publishing firm.

Longman may also refer to:

- Longman (surname)
- Longman (band), Japanese punk-rock band
- Longman House, Civil War era home in Hempstead (village), New York, US
- Division of Longman, Australian electoral division
- Leeroy Thornhill or Longman. musician
- Longman, Inverness, Scotland, UK

== See also ==
- Long Man (disambiguation)
