= Construction Law Journal =

UK journal

- Type: Ten Times Per Year
- Format: Journal
- Owner: LexisNexis
- Editor: Nicholas Barrett
- Founded: April 1990
- Headquarters: Halsbury House, 35 Chancery Lane, London WC2A 1EL, UK
- Price: Subscription: UK 1 year: £287
- ISSN: 0963-6706

Construction Law is a semi-annual English-language journal providing news and articles on the construction industry.The journal is written for the non-legal professional involved in contractual and other legal matters in the industry. The journal is owned by LexisNexis which is part of Reed Elsevier.

Articles within the journal are written by lawyers, barristers, academics, insurance and health and safety specialists, who specialise in construction law.

== Features ==
Construction Law offers six main feature length analysis articles per issue, written by construction lawyers, barristers and academics, as well as insurance and health and safety specialists. In addition, developments in adjudication, industry standard contract forms, key decisions from the courts, alternative forms of dispute resolution, and forthcoming legislation are covered.

The journal also includes the following regular sections:

- News section: reports on procurement and contractual as well as health and safety matters.
- Guest editor: specialist lawyers offer opinions on legal issues affecting the construction industry
- State of Play: a table tracking new and proposed legislation in the UK and EU
- Reports from the Courts, written by Michael Furmston, provides rulings from the Technology and Construction Court as well as results of appeals.
- Contracts Monitor on building contracts, including offerings from the Joint Contracts Tribunal
- Alternative Dispute Resolution is a regular examination of issues relating to non-litigious methods of dispute resolution.
- Book reviews

== History ==
The journal was originally published by Construction Legal Press Ltd in April 1990. Eclipse Group Ltd then acquired the journal in 1991. It was sold to Butterworths Tolley in 2002 and through a series of mergers it became part of LexisNexis.

Nicholas Barrett, a specialist construction journalist, has been editor since 1994.

== See also ==
- Corporate Rescue and Insolvency Journal
- Counsel
- Justice of the Peace
- Justice of the Peace Reports
- New Law Journal
- Tolley's Employment Law Newsletter
