= Corporate Rescue and Insolvency =

Journal

Corporate Rescue and Insolvency Journal
- Type: Bi-monthly (6 issues)
- Format: Journal
- Owner: LexisNexis
- Editor: Carolyn Swain
- Founded: ILP (Jan/Feb 1985) / CRI (Jan 2008)
- Headquarters: Halsbury House, 35 Chancery Lane, London WC2A 1EL, UK
- Price: Subscription: UK 1 year, £310
- ISSN: 1756-2465

Corporate Rescue and Insolvency is a bi-monthly English-language journal with commentary and analysis on domestic and international insolvency and restructuring law.

The editorial board is made up of practising and academic lawyers and is supported by a panel of contributing law, accountancy firms and organisations providing content.

== Features ==
The journal includes features and articles on technical and practical issues; and an international features section. Authors on the "In Practice" team include solicitors at Freshfields, Eversheds, Norton Rose, Dickinson Dees, and features by KPMG.

The international features section has contributors from Slaughter and May, Denton Wilde Sapte, Lovells, and Begbies Traynor.

Regular sections also include:

- Turnaround section with features from the Institute for Turnaround (IFT) and R3;
- Legislative update section provided by Ashurst;
- Market spotlight section with a summary of developments in the restructuring and insolvency sector;
- Sector focus section with views and opinions on insolvency and restructuring topics from other sectors; and
- Case coverage supplied by CMS Cameron McKenna in Case Reporter and a summary of recent cases by 11 Stone Buildings in Cases Alerter.

== History ==
The journal was originally published under the title of Tolley's Insolvency Law & Practice (ILP) by Frank Cass & Co in January/February 1985. In 1991, the journal was sold to Tolley and through a series of mergers it became part of LexisNexis in 2003. LexisNexis is owned by Reed Elsevier.

Carolyn Swain was appointed editor in May 2007. The journal was relaunched in January 2008, under the title of Corporate Rescue and Insolvency.

== See also ==
- Construction Law Journal
- Counsel
- Justice of the Peace Magazine
- Justice of the Peace Reports
- New Law Journal
- Tolley's Employment Law Newsletter
