= George Longman (cricketer) =

English cricketer

Personal information
- Full name: George Henry Longman
- Born: 3 August 1852; Farnborough, Hampshire, England
- Died: 19 August 1938 (aged 86); Wimbledon Common, Surrey, England
- Batting: Right-handed
- Bowling: Unknown
- Role: Occasional wicket-keeper
- Relatives: Henry Longman (son)

Domestic team information
- Years: Team
- 1872–1875: Cambridge University
- 1875–1885: Hampshire
- 1877–1881: Marylebone Cricket Club

Career statistics
Competition	First-class
Matches	68
Runs scored	2,448
Batting average	20.57
100s/50s	–/11
Top score	98
Balls bowled	288
Wickets	3
Bowling average	60.00
5 wickets in innings	–
10 wickets in match	–
Best bowling	1/1
Catches/stumpings	41/4
- Source: Cricinfo, 28 February 2010

George Henry Longman (3 August 1852 – 19 August 1938) was an English first-class cricketer, cricket administrator, and publisher. Longman played in nearly seventy first-class matches between 1872 and 1885, scoring nearly 2,500 runs. As a publisher, he was a partner in the family publishing business, Longman.

== Early life and education ==
The son of Thomas Longman, he was born in August 1852 at Farnborough, Hampshire. He was educated at Eton College, where he played for the college cricket team, including as captain in 1871. From there, he matriculated to Trinity College, Cambridge. While studying at Cambridge, Longman made his debut in first-class cricket for Cambridge University Cricket Club against the Marylebone Cricket Club at Fenner's during his freshman year, the same year in which he gained his blue by virtue of playing in The University Match against Oxford University at Lord's. He opened the batting alongside Arthur Tabor in the match, sharing in a partnership of 104 in the Cambridge first innings, with Longman contributing 80 runs to help Cambridge win the match by an innings and 166 runs. Longman played first-class cricket for Cambridge until 1875, captaining the university in his last year. He partook in each of the four University Matches between 1872 and 1875, though featured on the winning side just once. In total, he made 27 appearances for Cambridge, scoring 1,019 runs at an average of 22.15, with four half centuries. In the field he took 11 catches, and on occasion he kept wicket, making a single stumping.

During his studies, he also played first-class cricket for the Gentlemen in the Gentlemen v Players fixtures of 1873, 1874 and 1875. He also played for the Gentlemen of the South against the Players of the South at The Oval in 1873. After graduating from Cambridge, he entered into the family publishing business Longman.

== Post-Cambridge cricket ==
Longman first played for Hampshire in July 1875, against Sussex at Hove. He played four times for Hampshire in 1876, and played for the Gentlemen against the Players and for the Gentlemen of England against Cambridge University; in the latter match, he made his career-highest first-class score of 98 runs. The following season, he played for the MCC against Cambridge University, in addition to making three appearances for Hampshire. In 1878, he played for the South in the North v South fixture at Lord's, in addition to playing twice for Hampshire and once for the MCC. A gap of three years followed before Longman next appeared in first-class cricket, which he did in 1881 when he played one match a piece for the MCC and Hampshire, before playing twice for Hampshire in 1882. He played exclusively for Hampshire in 1883, making five appearances, before making a further seven appearances in 1884. He played his final season of first-class cricket in 1885, when he made a further three appearances for Hampshire. For Hampshire, he made 27 first-class appearances, scoring 856 runs at an average of 17.46, making four half centuries.

In Longman's overall first-class career, he scored 2,448 runs at an average of 20.57, with 11 half centuries. In the field, he took 41 catches and made four stumpings. He was described by The Times as "very keen on fielding", with it being noted that this aspect of his game had greatly improved while he was at Cambridge.

== Later life ==
Following the death of Robert Dyer in 1884, he took over the financial responsibilities of Longman. Longman was the master of the Surrey Union Foxhounds from 1900 to 1904. He later served as the president of Surrey County Cricket Club from 1926 to 1928, after which he was succeeded by H. D. G. Leveson Gower. The following year, he was appointed Surrey's Honorary Treasurer, a role he held from 1929 until his death. He took up golf in later life. Longman died in his sleep at his Wimbledon Common residence on 19 August 1938, having been in apparent good health. He was survived by his wife, Mary, whom he had married in 1880; they had three children: two sons and a daughter. Their son, Henry, was also a first-class cricketer.
