= Exchange and Mart =

British classified advertising website

- Industry: Automotive trading via internet and mobile
- Founded: 1868; 158 years ago in Covent Garden, London
- Founder: Edward William Cox
- Headquarters: Bournemouth, England
- Key people: Dawn Sweeney (managing director)
- Products: Vehicle advertisements and dealer websites
- Owner: Newsquest
- Website: www.exchangeandmart.co.uk

Exchange and Mart is an online classified advertising website, owned by Newsquest Media Group. Exchange and Mart advertises new and used motor vehicles, including commercial vehicles, motorcycles, caravans and motorhomes offered by private sellers and motor retailers. It was a printed publication, offering any type of goods for sale, from 1868 until 2009.

== Background ==
Exchange and Mart was founded by news entrepreneur William Cox. In 1862 he had bought Queen, a magazine for women which had popular 'Exchange and Mart' columns allowing readers to buy and sell products. In May 1868 a weekly paper, Exchange & Mart, was founded by Cox from a converted potato warehouse in Covent Garden, the first paper of its type in the world. In 1926 Exchange and Mart was taken over by Bazaar Exchange & Mart Ltd.

By 1999 Exchange and Mart was owned by CMP Media, which was acquired by United News & Media (later UBM) for US$920 million.

In 2005, Newsquest's Exchange Enterprises division acquired Exchange & Mart and Auto Exchange from United Advertising Publications'. Exchange and Mart ceased printing a magazine in 2009, continuing to operate online.

== Printed magazine ==
The Exchange and Mart magazine was published weekly from 1868 to 2009. During World War II, the magazine was slimmed down by paper rationing; by 1948 it was still suffering under rationing, with a circulation of 70,000. At its peak, it reached an audited circulation of over 350,000.

A 1998 study described Exchange and Mart as a "well known and established paper", "hard edged, no nonsense", and popular for selling vehicles, a forerunner to later similar publications such as Loot.

However, in 2009 and with its final ABC Circulation figures (December 2007) at 21,754, Exchange and Mart ceased publishing the printed magazine, becoming available online only.

== Website ==
ExchangeandMart.co.uk was launched in 1996. Users could buy or sell vehicles and other items online. Today, the site advertises new and used motor vehicles. Users can search for vehicles using filters including price, model, postcode, age and mileage. The website also includes buying advice.

From 2012 Exchange and Mart also builds and hosts web and mobile sites for independent motor dealers selling online. The Exchange and Mart portal allows motor stock to be offered on a dealer's own Web site and other sites.

ExchangeandMart.co.uk was relaunched in 2016, together with a new strategy to utilise the Newsquest audience of 200 regional newspapers and 170 regional newspaper websites, which could reach 24.5 million visitors per month.

Exchange and Mart is invoked by a number of Newsquest-owned titles such as s1cars.com and the Warrington Guardian.

Exchange and Mart TV operated from 2003 to 2005. PetOwnersOnline.com was live from 2005 to 2006.

== Mobile ==
Exchange and Mart launched a version of its site optimised for mobile device users in 2011, and released an app in 2012 that allowed users to search for vehicles on mobile devices.
