= The Queen: The Ladies Newspaper and Court Chronicle =

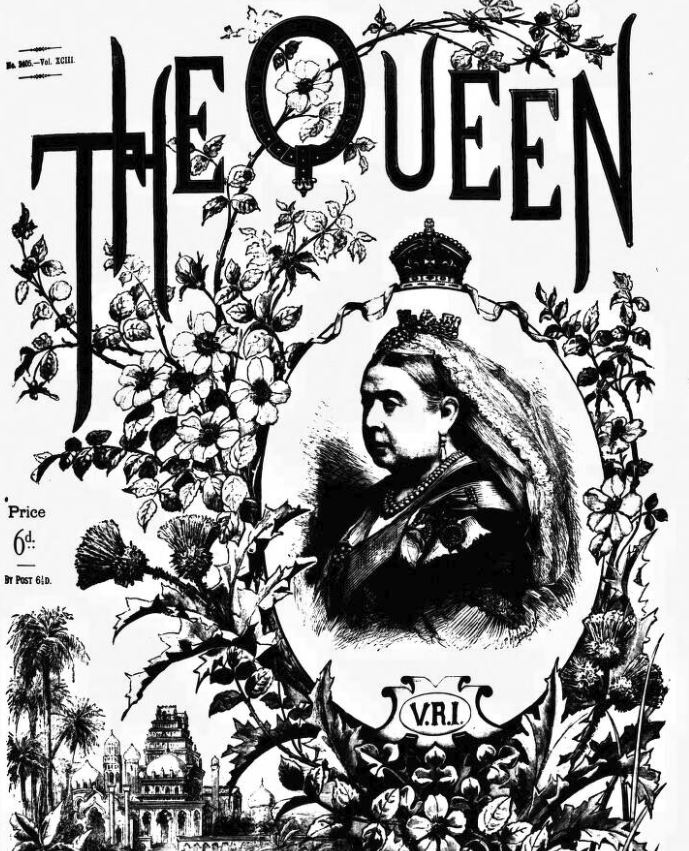
- "The Queen" on 28 January 1893
- Editor: Elizabeth Lowe; Ethel Deane ?
- Categories: lifestyle
- Frequency: Weekly
- Founded: 1864; 161 years ago, London
- Country: United Kingdom
- Based in: London
- Language: English

The Queen: The Ladies Newspaper and Court Chronicle or simply The Queen was a magazine created in 1864 in London. The title became Queen in the 1950s, then Harpers and Queen in the UK and then part of the British Harper's Bazaar.

== History ==
In 1861 Samuel Orchart Beeton ("Mrs Beeton"'s husband) had founded a paper named "The Queen" about fashion and culture for upper class women of society. Edward William Cox bought the title the following year and at the same time he bought the Queen's rival that was named "The Ladies' Paper". He merged the two publications into "The Queen: The Ladies Newspaper and Court Chronicle" in 1864. Elizabeth Lowe was offered the position of editor with Howard Cox (the owner's nephew) as overall manager of the enlarged magazine.

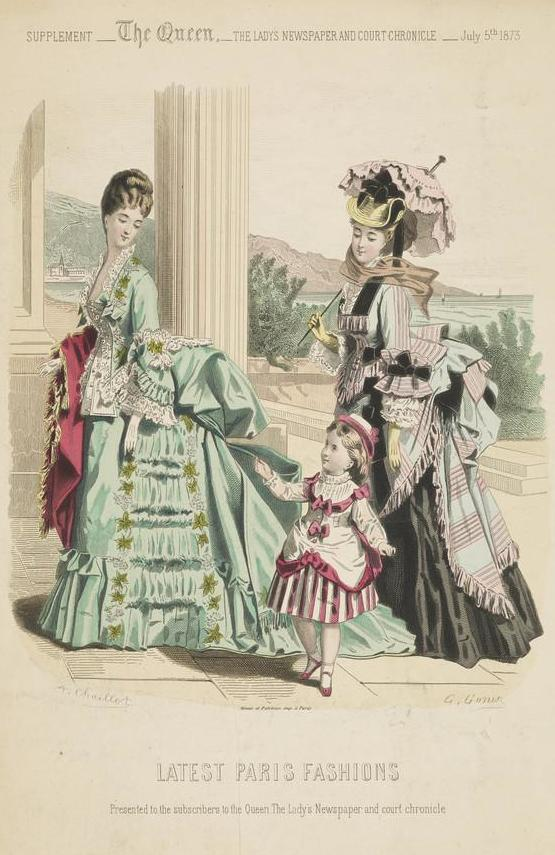
Paris Fashions in "The Queen, The Ladies Newspaper and Court Chronicle", 5th of July 1873

"The Queen" became Lowe's life's work. It grew from the sixteen pages to include colour plates, paper patterns as supplements and after she divided the page into sections the circulation grew. In time the magazine had 144 pages and this included ten pages of adverts which added to its commercial success. She achieved a scoop when "The Queen" included original sketches by "The Queen". Queen Victoria had her sketches included and there was also stories by princesses.

In June 1887 Queen Victoria's reign reached fifty years and in the issue that celebrated that event the publication lauded the achievement of Agnata Butler who was the only person to be placed in the top division of all the students taking the Classical Tripos that year.

When Lowe died in 1897, her job as editor went to Lowe's sister's daughter Ethel Deane. Deane later published "The Collector" which was a book containing reprints from recent editions of The Queen that could of continuing interest to collectors.

The title became "Queen" in the 1950s before merging into "Harpers and Queen" in the UK and in time that became part of the British Harpers Bazaar.
