= R v Birmingham City Council, ex p Equal Opportunities Commission =

UK legal case

R (EOC) v Birmingham City Council
- Court: House of Lords
- Citation: [1989] AC 1155; [1989] IRLR 173; [1989] 1 All ER 769; [1989] 2 WLR 520; 87 LGR 557; (1989) 86(15) LSG 36; (1989) 139 NLJ 292; (1989) 133 SJ 322; affirming [1988] 3 WLR 837; [1988] IRLR 430; 86 LGR 741; (1988) 152 LG Rev 1035

Keywords
- Education discrimination

R (Equal Opportunities Commission) v Birmingham City Council [1989] AC 1155 is a discrimination case, relevant for UK labour law case, concerning the appropriate comparisons that should be made.

== Facts ==
Birmingham only provided 360 grammar school places for girls, and 540 for boys. At first instance, the EOC won. The Court of Appeal upheld this. The Council appealed, arguing it had not shown that selective education was better than non-selective education as a precondition to showing less favourable treatment, and in any case the council had no intention or motivation to discriminate.

== Judgment ==
Lord Goff dismissed the council's appeal, saying first that it did not need to be shown that selective education was ‘better’, just that girls were not being given the same opportunities. Second, it is enough that there is less favourable treatment and the ‘intention or motive of the defendant to discriminate, though it may be relevant so far as remedies are concerned… is not a necessary condition to liability.’ That would be a bad idea because then ‘it would be a good defence for an employer to show that he discriminated against women not because he intended to do so but (for example) because of customer preference, or to save money, or even to avoid controversy.’

== See also ==
- UK labour law
- EU labour law
