= Farnborough Hill =

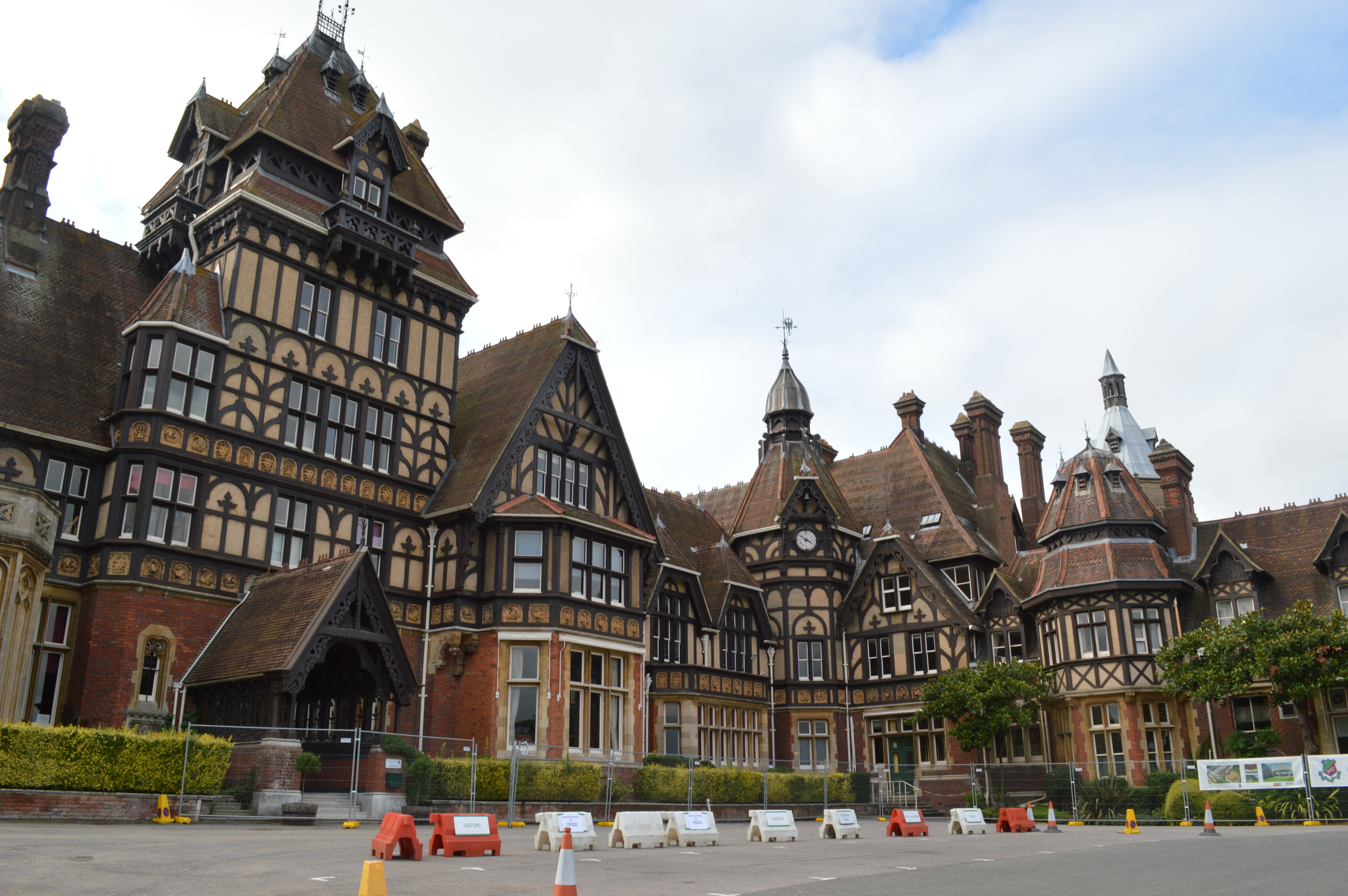

Location
- Farnborough, Hampshire, GU14 8AT; England; 51.3008°N 0.7504°W

Information
- Type: Private day school
- Motto: 'Wholeheartedly' & 'Educating The Whole Person'
- Religious affiliations: Roman Catholic & Religious of Christian Education
- Established: 1889
- Department for Education URN: 116517 Tables
- Ofsted: Reports
- Headmistress: Maria Young
- Gender: Girls
- Age: 11 to 18
- Enrolment: approx. 565
- Houses: Bickford (Howard) - Yellow; Dutertre (More) - Purple; McCormack (Fisher) - Pink (Red); Mostyn (Becket) - Green (Orange); Roantree (Campion) - Blue
- Colours: Green and Gold
- Website: http://www.farnborough-hill.org

Farnborough Hill is a Roman Catholic private day school located in Farnborough, Hampshire. The school educates girls aged 11–18. It was established by the Religious of Christian Education order of nuns in 1889 and moved to the current site when the order purchased the house and grounds in 1927. It is now set in an expansive park including Grade I Listed buildings.

== History ==
The house at Farnborough Hill was originally built for the publisher Thomas Longman by Henry Edward Kendall Jr. in 1860. Following Longman's death in 1879, the exiled Empress Eugénie, widow of Emperor Napoleon III of France, later bought and expanded the house in 1880.

The Napoleonic bee symbol can be seen in the internal and external decor of the building and is also present on the school badge. The Empress bought other land in Farnborough at around the same time and founded St Michael's Abbey as a mausoleum for her husband's body (relocated from its initial burial place in Chislehurst) and that of her recently deceased son the Prince Imperial who had died while serving with the British forces during the Anglo-Zulu War. The Empress was close friends with Queen Victoria and later became godmother to Victoria Eugénie of Battenberg, daughter of Princess Beatrice. The Empress died, age 94, in 1920.

The history of the school itself began in 1889 when the Religious of Christian Education established a convent boarding school in Farnborough nearby the hill on which the current school stands called Hillside Convent College and a day school called St Mary's. With the outbreak of war in 1915 the school buildings was commandeered resulting in the temporary closure of both schools. The religious community and Hillside school relocated to Sycamore House (also known as The Sycamores) which was expanded in 1916 to accommodate the reopened day school. At the end of the war the original school buildings were renovated and the school returned to Hillside Convent College in 1921, while the religious community remained at The Sycamores. The school continued to grow and Mother Roantree continued to search for alternative accommodation.

Following the death in 1926 of Prince Victor Boneparte, heir to the estate, the trustees of the estate put the house and grounds for sale. The community purchased the house at Farnborough Hill in 1927, both the school and Religious community moved into the House and the Sycamores was sold. The community commissioned Adrian Gilbert Scott to design additional school buildings which included the school chapel. Over the years there has been further expansion and development, most recently a new Sixth Form centre, all of it in keeping with this Grade One listed building. In 1994, the Religious of Christian Education transferred ownership to The Farnborough Hill Trust and the school is now under lay management and in 1996 appointed the school's first lay headmistress. In 2019 the school was involved in an industrial dispute over its intentions to withdraw from the Teacher’s Pension Scheme. The National Education Union claimed threats of “fire and rehire” had been made to staff. The school said that it had “followed the legal process for altering contracts of employment”. The school eventually withdrew from the Teacher’s Pension Scheme and now offers alternative pension arrangements.

== Headmistresses ==
- 1891–1927 Mother Roantree
- 1927–1935 Mother Mason
- 1935–1958 Mother Horan
- 1958–1973 Mother Rosemary Alexander
- 1973–1983 Sister Mary Dawson
- 1983–1986 Sister Sylvia Cousins
- 1986–1996 Sister Elizabeth McCormack
- 1996–1997 Miss Rita McGeogh
- 1997–2007 Miss Jacqueline Thomas
- 2007–2016 Mrs Sarah Buckle
- 2016–2023 Ms Alexandra Callaghan
- 2023-2024 Mrs Zoe Ireland (Acting)
- 2024–present Mrs Maria Young

== Facilities ==
The school has a mixture of historic and modern buildings. The house, built in Victorian times, is used for offices and teaching rooms. The school chapel was built in 1932, a classroom block was opened in 1953 and further extensions to teaching facilities were added in the 1960s including a gymnasium and science laboratories. The school has continued to expand and develop its facilities. The Alexander Sports Hall was opened in 2005 and the swimming pool refurbished, new art studios and refurbished laboratories were opened in 2009 and the gymnasium was converted to a theatre, 'Theatre on the Hill'. The St Joseph's Courtyard development, incorporating a large multi-purpose building that includes a dance studio, a new geography classroom, a Sixth Form science laboratory and a new science office, was completed in 2011. A new music suite, St Cecilia's, was opened in 2014, and a Sixth Form centre in 2023.

Farnborough Hill is set in 65 acres of parkland and uses much of this for sports including tennis, hockey, netball, football, rounders, athletics and cross-country. In 2015 the Alex Danson Pitch, an all-weather, flood-lit hockey pitch was opened. Two bee hives were introduced to the site in 2022.

Farnborough Hill's use of information technology has also developed during this time with the adoption of electronic whiteboards in every classroom, music technology facilities and Farnborough Hill's own radio station, 'F'Hill Radio', and podcast, 'UnFHilltered'.

== Extracurricular activities ==
A wide range of extracurricular activities are on offer from Sport, Music and Drama to Sixth Form Expeditions and trips abroad.

== Old Girls' Association ==
Alumnae, known as Old Girls, are very much a part of school life and Farnborough Hill has an active old girls' association. A reunion is held every year and other events are arranged during the year.

== Notable former pupils ==
- Raquel Cassidy, English actress
- Alex Danson, England and GB hockey player, gold medallist in the 2016 Rio Olympics and bronze medallist in the 2012 London Olympics
- Dame Helen Ghosh, Director General of the National Trust and former British civil servant
- Fidelis Morgan, actress and author
- Anne Robinson, English television presenter and journalist
- Helene Raynsford, British rower who competed at the 2008 Summer Paralympics
- Juliet Aubrey, English actress
- Rose Keegan, English actress
- Charlotte Purdue, British runner
