= Desmond O'Neill =

British photographer

Desmond O'Neill (14 February 1923 – 8 May 2003) was a British photographer associated with the high society and jet set, working for such publications as Queen and Tatler.

O'Neill served with the British Army's Army Film and Photography Unit, he crossed the channel on LCT853 and went ashore at Sword on D-Day during the Second World War. He was shot in the arm soon after landing and was returned to Gosport. O'Neill also established a photographic agency, Desmond O'Neill Features, which he ran with his son, Dominic.
