= Thomas Longman (1804–1879) =

English publisher (1804–1879)

Thomas Longman (né Thomas Norton Longman IV; 22 December 1804 – 30 August 1879 Farnborough, Hampshire, England) was the head of the London publishing house Longman, while in charge he oversaw the publication of a sumptuous art book containing images of many of the great masters. Longman also published works by the Whig historian Lord Macaulay, works by the philosopher John Stuart Mill and novels by Benjamin Disraeli who was a prominent Victorian politician who became Prime Minister,

== Biography ==
Longman eldest son of Thomas Norton Longman (1771–1842), was born on 22 December 1802. He was educated at Glasgow University, and at an early age began his career in the publishing house of Longman. In 1832 he became a partner in it, and in 1842 he succeeded his father as its head.

Apart from the ordinary business of the firm, Longman devoted much attention to the preparation of a sumptuous work, which was produced under his special superintendence, The New Testament of Our Lord and Saviour Jesus Christ – With Engravings on Wood After Paintings by Fra Angelico, Pietro Perugino, Francesco Francia, Lorenzo di Credi, Fra Bartolommeo, Titian, Raphael, Gaudenzio Ferrari, Daniele di Volterra, and other great Masters, chiefly of the Early Italian School. The first edition, consisting of 250 copies only, at ten guineas each, was sold on the day of publication. A second and less costly edition was issued in 1864, and reprinted in 1883.

Longman was chairman of the fund raised by "the trade" in London and the provinces for the relief of the booksellers of Paris during the siege by the Germans in 1870. Of the general operations of the firm while he was its head one of the most notable was the publication of Lord Macaulay's works, especially the History of England, for his share of the profits of the third and fourth volumes of which the author received, and that merely as a payment on account, the famous cheque for £20,000 (equivalent to £1,862,254 in 2025), dated 13 March 1856.

In 1863 the firm purchased the business and stock of John William Parker (1791–1870), the publisher of West Strand, London, with which it acquired many valuable or interesting copyrights, among them that of the works of John Stuart Mill and Fraser's Magazine. In 1870 Longman purchased the copyrights of Benjamin Disraeli's novels, including Lothair.

Longman commissioned Henry Edward Kendall (1805–1885) to design Farnborough Hill – a prominent mid-Victorian, Gothic-style mansion in Hamshire, completed in 1863. Following Longman's death in 1879, the estate was, in 1880, purchased by the exiled Empress Eugénie, widow of Napoleon III, who expanded it.

Longman died 30 August 1879, and left two sons, Thomas Norton Longman who followed his father and became head of the firm, and George Longman. He was the author of a pamphlet, published in 1872, Some Observations on Copyright and Our Colonies [With Special Reference to Canada].

== Bibliography ==
=== References ===
- Briggs, Asa (1921–2016) (2008). A History of Longmans and Their Books, 1724–1990 – Longevity in Publishing. The British Library and Oak Knoll Press. p. 229. LCCN 2008-47337; ISBN 978-0-7123-4873-7, 0-7123-4873-5 (The British Library), ISBN 978-1-5845-6234-4 (Oak Knoll Press); OCLC 231724433 (all editions).
1. Via Internet Archive.
- Briggs, Asa (26 May 2005). "Longman family". Oxford Dictionary of National Biography (online ed.). Oxford University Press. doi:10.1093/ref:odnb/72356. (Subscription, Wikipedia Library access or UK public library membership required.)

=== Dictionary of National Biography references ===
- DNB – Dictionary of National Biography (1885–1901). Sidney Lee (1859–1926), ed. London: Smith, Elder & Co. LCCN 03-12075.
1. Espinasse, Francis (1823–1912). Vol. 34 (1893): "Llwyd–MacCartney". → Eɴᴛʀʏ: "Longman, Thomas (1804–1879)". p. 124.
  1. Via Wikisource . (Stanford).
  2. Via Internet Archive (Mills College; withdrawn).
The original version of this article was derived largely from the article in this citation (Dictionary of National Biography). This article may still incorporate text from that publication, which is now in the public domain.
References in the body of Espinasse's DNB article:
- Trevelyan, George Otto (1838–1928) (1877). Life and Letters of Lord Macaulay (2 Vols.). The author was a nephew of Lord Macaulay. New York: Harper Brothers. LCCN 08-31287, LCCN 04-21969, LCCN 04-17202, OCLC 3941616 (all editions).
1. Vol. 2. Chapter 14: "1856–1858".
  1. Via Internet Archive (UC Santa Barbara). 1876. p. 345.
  2. Via Internet Archive (Bryn Athyn College). 1877. p. 345.
  3. Via HathiTrust (University of Iowa) (Leipsic ed.). 1876. p. 266.
  4. Via Internet Archive (Cornell) (Leipsic ed.). 1877. p. 266.
Note: The page reference given at page 124 (Vol. 24) in the DNB ("1877 ed., ii. 413–414") could not be verified in the digitized 1877 editions consulted, whose corresponding pages comprise the volume index. The cited passage concerning the £20,000 cheque appears elsewhere in those editions.
References at the foot of Espinasse's DNB article:
- Athenæum, (The). London.
1. "Mr. William Longman" (obituary). No. 2599. 18 August 1877. p. 213 – via Internet Archive: SIM Box ID IA1533605, Canister no. 04. SIM (Serials in Microfilm); Periodicals; Pub Athenaeum UK.
2. "Mr. Thomas Longman" (obituary). No. 2706. 6 September 1879. pp. 306–307 – via Internet Archive: SIM Box ID IA1533605, Canister no. 04. SIM (Serials in Microfilm); Periodicals; Pub Athenaeum UK.
- Critic (The), "Histories of Publishing Houses" (series), 10, Wellington Street, Strand, London, W.C., Middlesex: Printed and published by John Crockford (1823–1865) LCCN sf98-94325; ISSN 2043-2607; OCLC 7233446 (all editions).
1. Espinasse, Francis (1823–1912). No. II: "The House of Longman".
  1. March 24, 1660. Chapter 1: "Thomas Longman and the Founder – Lombard-Street and Paternoster-Row, 1716–55". Vol. 20, whole no. 507. pp. 366–372 – via Internet Archive: SIM Box ID IA1519119, Canister no. 03. SIM (Serials in Microfilm); Periodicals; Pub Critic.
  2. April 7, 1860. Chapter 2: "After the Founder – Paternoster-Row, 1755–1860". Vol. 20, whole no. 509. pp. 431–436 – via Internet Archive: SIM Box ID IA1519119, Canister no. 03. SIM (Serials in Microfilm); Periodicals; Pub Critic.
  3. April 21, 1860. Chapter 2: "After the Founder – Paternoster-Row, 1755–1860" (continued). Vol. 20, whole no. 511. pp. 483–486 – via Internet Archive: SIM Box ID IA1519119, Canister no. 03. SIM (Serials in Microfilm); Periodicals; Pub Critic.
- Fraser's Magazine; Reeve, Henry (1813–1895) (October 1877), "William Longman – In Memorandum", New Series, vol. 16, no. 94, pp. 417–421 – via Internet Archive: SIM Box ID IA1631802, Canister no. 05. SIM (Serials in Microfilm); Periodicals; Pub Fraser's Magazine
- Publishers' Circular and General Record of British and Foreign Literature (The) ["Containing a Complete Alphabetical List of All New Works Published in Great Britain and Every Work of Interest Published Abroad"]. London: Sampson Low (1797–1886) (publisher). Spottiswoode & Co. (printer).
1. "William Longman (obituary). Vol. 40, no. 958. 16 August 1877. p. 581 – via Google Books (Austrian National Library).
2. "The Late Mr. William Longman (obituary). Vol. 40, no. 959. 1 September 1877. pp. 605–606 – via Google Books (Austrian National Library).
3. "Thomas Longman (obituary). Vol. 42, no. 1008. 16 September 1879. p. 718 – via HathiTrust (New York Public Library).

=== General references ===
- Athenæum, (The). London.
1. Douglas, Anne, Countess of Morton (1610–1654) (1665) [1st re-print: 1848]. The Countess of Moreton's Daily Exercise, Or, A Book of Prayers and Rules. OCLC 828695400 (all editions).
- Publishers' Circular and General Record of British and Foreign Literature (The).
1. "William Longman (obituary). Vol. 40, no. 958. 16 August 1877. p. 581 – via Google Books (Austrian National Library).
- Publishers' Weekly (The) ["A Journal Specially Devoted to the Interests of the Book and Stationery Trade – With Which is Incorporated the 'American Literary Gazette and Publishers' Circular"].
1. "William Longman (obituary). Vol. 12, no. 9 (whole no. 294). 1 September 1877. p. 212 – via HathiTrust (Cal Berkeley).
2. "A Publisher Worth of Honor" (William Longman). Vol. 12, no. 16 (whole no. 301). 20 October 1877. pp. 465–466 – via HathiTrust (Cal Berkeley).
3. "Personal Mention" – "Thomas Longman". Vol. 16, nos. 10 & 11 (whole nos. 399 & 400). 6 September 1879. p. 259 – via Google Books (Michigan).
4. "Some Interesting Historical Gossip Regarding the Longman Firm". Vol. 16, no. 15 (whole no. 404). 11 October 1879. p. 451 – via Google Books (Michigan).
