= Cox's Criminal Cases =

Series of English law reports

Cox's Criminal Cases are a series of law reports of cases decided from 1843 to 26 June 1941.

They were published in 31 volumes from 1846 to 1948. They were then incorporated in the Times Law Reports.

For the purpose of citation, their name may be abbreviated to "Cox CC", "CCC" or "Cox".

The series was established by E.W. Cox and T.W. Saunders.

== See also ==
List of main criminal law texts in England and Wales
