= George Harris (barrister) =

George Harris (1809–1890) was an English barrister and judge, known as a biographer and legal writer.

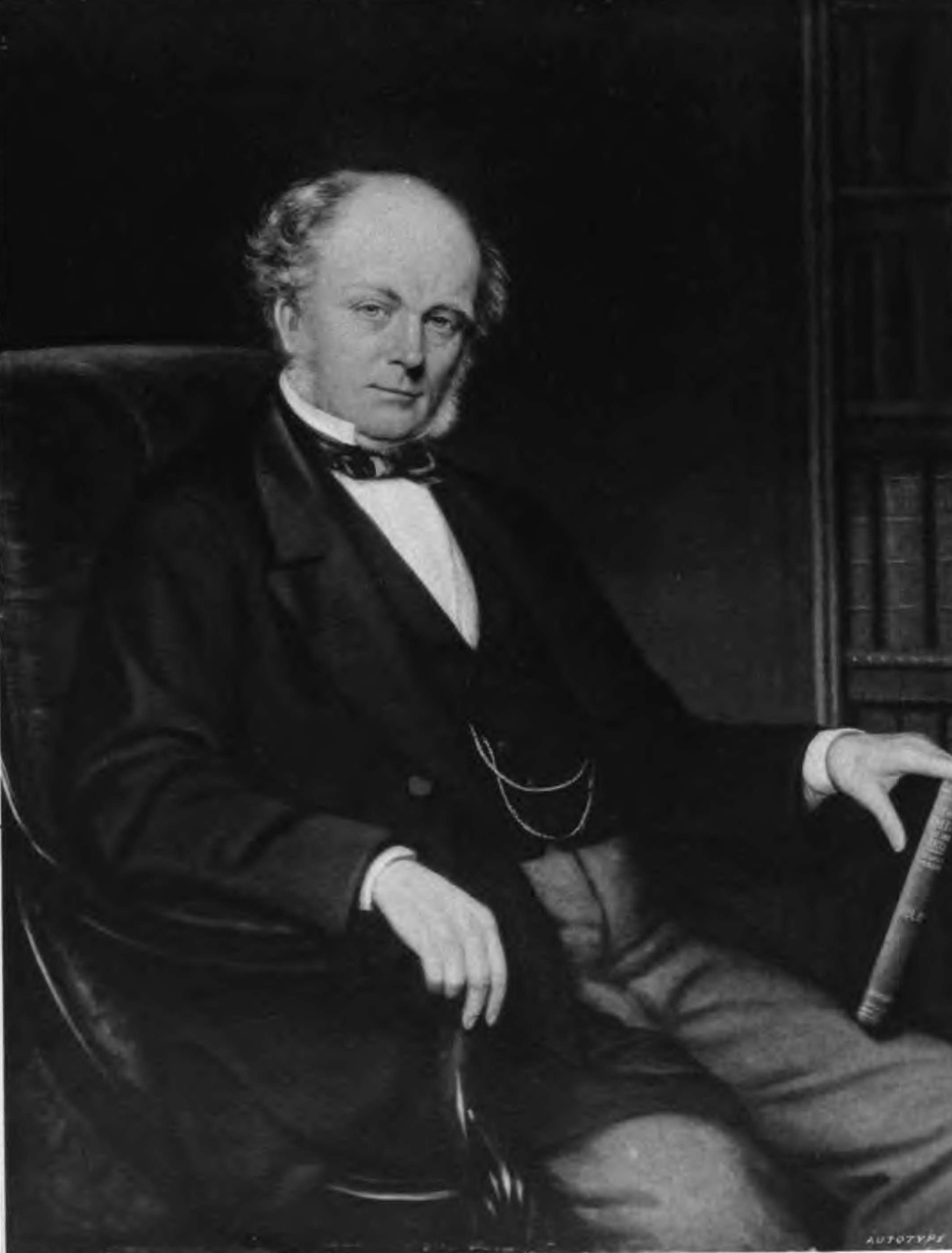
George Harris

== Early life ==
Born at Rugby on 6 May 1809, he was the eldest son of George Harris (d. 16 January 1856), a solicitor of that town, by his wife Christabella, only daughter of Rear-admiral William Chambers (d. 28 September 1829). On 6 May 1820 he entered Rugby School. He found the school rough, and left to join HMS Spartiate, the flagship of Admiral Sir George Eyre, as a midshipman; but falling ill before it sailed, he gave up the idea of entering the Royal Navy. After a bad time at a private school at Totnes in Devon he was articled to his father in 1825. In 1832 he was admitted as attorney, and in January 1834 became a partner in his father's firm. On 22 June 1838, however, he left Rugby and moved to London.

After little more than a year in London, during which he wrote for the British and Foreign Review and other journals, and entered Trinity Hall, Cambridge, Harris took the post of editor of the Hull Times on 11 September 1839. An attack on the Hull railway line led to his resignation on 21 September 1840

== Legal career ==
Harris entered the Middle Temple in December 1839, and was called to the bar on 13 January 1843. He went the Midland circuit, but did not obtain a good practice. Having lost money in railway speculations, and spent time writing, he had money troubles, solved by his marriage in 1848.

In April 1853, Harris filled the office of deputy court judge of the Bristol district, and early in 1861 he became acting judge of the county court at Birmingham. In 1862, he was appointed registrar of the court of bankruptcy at Manchester, a post which he retained until 1868, when ill-health compelled him to retire on a pension.

== Later life ==
Harris was an active member of the Anthropological Society of London, and in 1871 was chosen a vice-president, a position which he retained on the formation of the Anthropological Institute in that year from the Anthropological Society and the Ethnological Society of London. In an essay Plurality of Races, and the Distinctive Character of the Adamite Species he defended polygenism, against biblical monogenism. He also supported biological determinism of human intellectual capacities by gender.

In 1876 Harris joined Edward William Cox in founding the Psychological Society, a group interested in psychical research, of which he became a vice-president. He was also a Fellow of the Society of Antiquaries of London. J. W. Burrow commented that Harris was "better described as a polymath and autodidact than an antiquary".

Harris died at Northolt in Middlesex on 15 November 1890, at his residence Iselipps, an old manor-house that he had bought and enlarged.

== Works ==
In 1847 Harris published his Life of Lord-chancellor Hardwicke (London, 3 vols.), dedicated to Albert, Prince Consort. It was a critical but not a commercial success.

In 1868 Harris lost a friend and patron by the death of Lord Brougham. He contributed a Memoir of Brougham, with personal recollections, to the Law Magazine and Review, and it was separately published in 1868. In 1876 he brought out his Philosophical Treatise on the Nature and Constitution of Man (London, 2 vols.), on which he had been working for most of his life. In 1888 he issued an Autobiography for private circulation, mainly extracts from his diary kept from 1832, and with a preface by his friend Benjamin Ward Richardson.

Harris also wrote:

- The True Theory of Representation in a State, London, 1852; 2nd edit. 1857.
- Civilization considered as a Science, in relation to its Essence, its Elements, and its End, London, 1861; 2nd ed. 1872.
- Principia Prima Legum; or, an Examination and Analysis of the Elementary Principles of Law, London, 1865 (only part i. published).
- The Theory of the Arts; or, Art in relation to Nature, Civilization, and Man, London, 1869, 2 vols.
- Supernatural Phenomena: Tests adapted to determine the Truth of Supernatural Phenomena, London, 1874.

Harris contributed papers to the Journal of the Anthropological Society and to Modern Thought. He wrote legal biographies for the Law Magazine and Law Review, including those of Lord Westbury, Lord Cranworth, Lord-chief-baron Pollock, and Lord Wensleydale.

== Manuscripts commission ==
Harris proposed an official commission, to investigate and catalogue manuscripts of historical interest in private collections. In 1857 he first brought forward his idea in a paper read at Birmingham in October before the Law Amendment Society, The Manuscript Treasures of this Country, and the best Means of rendering them available, published in the Transactions of the National Association for the Promotion of Social Science, of which Harris was an original member. He suggested the formation of a committee for the purpose of cataloguing and arranging manuscripts in private hands. The project was taken up by Lord Brougham, and Harris himself pushed for it.

A memorial was presented to Lord Palmerston on 9 July 1859 by a deputation with Harris as spokesman. Palmerston was interested, but the project met with opposition. The Historical Manuscripts Commission was set up 2 April 1869, after which the work proceeded. Harris, however, had little or no connection with the project after 1859.

== Family ==
On 12 December 1848 Harris married at Bathwick Church, Bath, Elizabeth, only surviving child of George Innes (died 17 July 1842), master of the King's School, Warwick and rector of Hilperton in Wiltshire.

== Notes ==
Attribution

This article incorporates text from a publication now in the public domain: Lee, Sidney, ed. (1901). "Harris, George (1809-1890)". Dictionary of National Biography (1st supplement). Vol. 2. London: Smith, Elder & Co.
