= Francis Espinasse =

Scottish journalist

Francis Espinasse (1823–1912) was a Scottish journalist and follower of Thomas Carlyle.

== Life ==
Espinasse came from a Gascon French background. He was born in Edinburgh, and studied at Edinburgh University. As a young man, he was warned against life as a man of letters by Francis Jeffrey and William Wordsworth.

Espinasse went to London in 1843, to work for the British Museum as an assistant; but he left his post after a clash with Anthony Panizzi. He became close to the Carlyles, and Thomas Carlyle supported his career, which took him to Manchester and back to Edinburgh. He published on 20 October 1847 in the Manchester Examiner an article on Ralph Waldo Emerson, who was starting out on a British lecture tour, in terms which set a pattern for later coverage. When the Lancashire Public School Association was set up in 1848, he became its secretary, assisted by Edwin Waugh. In 1849 he was promoting the memory of Joseph Arkwright in a lecture at the Manchester Mechanics' Institute.

A prolific freelance writer, Espinasse became a major contributor to The Critic in the early 1850s, introduced by William Maccall. Under the pseudonym Herodotus Smith he gave an insider's view of the literary world (other pseudonyms—he used at least three—were Lucian Paul and Frank Grave). He edited the Edinburgh Evening Courant from 1864 to 1867, taking over when James Hannay moved to London, and being replaced by the new owner, Charles Wescomb, by James Scot Henderson.

The long-lived Espinasse was in the end thought of as "the Nestor of Victorian journalism". He was remembered as a biographer of French philosophers, and substantial contributor to the Dictionary of National Biography (he is one of those credited with its conception). He became a Poor Brother of the London Charterhouse, supplying a pension.

== Works ==
- Life and Times of François-Marie Arouet, calling himself Voltaire, 3 vols., 1866
- Lancashire Worthies (2 vols.)
- Literary Recollections and Sketches, 1893
- Life of Renan, 1895
