= Counsel (journal) =

Monthly legal journal

- Type: Monthly (12 issues)
- Format: Journal
- Owner: Published by LexisNexis on behalf of the Bar Council
- Editor: Sarah Grainger; Commissioning editor: Elsa Booth
- Founded: 1985
- Headquarters: Halsbury House, 35 Chancery Lane, London WC2A 1EL, UK
- ISSN: 0268-3784

Counsel is the monthly journal of the General Council of the Bar of England and Wales. As the Bar Council's own magazine, it is largely written by and for barristers. It covers issues facing the bar and legal system, in addition to profiles, conference reports, personal finance, arts reviews, chambers' announcements and the "agony uncle" column for lighter moments.

== Features ==
Counsel's analysis and opinion informs readers of changes to the legal services market. Editorial coverage focuses on legal and professional issues, together with news, letters, profiles, lifestyle and personal finance features, book and theatre reviews, chambers' announcements and tenancy vacancies, and satirical content.

== History ==
The journal was founded in 1985.

== Circulation ==
The magazine is distributed to barristers who pay their voluntary member services subscription to the Bar Council.

== See also ==
- Corporate Rescue and Insolvency
- Construction Law
- Criminal Law & Justice Weekly
