= New Law Journal =

Weekly legal magazine for legal professionals

- Editor: Jan Miller
- Categories: Legal magazine
- Frequency: Weekly (48 issues)
- Founded: 1822
- Company: LexisNexis
- Country: United Kingdom
- Based in: London
- ISSN: 0306-6479

New Law Journal (NLJ) is a British weekly legal magazine for legal professionals, first published in 1822. It provides information on case law, legislation and changes in practice. It is funded by subscription and generally available to most of the legal profession.

== History ==
It was established in 1822 as Law Journal. It was amalgamated with Law Times to become New Law Journal in 1965. From 1947 to 1965 Butterworths published two weekly journals – the Law Journal and the Law Times. These were different in style and readership, but there was a strong case for rationalisation. Largely at the urging of Richard Millett when he was chairman, the two were amalgamated at the New Law Journal. Tom Harper, till the then the editors of the Law Society Gazette, agreed to become the first editor of the new journal. Jan Miller became editor of the journal at the end of 2007.

== Features ==
Each issue of NLJ normally contains about 25 pages of editorial, as well as advertising and regular directories of legal service providers. Contributors and key legal figures provide expert commentary and opinion in comment, speakers' corner and law in the headlines sections.

Published weekly (48 issues per year), there are also additional bound-in directories and supplements over the year. NLJ also offers lawyers a way to earn their continuing professional development points.

== Readership ==
Although it is a commercial magazine written primarily for practicing lawyers, New Law Journal is also read extensively by academics.

== See also ==
- Herbert Bentwich (1856–1932), owner/editor of the Law Journal for many years
- Butterworths Journal of International Banking and Financial Law
- Corporate Rescue and Insolvency
- Counsel
- Justice of the Peace
- Justice of the Peace Reports
- Tolley's Employment Law Newsletter
