= William Maccall =

William Maccall (1812–1888) was a Scottish author and Unitarian minister.

== Life ==
Born at Largs, Ayrshire, on 23 February 1812, he was eldest son of John Maccall, a tradesman, and his wife Elizabeth Murdoch. He was intended for the Presbyterian ministry of the Secession Church, and entered Glasgow University in 1827, graduating M.A. in 1833. George Harris was an early influence. He then passed two years in a theological academy at Geneva, but, convinced by Unitarianism, he joined its ministry. He took a position at Greenock, obtained for him by Harris.

Maccall officiated at Bolton, Lancashire (1837–1840), where he was a Chartist opposed to Feargus O'Connor. He had taken on the Moor Lane Chapel congregation founded by Harris, but it dwindled away. He was then at Crediton in Devon (1841–6). He eventually resigned his ministry to concentrate on writing and lecturing.

Coming to London in 1846, Maccall lived first at 4 Carburton Street, and preached, lectured, and wrote for the press. John Stuart Mill gave him introductions to The Spectator and The Critic; he wrote also for the Gentleman's Magazine. The Royal Literary Fund gave Maccall a grant in 1853. He used the pseudonym Atticus, reviewing Ralph Waldo Emerson in The Critic in 1860.

In January 1854, Maccall established the Brotherhood of the Religious Life and took on the role of president. This association was founded upon three principles: "1. That there is a God; 2. That the religious sentiment is eternal; 3. That God supplied the religious sentiment in all ages with suitable and sufficient food." The main object of Brotherhood meetings, which ceased in the mid-1860s, was to "To cultivate and feed the sense of the divine life and the divine love in each brother's soul." The Brotherhood sought to do this by meeting on Sunday mornings to contemplate the lives of holy men and study sacred, mystical, devotional, and philosophical books from across the world. Members were expected to endeavour to be "a living gospel in the midst of men."

Later Maccall lived in the suburbs of London, and in 1861 settled at Bexley Heath. In 1864 he became the major contributor to the Propagandist and Theological, Social and Political Review, founded by the secularist John Bagnall Bebbington in May of that year, and running to October. The eclectic content drew on Charles Hennell, and Maccall's translations from Ludwig Büchner and Scandinavian writers. Also in 1864 he was writing in the National Reformer, to advocate a National Land League. In the late 1870s he was a frequent contributor of prose and poetry to The Secular Chronicle, edited by Harriet Law. An autobiographical sketch accompanied by a portrait appeared on the front page of The Secular Chronicle in 1878, with a note from Harriet T. Law praising "his brilliant abilities, his brave and noble life, and his long and honourable connection with the Secular Party". However, Timothy Larsen has identified some ambivalence towards Maccall within the freethought circle around George Holyoake, which placed him as a pantheist, rather than an atheist.

Maccall died on 19 November 1888. He had had constant financial troubles.

== Works ==
Maccall published:

- The Agents of Civilization, London, 1843.
- The Education of Taste, 1846.
- The Elements of Individualism, 1847.
- National Missions, 1855.
- Foreign Biographies, 2 vols. 1873.
- The Newest Materialism, 1873.
- Russian Hymns, 1879; a collection of anti-Russian ballads originally published in The Secular Chronicle (1877).
- Christian Legends, 1881.
- Moods and Memories, 1885, verse.

His views on individualism, central to his thought, were developed in compact form while he was preaching in Crediton, in 1845–6. Mill considered Maccall a precursor to views he expressed in On Liberty (1859).

Maccall also translated the Tractatus Politicus of Spinoza, 1854 (for "The Cabinet of Reason"), Charles Letourneau's Biology, London, 1877, and pamphlets.

== Family ==
Maccall married on 3 March 1842 Alice, daughter of John Haselden of Bolton. She died on 17 April 1878, and left a daughter, Elizabeth.

== Notes ==
Attribution

This article incorporates text from a publication now in the public domain: Lee, Sidney, ed. (1893). "Maccall, William". Dictionary of National Biography. Vol. 34. London: Smith, Elder & Co.
