= Paterson's Practical Statutes =

The Practical Statutes of the Session, later called Paterson's Practical Statutes, was published from 1850 onwards and included annotated copies of Acts of the Parliament of the United Kingdom passed between 1849 and 1943.

The Practical Statutes of the Session 1849 was published in 1853 and edited by Charles John Belcher Hertslet. The Practical Statutes of the Session 1850 was published in 1850 and edited by Edward William Cox and William Paterson. Other editors included James Sutherland Cotton, William de Bracy Herbert and A L Malcolm.

== Volumes ==
- Practical Statutes of the Session 1850
- Practical Statutes of the Session 1856
- Practical Statutes of the Session 1858
- Practical Statutes of the Session 1861
- Practical Statutes of the Session 1864
- Practical Statutes of the Session 1885
- Practical Statutes of the Session 1887
- Practical Statutes of the Session 1888, Parts I and II
- Practical Statutes of the Session 1889
- Practical Statutes of the Session 1890
- Practical Statutes of the Session 1891
- Practical Statutes of the Session 1892
- Practical Statutes of the Session 1893, Parts I and II
- Practical Statutes of the Session 1894
- Practical Statutes of the Session 1895
- Practical Statutes of the Session 1896
- Practical Statutes of the Session 1897
- Practical Statutes of the Session 1898
- Practical Statutes of the Session 1908
- Practical Statutes of the Session 1909
- Practical Statutes of the Session 1910
- Practical Statutes of the Session 1911
- Practical Statutes of the Session 1912-1913
- Practical Statutes of the Session 1923
