= Long Man (disambiguation) =

Long Man is a civil parish in East Sussex, England.

Long Man may also refer to:

- Cantwell Fada, a 14th century effigy of a knight in County Kilkenny, Ireland
- Long Man of Wilmington, a hill figure in East Sussex, England

== See also ==
- Longman (disambiguation)
