= Elizabeth Lowe =

- Born: 18 May 1829; Liverpool
- Died: 1 June 1897 (aged 68); London
- Occupation: Editor of "The Queen"

Elizabeth Lowe (18 May 1829 – 1 June 1897) was an English journalist and newspaper editor. She edited The Queen: The Ladies Newspaper and Court Chronicle for thirty years.

== Life ==
Lowe was born in Liverpool in 1829. Her parents were Elizabeth (born Parry) and James Lowe and her father was a solicitor who died when she was a young girl. Her elder brother James and her younger sister enjoying a good home education realised by tutors. Her brother started work early but she was allowed three years touring on the continent before she returned to start work. By this time her brother was an experienced journalist and he was editing "The Critic" magazine which was owned by Serjeant Cox . James gave her an inside track to a job reviewing art for the magazine supplying training and advice.

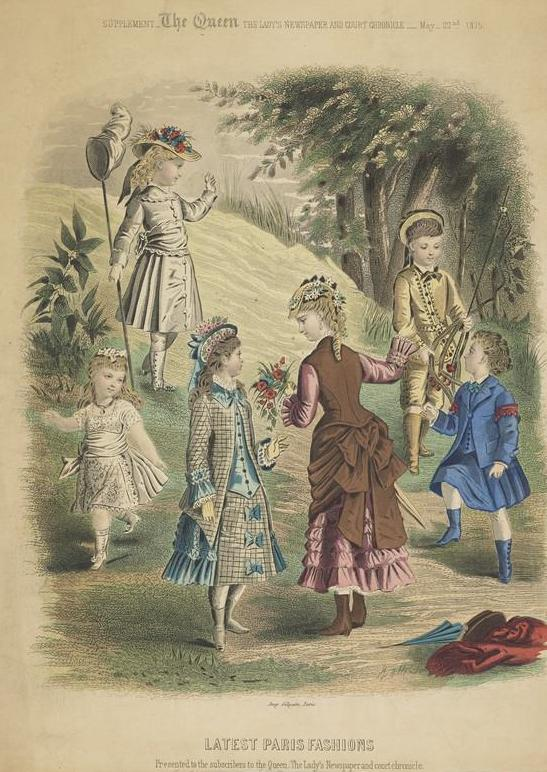
Latest Paris fashions in 1875 from "The Queen"

Samuel Orchart Beeton (Isabella Beetons husband) had founded a paper named "The Queen" in 1861 about fashion and culture for upper-class women of society. A year later Edward William Cox bought the title in and he bought its rival named "The Ladies' Paper". He merged the two into "The Queen: The Ladies Newspaper and Court Chronicle" in 1864. Lowe was offered the position of editor with Howard Cox (the owner's nephew) as overall manager of the enlarged magazine.

"The Queen" became her life's work, and her one achievement. She spent a great deal of time answering letters in The Queen but she did not reveal (or have) views about politics or religion. She did not give interviews or attend events. On Sundays she would receive visitors at her home but politics would not be discussed. When women were given the vote in New Zealand in 1897 she noted that it was a good idea. However she predicted that when British women were allowed to vote that this would not cause radical change. She said "it is probable that [women voting] will not produce the effects that are hoped for by its promoters and apprehended by its adversaries."

The Queen grew from the sixteen pages it had when she became editor to include colour plates, paper patterns as supplements and after she divided the page into sections the circulation grew. In time the magazine had 144 pages and this included ten pages of adverts which added to its commercial success. She achieved a scoop when "The Queen" included original sketches by "The Queen". Queen Victoria had her sketches included and there was stories by princesses.

Lowe died in 1897 and her job as editor was taken by her niece, Ellen Deane.
