= Henry Longman =

English cricketer

Henry Kerr Longman (8 March 1881 – 7 October 1958) was an English first-class cricketer active 1901–21 who played for Middlesex, Surrey, Marylebone Cricket Club (MCC) and Cambridge University. He was born in Kensington; died in Woking.
