= The Law Society Gazette =

British weekly legal magazine for solicitors in England and Wales

- Type: Weekly (48 issues)
- Format: Magazine
- Owner(s): Law Society of England and Wales
- Founded: 1903
- Headquarters: 19 Bell Yard, London WC2A 2JR, UK
- ISSN: 0262-1495
- Website: www.lawgazette.co.uk

The Law Society Gazette (also known as the Gazette or the Law Gazette) is a British weekly legal magazine for solicitors in England and Wales published by the Law Society of England and Wales.

While it is available to buy and on subscription, it is provided to all solicitors with a current England and Wales practising certificate (as well as trainee solicitors). This makes its position different from other British legal periodicals such as The Lawyer, Legal Week, Solicitors Journal, New Law Journal, Legal Business, In-House Lawyer and European Lawyer.

In consequence the Gazette has by far the highest audited circulation of any legal journal in the United Kingdom (latest ABC-audited numbers are a circulation of 81,178 for June 2019). It is also the largest-circulation legal magazine in Europe.

The lawgazette.co.uk website has 21,097 daily unique browsers and the Gazette Daily Update gets emailed to 182,195 recipients every weekday around lunchtime.

== Format and channels ==
The Gazette has changed its format over the years, beginning as a small booklet before experimenting with an untrimmed newspaper style in 1975, in a bid to cut costs and to use the additional space to publish its backlog of material. It was then a more manageable A4-ish size until May 2018 where it was re-designed and is now styled like a magazine, with more analytical content than before.

Online, the Gazette's brand ranges across two websites – the Gazette's editorial element at Lawgazette.co.uk and the Gazette's legal jobs board at jobs.lawgazette.co.uk.

The content mix on the Lawgazette.co.uk site is legal news, blogs, user comments, feature-length material, updates on specific areas of the law, user-generated listings of job moves within the profession and issues around the management of law firms.

== History ==
The Gazette was the creation of the Law Society's Registry Department as a way to communicate between the Society's members for the negotiation of sales, mortgages, partnerships and clerkships. By 1900, the Registry had also begun to amass brief notices about professional issues affecting solicitors, which the Law Society's Council felt would be of use and interest to the Society's membership. The Gazette and Register was launched in November 1903 as a convenient method to communicate this information to the Society's members.

Initially it was published on a monthly basis and was only available to members of the Society. In its very first issue, the Society encouraged its members to contribute to the ‘General Information’ section with the instructions that contributions must be "strictly confined to matters of fact of general professional interest, and must not contain expressions of opinion or anything of a controversial character".

Continuing with its main aim of encouraging and enabling communication between Law Society members, the Gazette also provided the opportunity for solicitors who were seeking positions to promote their services or vacancies to colleagues. These adverts provide interesting information about the social history of the time – for example, an advert from 1908 offered a room in a solicitors firm for the bargain rent of £38 per annum. The cost included "use of electric light". Use of the telephone was only "by arrangement".

As it continues to do today, the Law Society Gazette has always provided an opportunity for solicitors to stay abreast of new advances in technology – in 1968 it was advertising training courses in the use of computers and in 1984 it promoted a new method of 'electronic mail' known as 'fax'.

== See also ==
- List of largest UK law firms
