= John Crockford =

John Crockford was an English book publisher in the Mid-19th Century.

== Biography ==
He was born in Taunton about 1823.

By his early twenties he was a printer and publisher in London. He had a long association with Edward William Cox with whom he founded The Critic, The Field and The Clerical Directory.

He died on 13 January 1865 and was buried on the western side of Highgate Cemetery. His grave (no.13659) no longer has a headstone or any marker.

His obituary in The Era newspaper noted

“He possessed great activity, much intelligence, a kindly nature; and will be sorely missed”
