= Thomas Norton Longman =

English publisher (1771–1842)

Thomas Norton Longman (1771–1842) was an English publisher, who succeeded to the Longman's publishing business in 1793.

== Biography ==
Thomas Norton Longman was born in England, son of Thomas Longman (1730–1797), and his wife, Elizabeth Harris (1740–1808). He was also the great nephew of Thomas Longman (1699–1755), who founded the Longman publishing house in 1724. Longman was the eldest of twelve siblings and the third-generation Longman to run the family’s lucrative publishing business.

It was Longman who in 1799 purchased a major share in the copyright of Lindley Murray’s English Grammar, which had an annual sale of about 50,000 copies. This and other works by Murray added to a sizeable backlist of widely used Longman educational books – soon to appear regularly in separate catalogues – most of them regarded as textbooks.

Longman interest published extensively for the theatre in the early nineteenth century. It has sometimes been suggested that this line of business was the result of the marriage of his father in 1760 to the sister of Thomas Harris, who for many years was the proprietor and manager of Covent Garden, one of the three licensed theatres in London at that time. In fact, Longman had previously published several plays performed outside London. The Longman interest in the theatrical market is also reflected in translations of plays, among them August von Kotzebue’s The East Indian (1799). Some British dramatists had the majority of their books published by Longman; others were ‘printed under the authority of and by permission of the managers from the prompt books’. Longman playwrights included John O’Keeffe (1747–1833), William Pearce (1738–95), Thomas Morton (1764–1838) and Frederick Reynolds (1764–1841).

Longman also purchased the copyright from Joseph Cottle, of Bristol, of Southey's Joan of Arc and Wordsworth's Lyrical Ballads. He published the works of Wordsworth, Coleridge, Southey and Scott, and acted as London agent for the Edinburgh Review, which was started in 1802.

Longman's great-uncle and father called themselves "booksellers", not publishers, although they all produced books on their own account. In contrast, Longman and his partners (Rees, Orme, Hurst, Green) – still calling themselves (and being called) booksellers – have passed into history as ‘publishers’, a term whose meaning had changed during the course of the eighteenth century. Before Longman took the reign of the business, there was no concept of ‘publishers’. Booksellers brought book shares and the cumulative earnings were shared by all the share holders. At the turn of the nineteenth century, Longman began to consolidate the business and moved to buying the works outright, for a one time down payment.

Longman famously paid Thomas Moore, a famous Irish balladeer, an unprecedented sum of £3,000 in 1813 for his, yet to be written, poem Lalla Rookh (1817). This amount was later surpassed when Longmans paid Thomas Macaulay £20,000 on account of the profits for the third and fourth edition of History of England in 1856.

When the Copyright Act 1814 was under review, Longman gave informative evidence to the select committee on copyright in 1813, a year before the act was passed, which extended the term of fourteen years laid down in the Statute of Anne to twenty-eight years, or – if the author was alive at the end of that time – for the rest of his or her life.

Longman died at the age of 71, in August 1842, and left an inheritance of £200,000 for his widow and family.

== Family ==
Longman married Mary Slater, of Horsham, Sussex, in 1799. They had seven children.

The eldest daughter, Mary Longman, married Andrew Spottiswoode in 1819. The eldest son, Thomas Longman (1804–1879) married Georgina Townsend Bates. He succeeded his father, becoming the fourth-generation Longman to join the publishing business.
