= Religious of Christian Education =

Religious institute of Christian nuns who teach girls

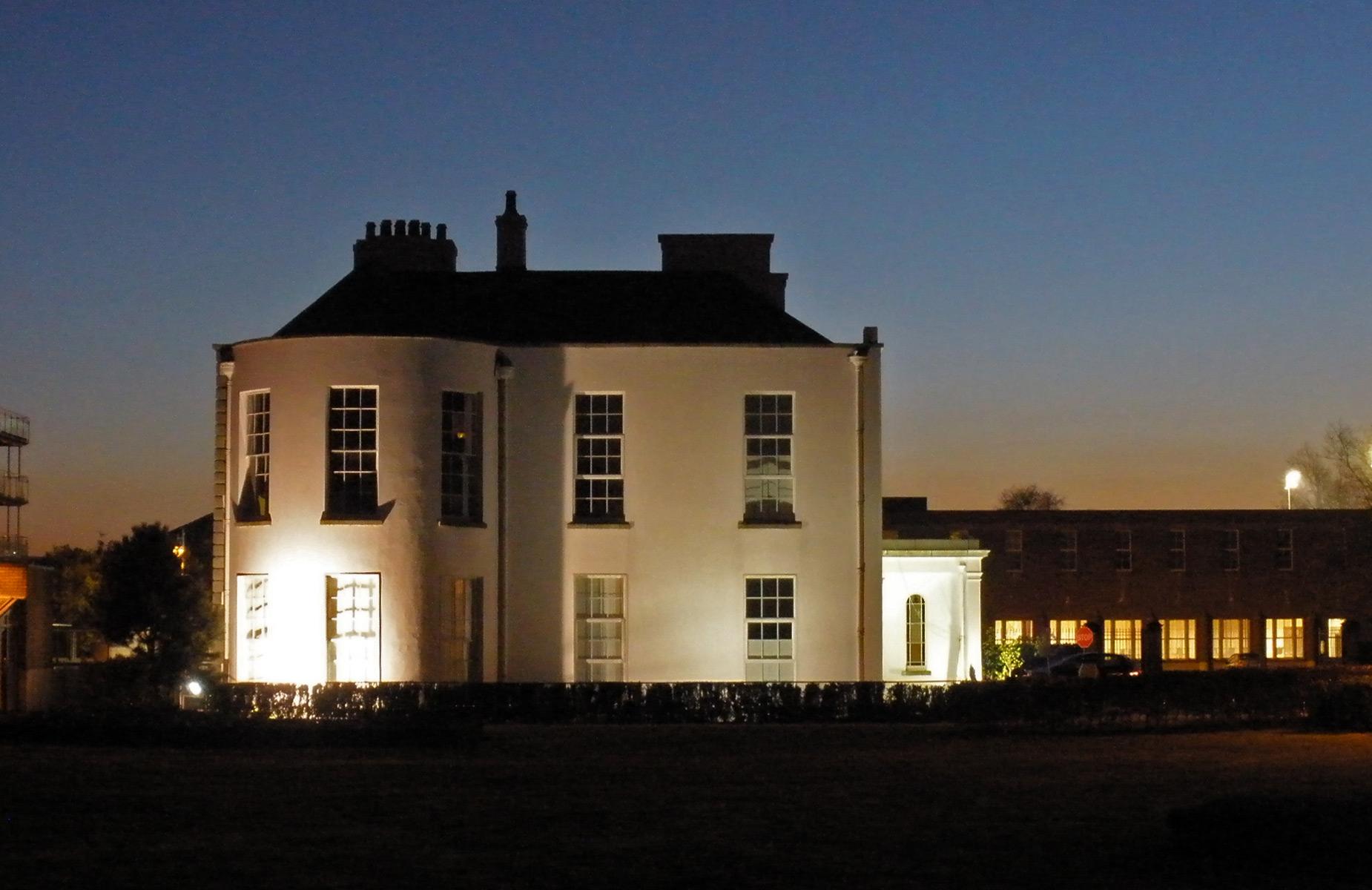
Our Lady's School, Dublin, Ireland, run by the Religious of Christian Education

The Religious of Christian Education is a Roman Catholic religious institute of religious sisters founded for the education of girls in post-Revolutionary France which now operates schools internationally.

== Foundation ==
The Sisters were established by the Abbé Louis Lafosse (1772–1839) and four young women, led by Mother Marie-Anne Dutertre, on 21 November 1817 in Échauffour, Normandy. Lafosse's vision, born from the destruction of the period of the French Revolution, was to provide the girls of the region a solid education, which was both humane and Christian.

The Bishop of Séez, Alexis Saussol, formally approved the congregation in 1821. The Sisters quickly established communities throughout Normandy and the neighbouring regions of France and Belgium.

== Expansion ==
The anti-clerical laws passed in France in 1880 and again in 1904 led the Sisters to establish new foundations outside of the French-speaking world. They established a community in Hampshire in the United Kingdom in 1889, and one in West Virginia in the United States, in 1905. They later opened a number of communities in Massachusetts, where they served the children of French-Canadian immigrants. They formerly ran two private secondary schools for girls in Massachusetts: Marycliff Academy in Arlington, then Winchester; and Jeanne D'Arc Academy in Milton, MA.

=== North Carolina ===
In December 1907, five women professed with the Religious of Christian Education moved into a house in Asheville, North Carolina at 48 Starnes Avenue. They established the Hillside Convent School in their home by 6 January 1908. By September 1908, they operated the school in two houses on North Main Street (now Broadway) and had an enrollment of 80 students, six of whom were boarding students. In 1910, the school was moved to the former Victoria Inn on Victoria Road in Asheville and renamed St. Genevieve-of-the-Pines. Classes at the new campus started in January 1911.

Initially, it was both a day school for boys and girls aged 6–13, and a boarding school for girls aged 14–18. St. Genevieve's College was added in 1912, offering a two-year course in French as well as a four-year liberal arts curriculum. In 1930, the school developed into a two-year college named St. Genevieve's Junior College, which operated until 1955, when it became the School for Secretaries. The boys from the day school moved into a separate building in 1949, which became the Gibbons Hall School for Boys. At its height, the campus covered over 35 acres.

The Religious of Christian Education ceased operating the schools in 1971 due to a shortage of vocations and the age and poor health of the Sisters. With the help of parents, the two schools merged to form St. Genevieve/Gibbons Hall School, an independent day school for both boys and girls, offering classes from kindergarten through the ninth grade, with some of the Sisters remaining as teachers.

To combat rising costs and declining enrollments at both schools, the school merged in 1987 with the Asheville Country Day School, at which time the Sisters withdrew from it. The St. Genevieve campus was sold to the Asheville-Buncombe Technical Community College, and a new school, the Carolina Day School, was established on the Asheville Country Day School campus.

=== Africa and Ireland ===
The Sisters established a school in Rabat, Morocco, in 1941. They opened a mission in the then-French colony of Dahomey (now the Republic of Benin) in 1958, which lasted until 2010. Two schools were opened in Ireland in the early 1950s. They also founded a school in Farnborough, Hampshire in 1889 called Hillside. In 1920 they moved to their present site at Farnborough Hill.

== Today ==
After nearly 200 years of operation, the original motherhouse of the congregation in Échauffour was closed in June 2011. This was due to the declining numbers of Sisters and the advanced age of most of them. The school they had operated from the time of their founding had already been closed in 1977.

== Bibliography ==
- Flament (Pierre), L'abbé Lafosse, fondateur de l'Éducation chrétienne, 1772-1839, Éducation chrétienne, Saint-Maur-des-Fossés, s.d. (1962).

== See also ==
- Sœurs de l'Éducation chrétienne (French Wikipedia).
- Religious of Christian Education at Vocations Ireland website.
- Religious of Christian Education listing at dublindiocese.ie.
