= The Critic (19th-century British magazine) =

British literary magazine (1843–1863)

The Critic was a magazine founded in London by John Crockford and Edward William Cox. Its full title was The Critic of Literature, Science, and the Drama, and it was edited by James Lowe during its existence from 1843 to 1863.

== History and profile ==
It was started as a book review section of Law Times, which reviewed the world of journals. The magazine was started as a separate publication in November 1843. In turn it gave rise to The Clerical Journal, in 1853. In 1851/2 it featured a substantial series of articles by Francis Espinasse, as "Herodotus Smith", on the quarterly journals. The magazine ended publication at the end of 1863.
