= Edward William Cox =

English lawyer and legal writer

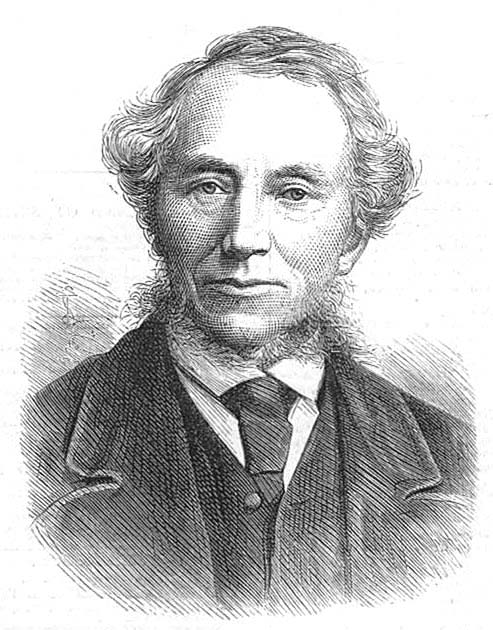
- Occupations: Lawyer, psychical researcher, writer

Edward William Cox known as Serjeant Cox (1809–1879) was an English lawyer and legal writer, who was also a successful publisher. He has been described as "the greatest entrepreneur of 'class' journalism".

== Early life ==
Cox was born in Taunton, the son of William Cox, a manufacturer and Harriet, daughter of William Upcott of Exeter. He became a solicitor in Taunton, and in 1836 established a local newspaper there, the Somerset County Gazette. He was called to the bar in 1843, joined the Western Circuit, and sold the title.

== Legal career ==
Cox moved to London to pursue his career as a barrister. His periodicals, reports and textbooks led to him being raised to the dignity of serjeant at law in 1868 – rather than his modest practice as a lawyer.

He held various significant legal appointments – Recorder of Helston and Falmouth 1857–1868 which he resigned when gaining the more important appointment as Recorder of Portsmouth. In 1870 he became Deputy Assistant Judge of the Middlesex Sessions, a position he continued to discharge until his death.

== Publisher ==
Around the time he was called to the bar, Cox founded the weekly Law Times which he conducted for nearly 25 years. He also founded or transformed the English journals The Field, bought cheaply from Benjamin Nottingham Webster,and the Exchange & Mart; also The Queen, founded by Samuel Beeton and bought by Cox in 1862, merged in 1863 with Ladies' Paper, and edited by Elizabeth Lowe under Horace Cox (his nephew), and the County Courts' Chronicle. An enduring publication was Crockford's Clerical Directory, started in 1858, although whether it was really his creation or that of his junior partner, John Crockford, remains an area of debate. Cox also set up his own newspapers. Some of them, like The Critic, had only limited success, but others such as Bazaar were profitable. Long before his death, he relinquished direct control over the publishing businesses but he continued to write.

== In politics ==
A lifelong Conservative, he unsuccessfully contested Tewkesbury in 1854 and Taunton in 1866. He did get elected in his native town in 1868 but was later unseated on petition next year by Henry James; James successfully brought a bribery petition. Cox was a Deputy Lieutenant and JP for Middlesex, and a JP for Westminster.

== Other interests ==
Cox spent freely on his joint interests on orchids and psychology. He had lectured on phrenology in 1834, and retained an interest in it. The London Dialectical Society, founded in 1867, set up in 1869 a committee to investigate spiritualism, of which Cox was a member. In 1871 he assisted William Crookes in his experiments into what Cox called "psychic force" Cox was interested in the psychological side of mediumship. Some have viewed him as a spiritualist rather than one interested in "secular" psychology; but he is said to have rejected the "spirit hypothesis". In 1875, he founded the Psychological Society for Great Britain, with George Harris; it was quickly dissolved after his death. In 1876 he passed to the medium Daniel Dunglas Home details of trickery used by others in séances.

Cox bought the fee simple (unfettered freehold) of the Serjeants' Inn in Chancery Lane at auction in 1877 for £57,100. The Inn's hall was reconstructed at his new house at Mill Hill (then Middlesex, now London, NW7) with the original stained glass windows from the hall and chapel at the inn.

His diversification proved profitable. When one of his heirs offered their reversionary interest in Cox's probate estate for sale the advertisement listed the sources of income. These included various leasehold properties in the City of London, Marlow Mills in Buckinghamshire, his newspaper and magazine titles as well as his landed property. Taken together, these had produced £54,000 a year for some years, although the bulk of the income came from Cox's magazines and newspapers.

== Landed estate ==
Cox is an example of the wealthy early Victorian middle class men who established large landed estates. He began in 1866 by the purchase of Moat Mount. He rebuilt the house as a Renaissance-style stuccoed villa to include a large main block with a carriage porch, and by 1873 owned 209 acres (0.85 km^{2}) in Middlesex. He and his son continued to add to the estate in Hendon and Edgware until it covered perhaps 2,000 acres (8.1 km^{2}) of valuable land near London. The estate included Moat Mount Park (120 acres), plus Coventry Farm (of 127 acres), Stoneyfields, Broadfields, Bays Hill, and Barnet Gate. Cox kept a pack of hounds, and he and his son hunted over what are now Golders Green, Hendon, Mill Hill and Hampstead Garden Suburb. While some land was sold in 1906, 1,090 acres (4.4 km^{2}) remained to form public open spaces and part of the Broadfields housing estate in Edgware when the Cox estate was finally broken up in June 1923.

Cox was also lord of the manors of Taunton Deane and Trull in Somerset. He also owned small estates at Ugborough and Widecombe in Devon. He died worth a reputed £400,000; although his estate was declared as under £200,000, he owned at least as much again in landed property.

== Family ==
Cox married twice. His first wife, Sophia, was the daughter of William Harris of the Royal Artillery, and they married in 1836. On 15 August 1844 he married Rosalinda Fonblanque, the only daughter of John Samuel Martin Fonblanque, a Commissioner in Bankruptcy, at Christ Church, Marylebone. They had seven children. By his first marriage he was the father of Irwin E. B. Cox and a daughter known as the novelist Mrs H. Bennett Edwards (1844–1936). Irwin Cox carried on his father's business interests, his acquisition of land and his preservation of game on the Mill Hill estate until his death in 1922 when the estate was broken up.

== Works ==
Cox's works included:

- 1829, a Poem, 1829.
- Reports of Cases in Criminal Law determined in all the Courts in England and Wales, 1846–78, 13 vols. (With Thomas William Saunders.)
- Railway Liabilities, 1847.
- Chancery Forms at Chambers, 1847.
- The Law and Practice of Registration and Elections, 1847.
- The New Statutes relating to the Administration of the Criminal Law, 1848.
- The Powers and Duties of Special Constables, 1848.
- The Magistrate, 1848.
- The Practice of Poor Removals, 1849.
- The Practical Statutes of the Session 1850, 1850. (With William Paterson).
- The Advocate, his Training, Practice, Rights, and Duties, 1852.
- Conservative Principles and Conservative Policy, a Letter to the Electors of Tewkesbury, 1852.
- Conservative Practice, a second letter, 1852.
- The Law and Practice of Joint-Stock Companies, 1855.
- The Law and Practice of Bills of Sale, 1855.
- The Practice of Summary Convictions in Larceny, 1856.
- A Letter to the Tewkesbury Electors, 1857.
- The Arts of Writing, Reading, and Speaking, in Letters to a Law Student, 1863.
- How to prevent Bribery at Elections, 1866.
- The Law relating to the Cattle Plague, 1866.
- Representative Reform, proposals for a Constitutional Reform Bill, 1866.
- Reports of all the Cases decided by the Superior Courts of Law and Equity, relating to the Law of Joint-Stock Companies, 1867–71, 4 vols.
- A Digest of all the Cases decided by the Courts relating to Magistrates' Parochial and Criminal Law, 1870.
- Spiritualism answered by Science, 1871.
- What am I? 1873.
- The Mechanism of Man, 1876.
- The Conservatism of the Future, 1877.
- The Principles of Punishment as applied to the Criminal Law by Judges and Magistrates, 1877.
- A Monograph of Sleep and Dreams, their Physiology and Psychology, 1878.

Cox prepared law books and reports with others, and contributed to the Transactions of the Psychological Society and the London Dialectical Society.

Parliament of the United Kingdom
Preceded by William Hay	Member of Parliament for Taunton; 1868–1869; With: Alexander Charles Barclay	Succeeded by Henry James
