= Thomas William Saunders =

Thomas William Saunders (1814–1890), was an English metropolitan police magistrate. And a notable revising barrister-at-law.

== Biography ==
Saunders, second son of Samuel E. Saunders of Bath, by Sarah, his wife, was born on 21 February 1814. He was entered a student at the Middle Temple on 16 April 1832, and called to the bar on 9 June 1837. He was appointed by Sir George Grey, 2nd Baronet to be recorder of Dartmouth From 1855 to October 1860 he was recorder of Dartmouth, and from that date to 1878 recorder of Bath. For some years he was a revising barrister, and in December 1872 became a commissioner for hearing municipal election petitions. Richard Assheton Cross appointed him a metropolitan police magistrate on 2 September 1878, and he sat at the Thames police-court until his resignation a few days before his death.

He died at Bournemouth on 28 February 1890, having married, on 16 August 1854, Frances Gregory, daughter of William Galpine of Newport, Isle of Wight, by whom he had children - William Edgar Saunders (b 1856) a barrister and author, Edward Francis Saunders (b 1858), Emma Maria Saunders (b 1860), Walter John Tite Saunders (b 1862) a Royal Navy Captain awarded the DSO, George Arthur Slack Saunders (b 1864), Frances Beatrice Saunders (b 1869)

== Publications ==
He was author of:

1. The Law of Assault and Battery, 1841.
2. A Collection of all the Statutes in force relating to Gaols and Houses of Correction in England and Wales, 1843.
3. The Practice of Summary Convictions before Justices of the Peace, 1846.
4. The Administration of Justice Acts and the Act to protect Justices from Vexatious Actions, 2nd ed. 1848.
5. Supplements to Burn's Justice of the Peace, 1848, 1849, 1851, 3 vols.
6. The Nuisance Removal and Disease Prevention Acts, 2nd ed. 1849; 3rd ed. 1854.
7. The Law and Practice of Orders of Affiliation and Proceedings in Bastardy, 2nd ed. 1850; 7th ed. 1878; and the 8th and 9th ed. with his son W. E. Saunders, 1884 and 1888.
8. The Militia Act, with Notes and Index, 1852; 3rd ed. 1855.
9. The Duties and Liabilities of Justices of the Peace, 1852.
10. The Law and Practice of Municipal Registration and Election, 1854; 2nd ed. 1873.
11. The Practice of Magistrates' Courts, 1st ed. 1855 (forming vol. i. of The Complete Practice of the Laws of England); 2nd ed. 1858; 4th ed. 1873.
12. The Counties Police Acts, 1856; 2nd ed. 1859.
13. The Rise and Progress of Criminal Jurisprudence in England, 1858.
14. The Refreshment Houses and Wine Licenses Act, 1860.
15. The Union Assessment Committee Act, 1862.
16. Quarter and Petty Sessions: a Letter to Sir George Grey, 1863.
17. Statistics of Crime and Criminals in England, 1864.
18. The Prison Act of 1865, 1865.
19. A Treatise upon the Law applicable to Negligence, London, 1871; Cincinnati, 1872.
20. Precedents of Indictments, 1872; 2nd ed., with W. E. Saunders, 1889.
21. A Treatise on the Law of Warranties, 1874.
22. The Summary Jurisdiction Act, 1879.
23. The Public Health Act, 1875.
24. Municipal Corporations Act, 1882.

With R. G. Welford, Saunders compiled Reports of Cases in the Law of Real Property, 1846. With Henry Thomas Cole, Saunders compiled Bail Court Reports, 1847–1849, 2 vols. With E. W. Cox, Saunders compiled Reports of County Court Cases’ 1852, and The Criminal Law Consolidation Acts, 1861 (2nd edit. 1862, 3rd edit. 1870). With his son W. E. Saunders, Saunders compiled The Law as applicable to the Criminal Offences of Children and Young Persons, 1887.

He edited Joseph Chitty's Summary of the Offices and Duties of Constables, 3rd edit. 1844; The Magistrate's Year Book, 1860; George Colwell Oke's Magisterial Formulist, 5th ed. 1876 (6th ed. 1881); and Oke's Magisterial Synopsis, 12th ed. 1876 (13th ed. 1881).
