= Queen (magazine) =

British society magazine

- Cover of the 27 March 1968 issue with Donyale Luna by Bill King
- Categories: Society
- Frequency: Fortnightly
- Founder: Samuel Beeton
- First issue: 7 September 1861
- Final issue: Late October 1970
- Country: United Kingdom
- Based in: London, United Kingdom
- ISSN: 0033-6009

Queen was a British society magazine established by Samuel Beeton in 1861 as The Queen. In 1958 the magazine was sold to Jocelyn Stevens and became one of the top publications of the "swinging sixties".

In 1970 the publication merged with British Harper's Bazaar to become Harper's & Queen. In 2006 the magazine dropped "& Queen" to become Harper's Bazaar UK.

== Background ==
Queen was a British society magazine, the magazine was founded in 1861 by Samuel Beeton as The Queen, and as The Lady's Newspaper, The Queen & Court Chronicle from 1863 to 1863, The Queen, The Lady's Newspaper & Court Chronicle from 1864 to 1922, then as The Queen from 1923 to 1961 and finally as Queen from 1962 to 1970.

The magazine was published weekly and later fortnightly.

=== Editors ===
Editor	Start year	End year	Ref.
Beatrix Miller	1958	1964	
Dennis Hackett	1964	1965	
Hugh Johnson	1968	1970	
Fred Grunfeld	1970	1970	
Sally Beauman	1970	1970	

== History ==
In the 1860s the magazine focused on the lives of the wealthy Victorian society, and had approval to use the name by Queen Victoria. Queen Victoria also corrected proofs of the magazine in its early years. During this time the magazine contained poetry and articles on society news, fashion and domestic subjects.

The Lady's Newspaper and Pictorial Times (1848–1863) and the Court Chronicle (?–1863) merged with the magazine in 1863.

In 1957, Jocelyn Stevens purchased the magazine and reinvigorated it, targeting a younger audience and embracing the Swinging Sixites. Following his purchase of the magazine he approached Beatrix Miller (former editorial secretary and features writer) to leave Vogue in New York City and return to London to edit The Queen. Mark Boxer was hired as art director.

The January 1959 issue featured almost only pictures of China taken by Henri Cartier-Bresson.

22 June 1966 cover

In 1962 the magazine was retitled to Queen.

The ideal reader of the new Queen, as envisioned by editor Beatrix Miller, was 'Caroline' — a persona detailed in a style guide given to every contributing writer so they knew exactly for whom they were writing. According to Clement Freud the fictional Caroline had fair long hair, left school at sixteen and was the "sort of person one ended up in bed with".

In 1964 in an attempt to reverse the Pilkington Report, Stevens financed a pirate radio called Radio Caroline (named after Caroline, Queen's ideal reader). Initially the radio operated out of the Queen editorial offices on Fetter Lane.

Miller left the magazine in 1964 to edit British Vogue, where she remained till 1984.

After Radio Caroline was banned in 1967 Stevens began to lose interest in the magazine, with the publication "going nowhere" and readers beginning to lose interest. In 1968 he sold the magazine to Michael Lewis of Oxley Industries. Hugh Johnson was appointed as editor after an interview regarding a travel supplement.

Johnson hired Ann Barr of The Weekend Telegraph as features editor. Under Johnson it took on disdain for all that could be viewed as out of style, with the fashion editor refusing to see the Paris collections calling them "too boring". The magazine included some of the last magazine shoots of Sharon Tate before her 1969 murder. Clothing would be from "Courrèges and Ungaro. Or bits of plastic on chains like Paco Rabanne.'"

Johnson left to edit The World Atlas of Wine and with falling circulation Michael Lewis put the magazine up for sale.

In August 1970 it was announced that the magazine would merge with British Harper's Bazaar, with the first issue appearing in November 1970. The aim of the merger was to use the best material from both magazines and increase circulation to over 500,000. At the time the two publications were rivals and aimed at a similar audience. The National Magazine Company (publisher of Harper's Bazaar) as it still had the aura of "it" compared to Harper's Bazaar which had fallen out of popularity.
