= Longman =

British publishing company

Pearson Longman
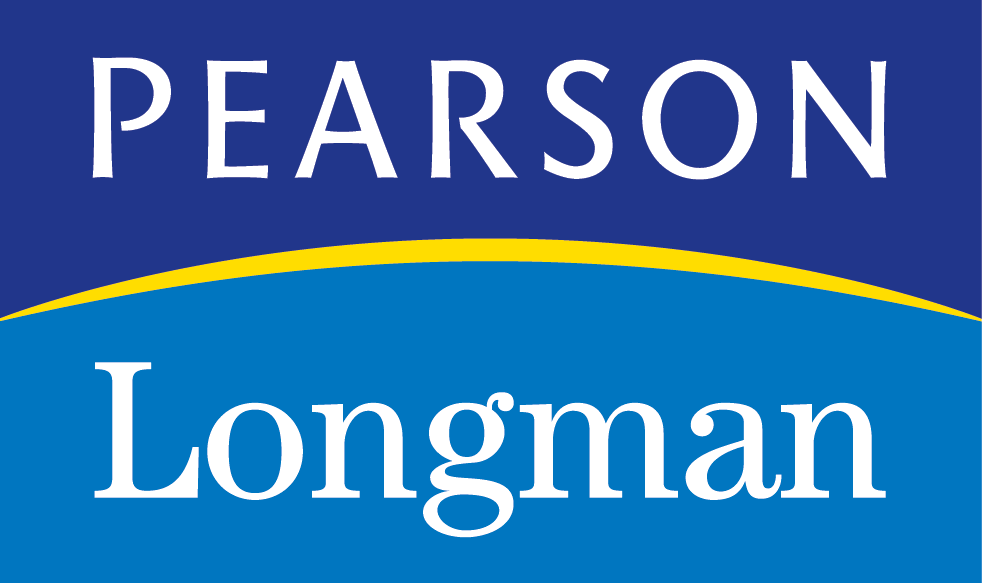
- Parent company: Pearson Education
- Founded: 1724; 302 years ago
- Founder: Thomas Longman
- Defunct: 1968
- Successor: Pearson plc
- Country of origin: England
- Headquarters location: Harlow
- Publication types: Reference works, textbooks
- Imprints: Pearson Longman
- Official website: pearsonelt.com

Longman, also known as Pearson Longman, is a publishing company founded in 1724 in London, England, that is owned by Pearson PLC.

Since 1968, Longman has been used primarily as an imprint by Pearson's Schools business. The Longman brand is also used for the Longman Schools in China and the Longman Dictionary.

== History ==
=== Beginnings ===
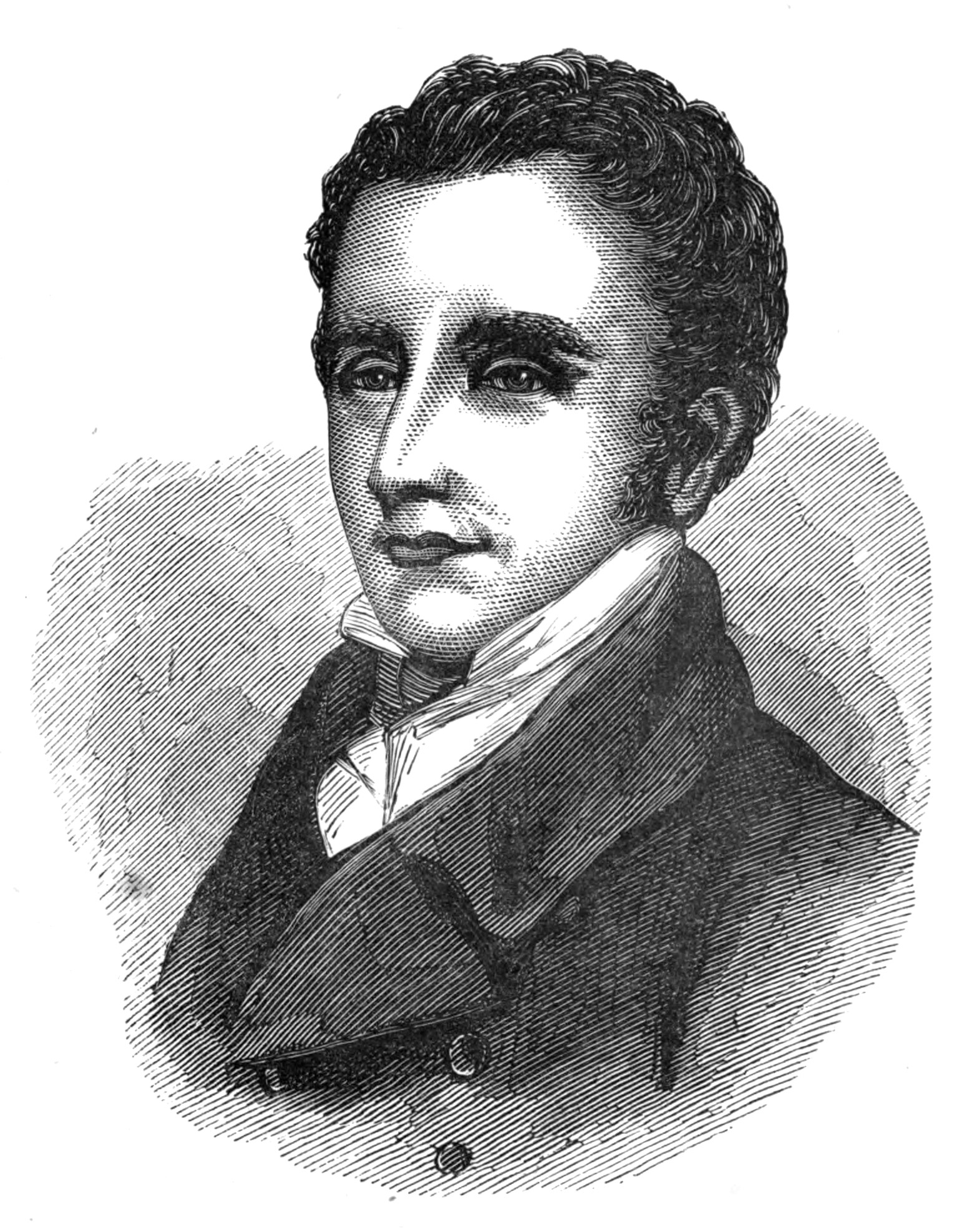
Thomas Longman

The Longman company was founded by Thomas Longman (1699 – 18 June 1755), the son of Ezekiel Longman (died 1708), a gentleman of Bristol. Thomas was apprenticed in 1716 to John Osborn, a London bookseller, and at the expiration of his apprenticeship married Osborn's daughter. In August 1724, he purchased the stock and household goods of William Taylor, the first publisher of Robinson Crusoe, for £2282 9s 6d. Taylor's two shops in Paternoster Row, London, were known respectively as the Black Swan and the Ship, premises at that time having signs rather than numbers, and became the publishing house premises.

Longman entered into partnership with his father-in-law, Osborn, who held one-sixth of the shares in Ephraim Chambers's Cyclopaedia (1728). Longman himself was one of the six booksellers, who undertook the responsibility of Samuel Johnson's Dictionary (1746–1755).

=== Second and third generations ===
In 1754, Longman took into partnership his nephew, Thomas Longman (1730–1797), and the title of the firm became T. and T. Longman. Upon the death of his uncle in 1755, Longman became sole proprietor. He greatly extended the colonial trade of the firm. In 1794, he took Owen Rees as a partner; in the same year, Thomas Brown (c. 1777–1869) entered the house as an apprentice.

Longman had three sons. Of these, Thomas Norton Longman (1771–1842) succeeded to the business. In 1804, two more partners, including Edward Orme & Thomas Hurst, were admitted, and the former apprentice Brown became a partner in 1811; in 1824, the title of the firm was changed to 'Longman, Hurst, Rees, Orme, Brown & Green'. A document of 1823 "Grant of Land in the Concan" printed by the firm under this name shows the name change was from 1823 or earlier.

In 1799, Longman purchased the copyright of Lindley Murray's English Grammar, which had an annual sale of about 50000 copies. In the following year, Richmal Mangnall's Historical and Miscellaneous Questions for the Use of Young People was purchased, and went through 84 editions by 1857. In about 1800, he also purchased the copyright of Southey's Joan of Arc and Wordsworth's Lyrical Ballads, from Joseph Cottle of Bristol. He published the works of Wordsworth, Coleridge, Southey and Scott, and acted as London agent for the Edinburgh Review, which was started in 1802. In 1802 appeared the first part of Rees's Cyclopædia, edited by Abraham Rees. This was completed in 39 volumes, plus six volumes of plates, in 1819.

In 1814, arrangements were made with Thomas Moore for the publication of Lalla Rookh, for which he was paid £3000; and when Archibald Constable failed in 1826, Longmans became the proprietors of the Edinburgh Review. They issued in 1829 Lardner's Cabinet Encyclopaedia, and in 1832 McCulloch's Commercial Dictionary.

=== Fourth and fifth generations ===
Thomas Norton Longman died on 29 August 1842, leaving his two sons, Thomas (1804–1879) and William (1813–1877), in control of the business in Paternoster Row. Their first success was the publication of Macaulay's Lays of Ancient Rome, which was followed in 1841 by the issue of the first two volumes of his History of England, which after a few years had a sale of 40000 copies.

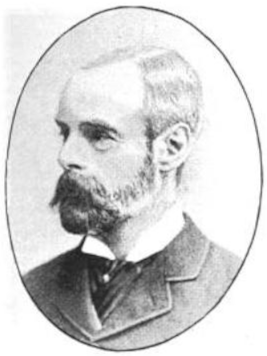
Thomas Norton Longman (1849–1930)

The two brothers were well known for their literary talent. Thomas Longman edited a beautifully illustrated edition of the New Testament, and William Longman was the author of several important books, among them a History of the Three Cathedrals dedicated to St Paul (1869) and a work on the History of the Life and Times of Edward III (1873). In 1863, the firm took over the business of John William Parker, and with it Fraser's Magazine, and the publication of the works of John Stuart Mill and James Anthony Froude; while in 1890 they incorporated with their own all the publications of the old firm of Rivington, established in 1711. The family control of the firm (later "Longmans, Green & Co.") was continued by Thomas Norton Longman, son of Thomas Longman. In 1884, the firm employed John William Allen as an educationalist. Allen grew the firm's educational list, including textbooks he wrote himself. He later inherited the shares of W. E. Green and became a shareholder in 1918.

== 1900 onwards ==
In December 1940, Longman's Paternoster Row offices were destroyed in The Blitz, along with most of the company's stock. The company survived this crisis, however, and became a public company in 1948. Longman was acquired by the global publisher Pearson, owner of Penguin and The Financial Times, in 1968. Longman's medical lists was merged with other Pearson subsidiaries to form Churchill Livingstone in 1972. Also in 1972, Mark Longman, last of the Longman family to run the company, died.

Longman continued to exist as an imprint of Pearson, under the name 'Pearson Longman'. Pearson Longman specialized in English, including English as a second or foreign language, history, economics, philosophy, political science, and religion.

Longman is now primarily used by Pearson's ELT business (English Language Teaching). The Longman brand is now only used for the Longman Schools in China and oddments such as the Longman Dictionary and Kennedy's Revised Latin Primer. All other textbooks and products use the Pearson brand/imprint.

== Longman imprints ==
Longman imprints:

- 1724 T. Longman
- 1725 J. Osborn and T. Longman
- 1734 T. Longman
- 1745 T. Longman and T. Shewell
- 1747 T. Longman
- 1753 T. and T. Longman
- 1755 M. and T. Longman
- 1755 T. Longman
- 1793 T. N. Longman. Also T. Longman
- 1797 Messrs. Longman and Rees
- 1799 T. N. Longman and O. Rees
- 1800 Longman and Rees
- 1804 Longman, Hurst, Rees and Orme
- 1811 Longman, Hurst, Rees, Orme and Brown
- 1823 Longman, Hurst, Rees, Orme, Brown and Green
- 1825 Longman, Rees, Orme, Brown and Green
- 1832 Longman, Rees, Orme, Brown, Green and Longmans
- 1838 Longman, Orme, Brown, Green and Longmans
- 1840 Longman, Orme & Co.
- 1841 Longman, Brown & Co.
- 1842 Longman, Brown, Green and Longmans
- 1856 Longman, Brown, Green, Longmans and Roberts
- 1859 Longman, Green, Longman and Roberts
- 1862 Longman, Green, Longman, Roberts and Green
- 1865 Longmans, Green, Reader and Dyer
- 1880 Longmans, Green & Co.
- 1926 Longmans, Green & Co. (Ltd.)
- 1959 Longmans
- 1969 Longman

== See also ==
- Express Publishing
- Macmillan Publishers
- Oxford University Press

== General and cited references ==
- Briggs, A. (2008). "Appendix 2". A history of Longmans and their books. London: British Library.
- Chisholm, Hugh, ed. (1911). "Rivington, Charles" . Encyclopædia Britannica. Vol. 23 (11th ed.). Cambridge University Press. p. 387.
- Gordon, Alexander (1896). "Rees, Thomas (1777–1864) § Owen" . In Lee, Sidney (ed.). Dictionary of National Biography. Vol. 47. London: Smith, Elder & Co. p. 402.
- Treasure, Geoffrey (1997). Who's Who in Late Hanoverian Britain (2nd ed.). London: Shepheard-Walwyn. ISBN 978-0-85683-137-9. Archived from the original on 13 October 2018.

Attribution:
