= Criminal Law & Justice Weekly =

Legal magazine (1837–2018)

- Magazine cover
- Categories: Law
- Frequency: weekly
- Publisher: LexisNexis Butterworths
- First issue: 1837
- Final issue: 2018
- Country: United Kingdom
- ISSN: 1741-4555

The Criminal Law & Justice Weekly (CL&J), formerly known as Justice of the Peace (JPN) was at the time of its closing in 2018 the oldest legal weekly magazine in England and Wales. It had continuously reported all aspects of the law for the magisterial and criminal courts, from its first issue in 1837 until the final issue on 20 April 2018.

First published by Shaw and Co, with the aim of providing the legal community with a "universal medium of communication" the magazine set out to provide certainty of the speediest information upon all subjects falling under the respective cognizance of its readership. The magazine moved to Butterworths in the early 20th century and during the Second World War, it was produced at West Dean House (Butterworths & Co were evacuated to West Sussex during the war).

In 1972, the Justice of the Peace was sold to Barry Rose, who also edited the magazine until he sold the Justice of the Peace back to Butterworths in 1997. At that time, and until its end, the editor was Diana Rose, Barry Rose's daughter. The back volumes of the Justice of the Peace formed a history of the criminal law and wider society of England and Wales. Butterworths was absorbed into LexisNexis, which was part of Reed Elsevier.

CL&J's remit was to report on all matters concerning the criminal courts and the latest news for its readers. It was aimed at legal practitioners: judges, justice’s clerks and executives, barristers, solicitors, police, probation, local authorities and all who worked within the magistrate’s and criminal court systems. It also included cases from Justice of the Peace Reports.

== Features and contents ==
- Independent comment on important decisions made by the courts or government.
- Notes of the Week – reporting important and relevant cases of interest.
- Features, articles and interviews.
- Current news and projects being used within the criminal justice system, covering family law, coroners, trading standards, local authority, probation, prison and police areas, road traffic and custom and excise, IT developments and relevant cases.
- Notes of Cases – taken from Justice of the Peace Reports.
- Reports on sentencing and current practise.
- Weekly Law Digest – round up of the new Acts, statutory instruments and parliamentary publications.

== History ==
The Justice of the Peace (JP) magazine continuously reported for 172 years all aspects of the law for the magisterial and criminal courts, since first published in 1837. When it ended, it was the oldest legal weekly journal in England and Wales, and read by those making decisions in their specialist areas within the Criminal Justice System.

First published by Shaw and Co, with the aim of providing the legal community with a "universal medium of communication" the magazine set out to provide certainty of the speediest information upon all subjects falling under the respective cognizance of its readership ((1837) 1 JPN 1).The magazine moved to Butterworths in the early 20th century and during the Second World War, it was produced at West Dean House (Butterworths & Co were evacuated to West Sussex during the war). In 1972, the Justice of the Peace was sold to Barry Rose, who also edited the magazine until he sold the Justice of the Peace back to Butterworths in 1997. The back volumes of the Justice of the Peace contain a history of the life and times of England and Wales.

== Editor ==
Past editors: William Eagle, John Mee Mathew, J. L. Jellicoe, T. W. Saunders, Charles Clark, D. D. Keane, James A Foot J. B. Dasent, and W C Glen. Adrian Turner, Barrister, also co-editor of Stone's Justices' Manual, Diana Rose.

== Justice of the Peace Reports ==
The Justice of the Peace Reports were a series of law reports. For the purpose of citation, the title of the Justice of the Peace Reports may be abbreviated to JP. Up to and including volume 95, the reports were generally bound at the end of the newspaper. From and including volume 96, the reports were published separately from the newspaper in a smaller volume. The newspaper had separate pagination after volume 67.

== Sources ==
- O. Hood Phillips. A First Book of English Law. Fourth Edition. Sweet and Maxwell. 1960. Page 169.
- Glanville Williams. Learning the Law. Eleventh Edition. Stevens and Sons. London. 1982. Page 47.
- "Local Government Review". Newspaper Press Directory 1974. Benn Brothers Limited. 1974. Volume 123. Page 498. Google Books
- Ernest Benn Ltd. "Local Government Review" in Benn's Media. Benn Business Information Services. London. 1993. Volume 1. Page 611. See also "Barry Rose Law Periodicals" at page 70. Google Books
- David Woodworth. Guide to Current British Journals. Library Association. 1973. Volume 1. Paragraphs 956, 957 and 960 at page 69. Google Books
- Eric Crowther. Advocacy for the Advocate. B Rose. 1984. Page 120. Google Books
- "JP's Sesquicentenary Dinner" (1986), 130 Solicitors Journal 507 Google Books
- Lea v Justice of the Peace Limited and R. J. Acford Limited, The Times, 14 March 1947
- H Montgomery Hyde (ed.). Privacy and the Press: The "Daily Mirror" Press Photographer Libel Action, Lea v. Justice of the Peace, Ltd., and R. J. Acford, Ltd. Butterworth & Co. (Publishers) Ltd. London. 1947.
- "A Study in Three Dimensions" (1947), 17 The Fortnightly Law Journal 87 Google Books
- "Books and Publications" (1938), 86 Law Journal 53 Google Books
