= Thomas Longman (1699–1755) =

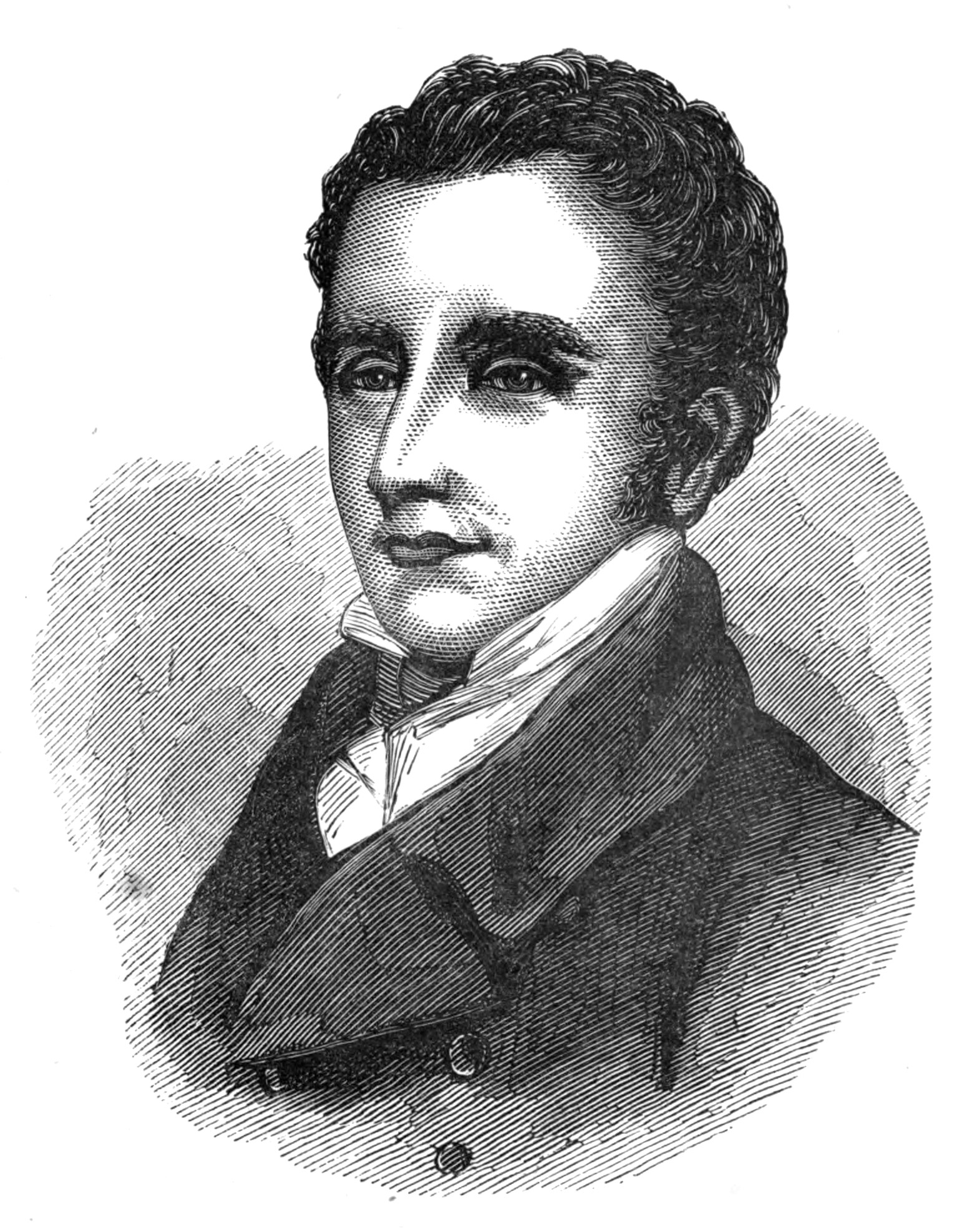
- Born: 1699; Bristol, England
- Died: 18 June 1755 (aged 55-56)
- Occupation: Publisher
- Known for: Founder of Longman Publishing House
- Spouse(s): Mary Osborn (1731-1755, his death)
- Parent(s): Ezekiel & Sarah Longman

Thomas Longman (1699 – 18 June 1755) was an English publisher who founded the publishing house of Longman.

== Biography ==
Longman was born at Bristol, the son of Ezekiel Longman and his second wife Sarah. The Longman family had been involved in the manufacture of soap for several generations and his father owned a shop and stalls in Temple Street. Longman's parents had died by the time he was nine. His father requested in his will that he be "especially well and handsomely bred and educated". From his mother he inherited a considerable amount of property at Winford, Winfrith, Rudghill, and Stroud. When Longman was seventeen his guardians - his brother Ezekiel, Nathaniel Webb, and Mrs. Thomas Coules - apprenticed him for seven years to John Osbom, a bookseller in Lombard Street, London. In 1724, when his apprenticeship was ended, he purchased the business of John Taylor or William Taylor, a bookseller in Paternoster Row for £2282. Taylor had been the first publisher of Robinson Crusoe, and traded at the sign of the Ship and Black Swan.

In time, John Osborn entered into partnership with Longman, and they traded as 'J. Osborn & T. Longman' at the sign of the Ship. They were among the original shareholders of the Cyclopaedia, or an Universal Dictionary of Arts and Sciences of Ephraim Chambers, which became very successful and profitable. When Osborn, whose daughter became the wife of Longman, died in about 1734, Longman became sole owner of the business. He steadily increased the business by buying shares in sound literary properties. In 1740, he published the third volume of David Hume's first work, A Treatise of Human Nature, after he had been introduced to Hume by Francis Hutcheson. In 1744, he held the largest number of shares of Chambers's 'Cyclopaedia', owning nearly a sixth. He was one of the six booksellers, who entered into an agreement with Samuel Johnson to produce an English dictionary, the 'Plan' of which was issued in 1747. In 1753, he took into partnership his nephew Thomas, who carried on the business.

Longman married Mary Osborn, daughter of John Osborn in 1731. They had no children. Longman died on 18 June 1755.
