= Euphrasia (disambiguation) =

Euphrasia may refer to:

- Euphrasia, a genus of flowering plants
- Saint Euphrasia of Constantinople
- Saint Euphrasia Eluvathingal
- "Euphrasia: A Tale of Greece", 1838 short story by Mary Shelley
- Euphrasia (Ninjago), a character in Ninjago
