= Midas (Shelley play) =

1820 verse drama by Mary and Percy Bysshe Shelly

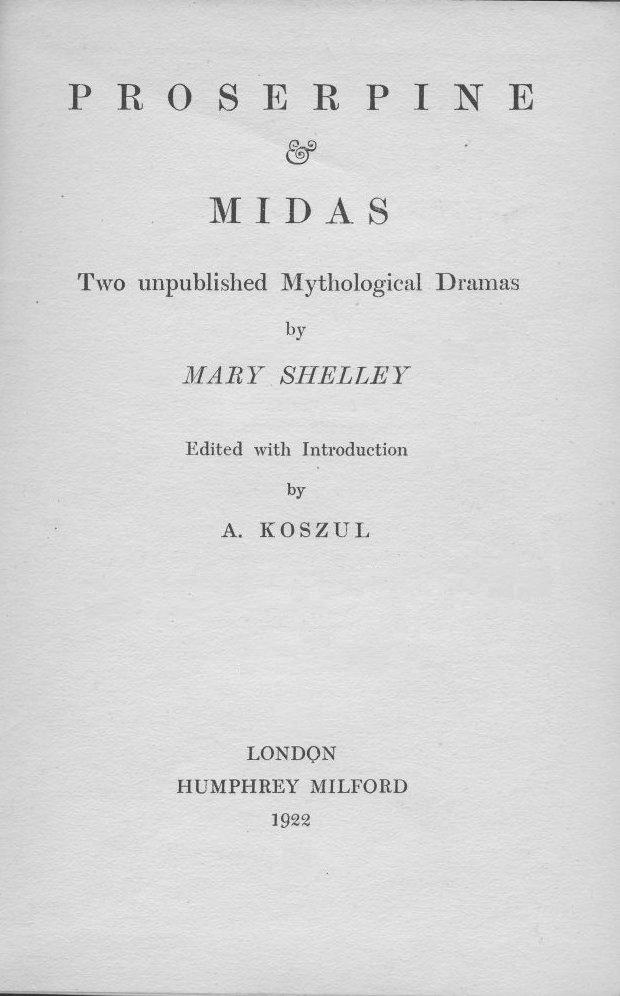
Midas was first published in 1922

Midas is a verse drama in blank verse by the Romantic writers Mary Shelley and Percy Bysshe Shelley. Mary wrote the drama and Percy contributed two lyric poems to it. Written in 1820 while the Shelleys were living in Italy, Mary Shelley tried unsuccessfully to have the play published by children's magazines in England in the 1830s; however, it was not published until A. Koszul's 1922 scholarly edition. Whether or not the drama was ever meant to be staged is a point of debate among scholars. The play combines the stories of the musical contest between Apollo and Pan and that of King Midas and his ability to turn everything he touches to gold.

Largely concerned with gender issues, Midas comments on the definitions of femininity and masculinity in the early nineteenth century and the developing ideology of separate spheres which encouraged women to restrict themselves to domestic affairs and men to political affairs. Part of the Romantic interest in rewriting classical myths, Midas focuses on challenging patriarchy and satirising the unbounded accumulation of wealth.

The genre of Midas bears the marks of gender debates, as well, with Percy writing in the traditionally male-dominated form of the lyric and Mary focusing on the details of everyday life in her verse drama. Since the play's first publication in 1922, critics have paid more attention to Percy Shelley's lyrics than Mary Shelley's drama. However, since the 1990s, this trend has reversed itself as scholars explore works of Mary Shelley other than Frankenstein (1818).

== Background ==
Mary Shelley by Richard Rothwell (1839–40)

By 1816, the Shelleys were living in Italy and in 1818 and 1819, two of their young children died, Clara and William. Mary entered into a deep depression and became alienated from Percy, who was not as deeply affected by the loss of their children. Mary Shelley revived a bit with the birth of Percy Florence later in 1819.

Despite the overwhelming grief caused by the death of her two children, Mary Shelley continued to study and read as she had throughout her life. Between 1818 and 1820, she exposed herself to quite a bit of drama. She read many of William Shakespeare's plays, some with Percy Shelley. Percy believed that Mary had a talent for drama and convinced her to study the great English, French, Latin, and Italian plays as well as drama theory. He even sought her advice regarding his play The Cenci. Less glamorously, Mary transcribed the manuscript of Percy's drama Prometheus Unbound. The Shelleys also attended operas, ballets, and plays.

Mary Shelley's studies were broad during these years. She began to study Greek in 1820 and read widely on education. For example, she read Jean-Jacques Rousseau's philosophical work on education, Emile, and his sentimental novel, La Nouvelle HéloÏse as well as Thomas Day's children's book The History of Sandford and Merton.

== Writing and publication ==
Mary Shelley wrote Midas in 1820. Miranda Seymour, a Mary Shelley biographer, speculates that she wrote Midas and Proserpine for two young girls she met and befriended, Laurette and Nerina Tighe. They were the daughters of friends of the Shelleys in Italy and their mother was a former pupil of Mary Shelley's mother, Mary Wollstonecraft. The same year, she wrote the children's story Maurice for Laurette.

Mary Shelley submitted the play for publication to The Browning Box, edited by Bryan Walter Procter, in 1824; it was rejected. In 1830, she submitted it to Rudolph Ackermann for publication in his children's magazine Forget-Me-Not; it was again rejected. In 1832, she sent it to Alaric Alexander Watts for consideration in his annual Literary Souvenir, however in her letter she suggested that the drama may be more appropriate for the juvenile publications edited by his wife, Priscilla Maden Watts. The drama was first published in 1922 by literary scholar A. Koszul.

== Plot summary ==
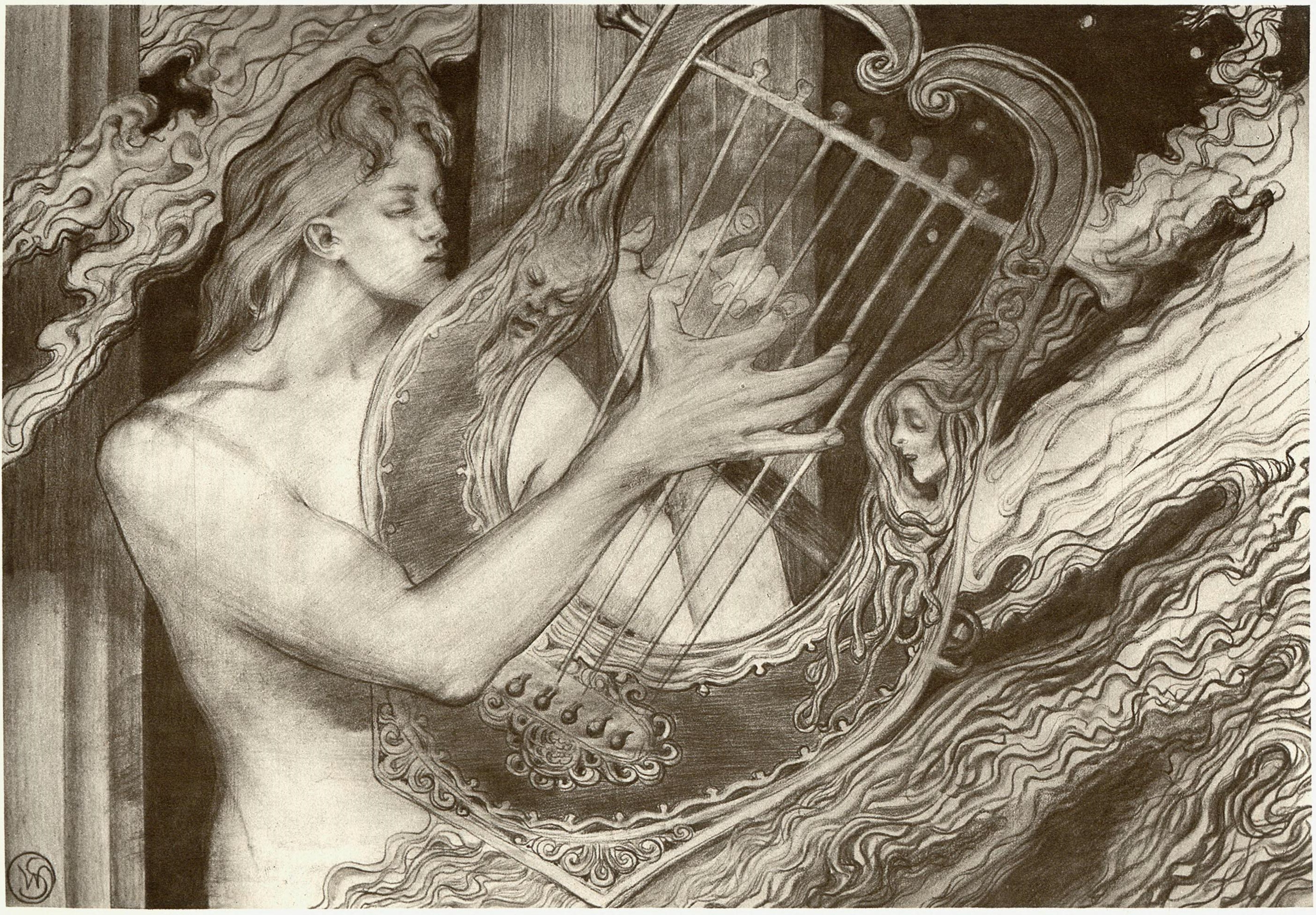
Apollo with his lyre by Stanisław Wyspiański (c. 1897)

In Act I Pan challenges Apollo to a musical contest, with Tmolus as the judge. Tmolus awards the victory to Apollo. Pan challenges his decision, asking the mortal King Midas to decide the contest. Midas has a bias towards Pan and decides in favour of him. Apollo, upset at this mortal's interference in immortal affairs, punishes Midas by turning his ears into ass's ears, saying "thus to the world / Wear thou the marks of what thou art, / Let Pan himself blush at such a judge". Zopyrion, Midas's prime minister, helps the king figure out to hide his ears: they design a crown to hide them. Although Zopyrion is determined to keep the king's secret, he still finds the situation hysterical. When he encounters Asphalion, a courtier, he misunderstands him and thinks that Asphalion also knows the secret. Asphalion discovers he has a secret, but not what it is. After Asphalion leaves, Zopyrion whispers the secret to the "greenest reeds that sway / And nod your feathered heads beneath the sun". Bacchus then arrives, searching for Silenus. Bacchus decides to reward Midas for his hospitality and offers to grant him any wish he wants. Although his prime minister suggests that he wish for his original ears back, Midas wishes that everything he touches be turned to gold. During this conversation, Midas is convinced he hears Zopyrion whispering his secret, but it is really the reeds saying "Midas, the king, has the ears of an ass."

Act II begins with Midas enamored with his new power of turning things to gold. However, his courtiers complain of being forced to wear heavy golden clothing. Midas rebukes them, saying "I am a God!". But Midas himself begins to experience the problems of turning everything he touches to gold: he cannot eat, for example. He starts to regret his wish, saying "Oh! fool! to wish to change all things to gold! / Blind Ideot that I was!". Midas prays to Bacchus to take away his power, begging "Make me a hind, clothe me in ragged skins— / And let my food be bread, unsavoury roots, / But take from me the frightful curse of gold". Midas has his courtiers sacrifice to the gods to see if he can be relieved of his curse; Bacchus relents and tells him to bathe in the river. The courtiers find it strange that he does not remove his crown while he swims; one of them resolves to peek under his crown while he is sleeping. Returning from his swim, Midas celebrates nature, saying gold "is a sordid, base and dirty thing;— / Look at the grass, the sky, the trees, the flowers, / These are Joves treasures & they are not gold".

== Genre ==
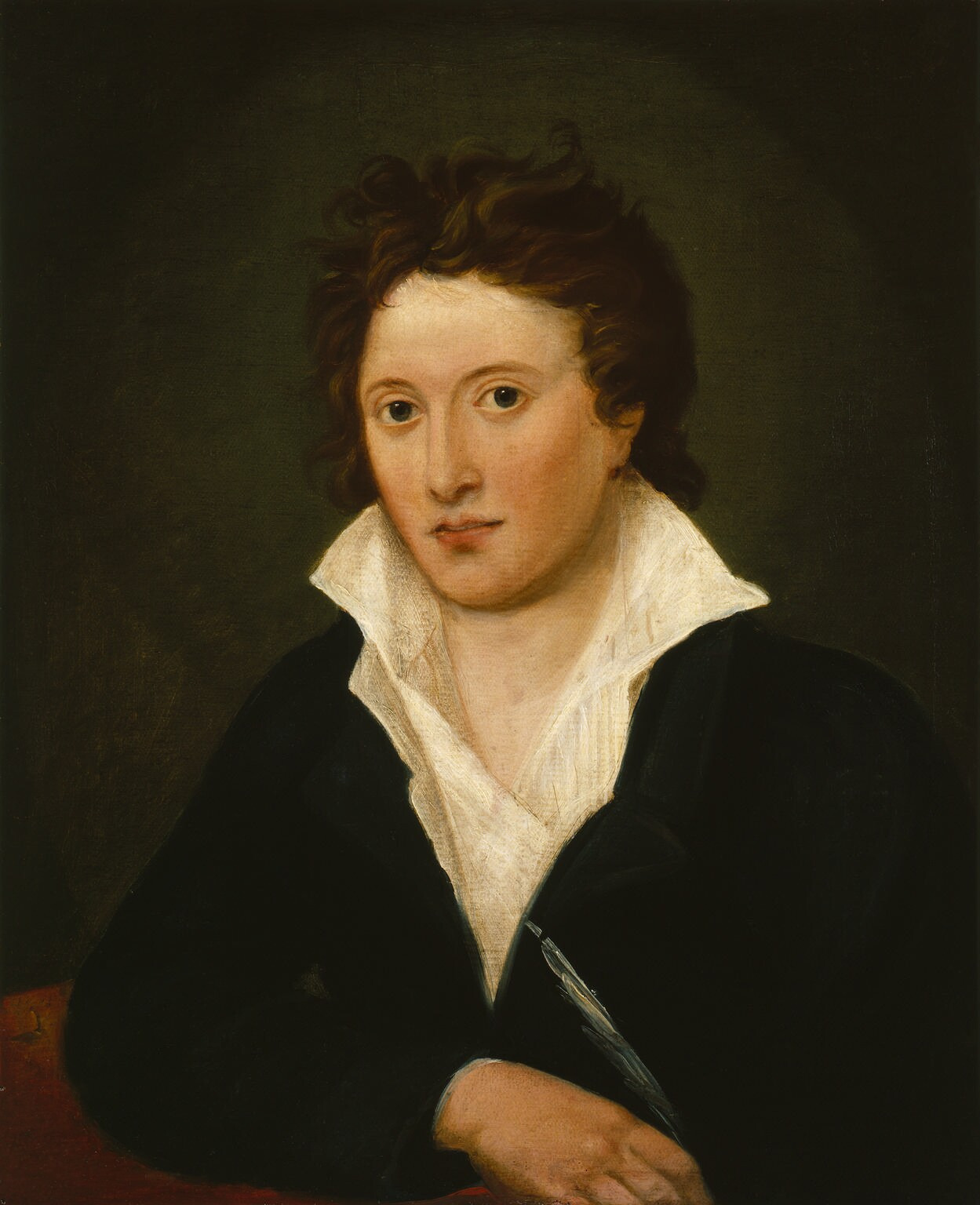
Percy Bysshe Shelley (1819, Amelia Curran)

Mary Shelley described Midas as a "short mythological comic drama in verse". Her efforts to publish it as a children's drama suggest that she thought of it as children's literature. At this time, "instructional" literature for children was most often written by women, who were viewed as having superior knowledge regarding the raising of the young. While placing women in a traditional maternal role, this literature also allowed them the opportunity to participate in the public sphere as authors and directors of morality. Shelley's mother, Mary Wollstonecraft, had written two such works, Thoughts on the Education of Daughters (1787) and Original Stories from Real Life (1788) that she undoubtedly knew. As Purinton writes, "Mary Shelley's seemingly simple plays are complicated by their position with this context of 'instructional' literature at a historical moment when the boundaries of private and public discourse are blurred."

Scholars have disputed whether or not Shelley meant for her play to be staged. Alan Richardson, for example, argues that the play is "lyrical drama" or "mental theater" in the style of Romantic closet drama "with its emphasis on character over plot, on reaction over action, and its turn away from the theater". However, Judith Pascoe challenges this conclusion, pointing to manuscript evidence such as stage directions; she argues that Mary Shelley intended her play to be staged. Literary scholar Jeffrey Cox has argued that Midas, along with Proserpine, Prometheus Unbound and other plays written by the Leigh Hunt circle, were "not a rejection of the stage but an attempt to remake it". Turning from tragedy and the comedy of manners, these writers reinvented drama by writing masques and pastoral dramas. He argues that Midas and Proserpine are "a mythological diptych that indites on stage the forces of oppression". For him, Midas "ends appropriately with Midas giving up his golden touch and turning to celebrate a pastoral world of simplicity and equality".

In the early nineteenth century, lyric poetry was associated with male poets and quotidian poetry (i.e., the poetry of the everyday) with female poets. The division of labour in Midas reflects this trend: Percy contributed the two lyric poems in the drama while Mary's play contains the kind of detail found in the poetry of other women. However, Mary Shelley does not simply accept these gender-genre distinctions. As Richardson explains, "soliloquy is resisted in the first act and exposed in the second act as a questionable and implicitly masculine mode". Furthermore, the disjunction between Percy Shelley's poems, spoken by Apollo and Pan in the first act, and Mary Shelley's verse drama has often bothered critics. Yet, Richardson argues that this was intended, to highlight the difference in poetic mode.

== Style and themes ==
Mary Shelley's gender concerns did not cease with generic issues. In the musical contest between Apollo and Pan in the first act, Apollo is associated with masculine characteristics, such as philosophy, science, and reason, and Pan is associated with feminine characteristics, such as sheep and nature. however, as Purinton notes, "both sing egocentric lyrics that boast of their 'instruments' and their deeds". When Apollo wins, the play appears to celebrate "male superiority". However, Pan appeals the decision to King Midas, who reverses the decision in Pan's favour, for which he is then punished. Purinton argues that the play therefore breaks down traditional gender distinctions, portraying characters with mixed gender signals. In this way, she writes, "as cross-dressed dramaturgy, then, Midas is a comedy about women's issues played out on male bodies". For her, the play dramatizes the problems with the nineteenth-century ideology of separate spheres, where women were expected to remain in the private, domestic sphere and men were expected to participate in the political, public sphere.

Shelley also uses the figure of Midas to comment on capitalism and imperialism. Midas's initial joy in acquiring gold is symbolic of contemporary England, "racing headlong into its new identity as an industrialized, consumerist society financed by political and mercantile imperialism". For Shelley, these commercial efforts are particularly masculine; Midas's ears, which symbolise emasculation, are juxtaposed to masculinising gold. Furthermore, Shelley suggests that when political leaders become feminised, they lose their political power. She draws an analogy between Midas and George III and George IV, British kings who were often viewed as feminised.

Like Percy Shelley, John Keats, and Lord Byron, Mary Shelley was rewriting the classical myths; however, like other Romantic women writers, she was challenging patriarchy in particular. Midas is not just a commentary on Ovid's version of the tale in the Metamorphoses; it is also a commentary on Geoffrey Chaucer's version in The Wife of Bath's Tale. In Ovid's version it is Midas's barber who cannot keep the secret of his ears; in Chaucer's version, it is his wife. In Mary Shelley's version, it is Midas's prime minister who cannot keep the secret; however, Midas is convinced a woman has revealed his secret and a courtier explicitly states "There is no woman here".

Proserpine and Midas are often seen as a pair of contrasting plays. Proserpine is a play of female bonding, while Midas is a male-dominated drama; male poets participate in a contest in Midas while in Proserpine female characters participate in communal storytelling; "where Midas lives in his golden palace imagining himself at the center of an all-powerful court, Ceres laments leaving the pastoral enclave she shares with Proserpine for Jove's court"; Midas focuses on gold, while the women in Proserpine enjoy flowers; and "where the society of Midas is marked by egotism, greed, and strife, the female society of Proserpine values community, gift-giving, and love".

== Reception ==
When A. Koszul first published an edited version of Midas in 1922, he argued "that the little classical fancies which Mrs. Shelley never ventured to publish are quite as worthy of consideration as her more ambitious prose works". However, his "Introduction" to the play speaks mostly of Percy Shelley and his contribution to Mary Shelley's works. In fact, as he explains, he has decided to publish to contribute to the Percy Shelley centenary. Since their original publication, neither Midas nor Proserpine has received much critical attention. Critics have either only paid attention to Percy Shelley's poems or dismissed the plays. Literary critic Elizabeth Nitchie wrote that the plays are "distinguished only by the lyrics that [Percy] Shelley wrote for them" and Sylva Norman contends that they "do not really call for analytical and comparative study". However, since the 1990s, beginning with the publication of The Other Mary Shelley, more attention has been paid to Mary Shelley's "other" works, such as her dramas.

== See also ==
- Mary Shelley bibliography

== Bibliography ==
- Cox, Jeffrey N. "Staging Hope: Genre, Myth, and Ideology in the Dramas of the Hunt Circle". Texas Studies in Language and Literature 38 (1996): 245–65.
- Pascoe, Judith. "Proserpine and Midas". The Cambridge Companion to Mary Shelley. Ed. Esther Schor. Cambridge: Cambridge University Press, 2003. ISBN 0-521-00770-4.
- Purinton, Marjean D. "Polysexualities and Romantic Generations in Mary Shelley's Mythological Dramas Midas and Proserpine". Women's Writing 6.3 (1999): 385–411.
- Richardson, Alan. "Proserpine and Midas: Gender, Genre, and Mythic Revisionism in Mary Shelley's Dramas". The Other Mary Shelley: Beyond Frankenstein. Eds. Audrey A. Fisch, Anne K. Mellor, and Esther H. Schor. New York: Oxford University Press, 1993. ISBN 0-19-507740-7.
- Seymour, Miranda. Mary Shelley. New York: Grove Press, 2000. ISBN 0-8021-3948-5.
- Shelley, Mary. Proserpine & Midas: Two Unpublished Mythological Dramas by Mary Shelley. Ed. A. Koszul. London: Humphrey Milford, 1922.
