= Mary Shelley bibliography =

Richard Rothwell, Mary Shelley, (1839-40)

This is a bibliography of works by Mary Shelley (30 August 1797 – 1 February 1851), the British novelist, short story writer, dramatist, essayist, biographer, and travel writer, best known for her Gothic novel Frankenstein: or, The Modern Prometheus (1818). She also edited and promoted the works of her husband, the Romantic poet and philosopher Percy Bysshe Shelley. Until the 1970s, Mary Shelley was known mainly for her efforts to publish Percy Shelley's works and for Frankenstein. Recent scholarship has yielded a more comprehensive view of Mary Shelley’s achievements, however. Scholars have shown increasing interest in her literary output, particularly in her novels, which include the historical novels Valperga (1823) and Perkin Warbeck (1830), the apocalyptic novel The Last Man (1826), and her final two novels, Lodore (1835) and Falkner (1837). Studies of her lesser-known works such as the travel book Rambles in Germany and Italy (1844) and the biographical articles for Dionysius Lardner's Cabinet Cyclopaedia (1829–46) support the growing view that Mary Shelley remained a political radical throughout her life. Mary Shelley's works often argue that cooperation and sympathy, particularly as practised by women in the family, were the ways to reform civil society. This view was a direct challenge to the individualistic Romantic ethos promoted by Percy Shelley and Enlightenment political theories.

Collections of Mary Shelley's papers are housed in The Abinger Collection and The Bodleian Shelley Manuscripts at the Bodleian Library, the New York Public Library (particularly The Carl H. Pforzheimer Collection of Shelley and His Circle), the Huntington Library, the British Library, and in the John Murray Collection.

The following list is based on W. H. Lyles's Mary Shelley: An Annotated Bibliography and Mary Shelley's Literary Lives and Other Writings. It lists first editions of works authored by Mary Shelley, except where indicated.

== Novels ==
Title	First publication	Notes	Online text
Frankenstein; Or, The Modern Prometheus	3 vols. London: Printed for Lackington, Hughes, Harding, Mavor, & Jones, 1818 (MS 1816-revised until 1831)	There are six important versions of Frankenstein, two manuscript and four printed: "Shelley's manuscript; the fair copy manuscript, the 1818 first edition, the 1821 second overall edition published in Paris translated into French by Jules Saladin with strong emphasis on black magic and the supernatural to which the book was the first to attribute Mary Shelley as the author of Frankenstein and the only such edition to do so during the lifetime of Percy Shelley who was said to be extremely proud of the 1821 edition. The first edition of 1818 and second overall edition of 1821 were the only editions of Frankenstein to be published as a three volume set with the 1821 edition being the rarest of all printed editions. The annotated Thomas copy, and the 1831 edition." William Godwin edited a version for the press in 1823, but he had no help from Mary Shelley and thus the edition is usually disregarded. Mary Shelley revised the 1818 text in 1831, creating a substantially new text. The editors of the Broadview Press edition of the novel write that "the 1818 and 1831 editions of Frankenstein are best treated as two separate texts". Anne K. Mellor argues that after her personal tragedies, Shelley altered the text to suggest that humans could not control their own destinies and Maurice Hindle notes that the "1831 version strips the novel of much of its context, removing a number of references to contemporary science...and Godwinian philosophy."	Frankenstein
Valperga: Or, the Life and Adventures of Castruccio, Prince of Lucca	3 vols. London: Printed for G. and W. B. Whittaker, 1823		Valperga
The Last Man	3 vols. London: Henry Colburn, 1826		Google Books (Vol. 2 of 1826 Paris ed.)
The Fortunes of Perkin Warbeck, A Romance	3 vols. London: Henry Colburn and Richard Bentley, 1830		Google Books (1857)
Lodore	3 vols. London: Richard Bentley, 1835		Google Books
Falkner. A Novel	3 vols. London: Saunders and Otley, 1837		Gutenberg
Mathilda	Ed. Elizabeth Nitchie. Chapel Hill: University of North Carolina Press, 1959.	Manuscript: MS. Abinger d. 33	Gutenberg

== Travel narratives ==
Title	Authors	First publication	Manuscript	Notes	Online text
History of a Six Weeks' Tour through a Part of France, Switzerland, Germany, and Holland: with Letters Descriptive of a Sail round the Lake of Geneva, and of the Glaciers of Chamouni	Mary Shelley and Percy Bysshe Shelley	London: T. Hookham, Jun.; and C. and J. Ollier, 1817; revised and published as "Journal of a Six Weeks' Tour" and "Letters from Geneva" in Essays from Abroad, Translations and Fragments, by Percy Bysshe Shelley. Edited by Mrs. Shelley (London: Edward Moxon, 1840); revised and published as a single volume in 1845 (London: Edward Moxon)	Two draft leaves in Mary Shelley's hand survive and are in the Abinger collection at the Bodleian library: MS. Abinger c. 63.	The Tour is Mary Shelley's first published work; it includes the first publication of Percy Shelley's poem "Mont Blanc".	History of a Six Weeks' Tour
Rambles in Germany and Italy, in 1840, 1842, and 1843	Mary Shelley	2 vols. London: Edward Moxon, 1844		Rambles is Shelley's last published work.	Rambles in Germany and Italy in 1840

== Short stories ==
- —. "A Tale of the Passions, or, the Death of Despina". The Liberal 1 (1822): 289–325.
- —. "The Bride of Modern Italy". The London Magazine 9 (1824): 351–363.
- —. "Lacy de Vere". Forget Me Not for 1827. 1826.
- —. "The Convent of Chailot". The Keepsake for MDCCCXXVIII.
- —. "Ferdinando Eboli. A Tale". The Keepsake for MDCCCXXIX. Ed. Frederic Mansel Reynolds. London: Published for the Proprietor, by Hurst, Chance, and Co., and R. Jennings, 1828.
- —. "The Mourner". The Keepsake for MDCCCXXX. Ed. Frederic Mansel Reynolds. London: Published for the Proprietor, by Hurst, Chance, and Co., and R. Jennings, 1829.
- —. "The Evil Eye. A Tale". The Keepsake for MDCCCXXX. Ed. Frederic Mansel Reynolds. London: Published for the Proprietor, by Hurst, Chance, and Co., and R. Jennings, 1829.
- —. "The False Rhyme". The Keepsake for MDCCCXXX. Ed. Frederic Mansel Reynolds. London: Published for the Proprietor, by Hurst, Chance, and Co., and R. Jennings, 1829.
- —. "The Swiss Peasant". The Keepsake for MDCCCXXXI. Ed. Frederic Mansel Reynolds. London: Published for the Proprietor, by Hurst, Chance, and Co., and R. Jennings and Chaplin, 1831.
- —. "Transformation". The Keepsake for MDCCCXXXI. Ed. Frederic Mansel Reynolds. London: Published for the Proprietor, by Hurst, Chance, and Co., and R. Jennings and Chaplin, 1831.
- —. "The Dream, A Tale". The Keepsake for MDCCCXXXII. Ed. Frederick Mansel Reynolds. London: Published by Longman, Rees, Orme, Brown, and Green, 1831.
- —. "The Brother and Sister, An Italian Story". The Keepsake for MDCCCXXXIII. Ed. Frederick Mansel Reynolds. London: Published by Longman, Rees, Orme, Brown, Green, and Longman/Paris: Rittner and Goupill/Frankfurt: Charles Jügill, 1832.
- —. "The Invisible Girl". The Keepsake for MDCCCXXXIII. Ed. Frederick Mansel Reynolds. London: Published by Longman, Rees, Orme, Brown, Green, and Longman/Paris: Rittner and Goupill/Frankfurt: Charles Jũgill, 1832.
- —. "The Smuggler and His Family". Original Compositions in Prose and Verse. London: Published by Edmund Lloyd, 1833.
- —. "The Mortal Immortal". The Keepsake for MDCCCXXXIV. Ed. Frederick Mansel Reynolds. London: Published by Longman, Rees, Orme, Brown, Green, and Longman/Paris: Rittner and Goupill/Berlin: A. Asher, 1833.
- —. "The Elder Son". Heath's Book of Beauty. 1835. Ed. Countess of Blessington. London: Longman, Rees, Orme, Brown, Green, and Longman/Paris: Rittner and Goupil/Berling: A. Asher, 1834.
- —. "The Trial of Love". The Keepsake for MDCCCXXXV. Ed. Frederick Mansel Reynolds. London: Published for Longman, Rees, Orme, Brown, Green, and Longman/Paris: Rittner and Goupill/Berlin: A. Asher, 1834.
- —. "The Parvenue". The Keepsake for MDCCCXXXVII. Ed. The Lady Emmeline Stuart Wortley. London: Published for Longman, Rees, Orme, Green, and Longman/Paris: Delloy and Co., 1836.
- —. "The Pilgrims". The Keepsake for MDCCCXXXVIII. London: Published by Longman, Orme, Brown, Green, and Longmans/Paris: delloy and Co., 1837.
- —. "Euphrasia: A Tale of Greece". The Keepsake for MDCCCXXXIX. Ed. Frederic Mansel Reynolds. London: Published for Longman, Orme, Brown, Green, and Longmans/Paris: Delloy and Co., 1838.
- —. "Roger Dodsworth: The Reanimated Englishman" (1863).
- —. "The Heir of Mondolfo".Appleton's Journal: A Monthly Miscellany of Popular Literature (NY) N.S. 2 (1877): 12–23.
- —. "Valerius: The Reanimated Roman" (1819).

Note: The short story "The Pole", published in The Court Magazine and Belle Assemblée in 1832, is often misattributed to Mary Shelley, as in its original publication, it was said to be written by "the Author of 'Frankenstein.'" However, this has since been disproven, as "The Pole" was actually written by Claire Clairmont.

== Children's literature ==
Title	Authors	First publication	Composition date	Manuscript	Notes	Online text
Proserpine	Mary Shelley and Percy Bysshe Shelley	The Winter's Wreath for 1832. London: Wittaker, Treacher, and Arnot, n[o].d[ate].	Finished by 3 April 1820	Fragment of the manuscript is in Pforzheimer Collection at the New York Public Library	Percy Shelley contributed two lyric poems: "Arethusa" and "Song of Proserpine While Gathering Flowers on the Plain of Enna". The published version of the play was cut by about one-fifth from the manuscript version.	Gutenberg
Midas	Mary Shelley and Percy Bysshe Shelley	Proserpine & Midas. Two unpublished Mythological Dramas by Mary Shelley. Ed. A. H. Koszul. London: Humphrey Milford, 1922.	1820		Percy Shelley contributed two lyric poems.	Gutenberg
Maurice; or, The Fisher's Cot	Mary Shelley	Ed. Claire Tomalin. London: Viking, 1998.	10 August 1820		This manuscript was discovered by Cristina Dazzi in Italy in 1997.	

== Articles and reviews ==
- —. "Madame D'Houtetôt". The Liberal 2 (1823): 67–83.
- —. "Giovanni Villani". The Liberal 2 (1823): 281–97.
- —. "Narrative of a Tour round the Lake of Geneva, and of an Excursion through the Valley of Chamouni". La Belle Assemblée, or Court and Fashionable Magazine NS 28 (1823): 14–19.
- —. "Recollections of Italy". The London Magazine 9 (1824): 21–26.
- —. "On Ghosts". The London Magazine 9 (1824): 253–56.
- —. "Defense of Velluti". The Examiner 958 (11 June 1826): 372–73.
- —. "The English in Italy". Westminster Review 6 (1826): 325–41.
- —. "Review of The Italian Novelists". Westminster Review 7 (1827): 115–26.
- —. "Illyrian Poems – Feudal Scenes". Westminster Review 10 (1829): 71–81.
- —. "Modern Italy". Westminster Review 11 (1829): 127–40.
- —. "Review of The Loves of the Poets". Westminster Review 11 (1829): 472–77.
- —. "Recollections of the Lake of Geneva". The Spirit and Manners of the Age 2 (1829): 913–20.
- —. "Review of Cloudesley; a Tale". Blackwood's Edinburgh Magazine 27 (1830): 711–16.
- —. "Review of 1572 Chronique du Temps de Charles IX—Par l'Auteur du Theatre de Clara Gazul". Westminster Review 13 (1830): 495–502.
- —. "Memoirs of William Godwin". William Godwin. Caleb Williams. London: Colburn and Bentley, 1831.
- —. "Review of Thomas Moore. The Life and Death of Lord Edward Fitzgerald". Westminster Review 16 (1831): 110–21.
- —. "Living Literary Characters, No. II. The Honourable Mrs. Norton". New Monthly Magazine and Literary Journal 1 (1831): 180–83.
- —. "Living Literary Characters, No. IV. James Fenimore Cooper". New Monthly Magazine and Literary Journal 1 (1831): 356–62.
- —. "Review of "The Bravo; a Venetian Story. By the Author of 'The Pilot,' 'The Borderers,' etc." [James Fenimore Cooper]. Westminster Review 16 (1832): 180–92.
- —. "Modern Italian Romances, I". Monthly Chronicle (November 1838): 415–28.
- —. "Modern Italian Romances, II". Monthly Chronicle (December 1838): 547–57.

== Translations ==
- —. "Relation of the Death of the Family of the Cenci". The Poetical Works of Percy Bysshe Shelley. Ed. Mrs. Shelley. 2nd ed. London: Edward Moxon, 1839.

== Edited works ==
- Shelley, Percy Bysshe. Posthumous Poems of Percy Bysshe Shelley. London: Printed for John and Henry L. Hunt, 1824.
- Trelawny, Edward John. Adventures of a Younger Son. London: Colburn and Bentley, 1831.
- Godwin, William, Jr. Transfusion; or, The Orphan of Unwalden. London: Macrone, 1835.
- Shelley, Percy Bysshe. The Poetical Works of Percy Bysshe Shelley. Ed. Mrs. Shelley. 4 vols. London: Edward Moxon, 1839. [2nd ed., single vol., 1839]
- Shelley, Percy Bysshe. Essays, Letters from Abroad, Translations and Fragments, by Percy Bysshe Shelley. Ed. Mrs. Shelley. 2 vols. London: Edward Moxon, 1840 [1839].

== Biographies ==
Title	Authors	First publication	Notes	Online text
Lives of the most Eminent Literary and Scientific Men of Italy, Spain, and Portugal, Vol. I	Mary Shelley and James Montgomery	Vol. 86 of The Cabinet of Biography, Conducted by the Rev. Dionysius Lardner (Lardner's Cabinet Cyclopedia). London: Printed for Longman, Orme, Brown, Green, & Longman; and John Taylor, 1835.	Authorship is uncertain regarding some of the biographies in the volume. According to Mary Shelley's Literary Lives and Other Writings, Mary Shelley wrote the following lives: Petrarch, Boccaccio, Lorenzo de'Medici, Marsiglio Ficino, Giovanni Pico della Mirandola, Angelo Poliziano, Bernardo Pulci, Luca Pulci, Luigi Pulci, Cieco Da Ferrara, Burchiello, Bojardo, Berni, Machiavelli.	Internet Archive
Lives of the most Eminent Literary and Scientific Men of Italy, Spain, and Portugal, Vol. II	Mary Shelley, James Montgomery, and Sir David Brewster	Vol. 87 of The Cabinet of Biography, Conducted by the Rev. Dionysius Lardner (Lardner's Cabinet Cyclopedia). London: Printed for Longman, Orme, Brown, Green, & Longman; and John Taylor, 1835.	Authorship is uncertain regarding some of the biographies in the volume. According to Mary Shelley's Literary Lives and Other Writings, Mary Shelley wrote the following lives: Guicciardini, Vittoria Colonna, Guarini, Chiabrera, Tassoni, Marini, Filicaja, Metastasio, Goldoni, Alfieri, Monti, Ugo Foscolo.	Internet Archive
Lives of the most Eminent Literary and Scientific Men of Italy, Spain, and Portugal, Vol. III	Mary Shelley [and others]	Vol. 88 of The Cabinet of Biography, Conducted by the Rev. Dionysius Lardner (Lardner's Cabinet Cyclopedia). London: Printed for Longman, Orme, Brown, Green, & Longman; and John Taylor, 1837.	According to Mary Shelley's Literary Lives and Other Writings, Mary Shelley wrote the biographies of: Boscan, Garcilaso de la Vega, Diego Hurtado de Mendoza, Luis de Leon, Herrera, Saa de Miranda, Jorge de Montemayor, Castillejo, Cervantes, Lope de Vega, Vicente Espinel, Estaban de Villegas, Góngora, Quevedo, Calderón, Ribeyro, Gil Vicente, Ferreira, Camoens.	Internet Archive
Lives of the most Eminent Literary and Scientific Men of France, Vol. I	Mary Shelley [and others]	Vol. 102 of The Cabinet of Biography, Conducted by the Rev. Dionysius Lardner (Lardner's Cabinet Cyclopedia). London: Printed for Longman, Orme, Brown, Green, & Longman; and John Taylor, 1838.	According to Mary Shelley's Literary Lives and Other Writings, Mary Shelley wrote the following biographies: Montaigne, Corneille, Rouchefoucauld, Molière, Pascal, Madame de Sévigné, Boileau, Racine, Fénélon.	Internet Archive
Lives of the most Eminent Literary and Scientific Men of France, Vol. II	Mary Shelley	Vol. 103 of The Cabinet of Biography, Conducted by the Rev. Dionysius Lardner (Lardner's Cabinet Cyclopedia). London: Printed for Longman, Orme, Brown, Green, & Longman; and John Taylor, 1839.	This volume contains the following biographies: Voltaire, Rousseau, Condorcet, Mirabeau, Madame Roland, Madame de Stael.	Internet Archive
Life of William Godwin	Mary Shelley	Unfinished and unpublished; Edited from the manuscripts in the Abinger Collection, Bodleian Library, Oxford by Pamela Clemit in 'Literary Lives,' Vol. 4, 3-113.		

== Poems ==
Poem	First publication	Manuscript	Attribution	Composition date
"Absence; 'Ah! he is gone—and I alone!—'"	The Keepsake for MDCCCXXXI. Ed. Frederic Mansel Reynolds. London: Published for the Proprietor, by Hurst, Chance, and Co., and Jennings and Chaplin, 1830.	British Library, Ashley MS A 4023, fair copy in MS's handwriting		
"A Dirge; 'This morn, thy gallant bark, love'"	The Keepsake for MDCCCXXXI. Ed. Frederic Mansel Reynolds. London: Published for the Proprietor, by Hurst, Chance, and Co., and Jennings and Chaplin, 1830.	Earliest extant manuscript at Harvard University fMS. Eng. 822, dated November 1827; second manuscript in a letter MS wrote to Maria Gisborne on 11 June 1835		November 1827 and 11 June 1835
"A Night Scene; 'I see thee not, my gentlest Isabel'"	The Keepsake for MDCCCXXXI. Ed. Frederic Mansel Reynolds. London: Published for the Proprietor, by Hurst, Chance, and Co., and Jennings and Chaplin, 1830.		Published anonymously in the Keepsake, first attributed by Nitchie and confirmed by Palacio through a sales catalogue listing an autograph poem called "A Night Scene"	
"Song; 'When I'm no more, this harp that rings'"	The Keepsake for MDCCCXXXI. Ed. Frederic Mansel Reynolds. London: Published for the Proprietor, by Hurst, Chance, and Co., and Jennings and Chaplin, 1830.		This poem is included in Lyles's bibliography but not in the more recent Markley edition of MS's works.	
"The Death of Love"	Bennett, Betty T. "Newly Uncovered Letters and Poems by Mary Wollstonecraft Shelley". Keats-Shelley Journal 46 (1997): 51–74.	The only surviving manuscript, dated 19 November 1831, is found in an autograph album owned by Birkbeck, University of London and entitled "Mrs. G. Birkbeck / ALBUM / September, MDCCCXXV".	This poem is listed in Markley but not in Lyles.	19 November 1831
"To Love in Solitude and Mystery"	The Keepsake for MDCCCXXXIII. Ed. Frederic Mansel Reynolds. London: Longmans, Rees, Orme, Brown and Green, 1832.	Pforzheimer Collection, New York Public Library	Published anonymously. Attribution was first suggested by Emily W. Sunstein and confirmed in Bennett, Betty T. "Newly Uncovered Letters and Poems by Mary Wollstonecraft Shelley". Keats-Shelley Journal 46 (1997): 51–74. This poem is included in Markley's edition of MS's works but not in Lyles's bibliography.	
"I Must Forget Thy Dark Eyes' Love-Fraught Gaze"	The Keepsake for MDCCCXXXIII. Ed. Frederic Mansel Reynolds. London: Longmans, Rees, Orme, Brown and Green, 1832.	Berg Collection, New York Public Library	Published anonymously. Attributed by Emily Sunstein. This poem is included in Markley's edition of MS's works but not in Lyles's bibliography.	
"Ode to Ignorance; 'Hail, Ignorance! majestic queen!'"	The Metropolitan Magazine 9 (1834): 29–31.		This poem is included in Lyles's bibliography but not in the more recent Markley edition of MS's works.	
"Fame"	The Drawing-Room Scrap-Book. 1835. 1834.		This poem is included in Lyles's bibliography but not in the more recent Markley edition of MS's works.	
"How like a star you rose upon my life"	The Keepsake for MDCCCXXXIX. Ed. Frederick Mansel Reynolds. London: Published for Longman, Orme, Brown, Green, and Longmans/Paris: Delloy and Co., 1838.			
"To the Death; 'O, Come to me in dreams, my love'"	The Keepsake for MDCCCXXXIX. Ed. Frederic Mansel Reynolds. London: Longman, Orme, Brown, Green, and Longmans, 1839.	Collection of Samuel Loveman		15 December 1834
"Oh Listen While I sing to Thee," Canzonet, With Accompaniment for the Harp or Piano Forte, Composed and Inscribed to his Friend Berry King, Esqr. by Henry Hugh Pearson, Professor of Music in the University of Edinburgh	London: D'Almaine and Co. [c.1842]	Bodleian Library and British Library		12 March 1838
The Choice. a Poem on Shelley's Death by Mary Wollstonecraft Shelley	Ed. Harry Buxton Forman. London: Printed for the Editor for Private Distribution, 1876.	Two versions of the poem exist: One is the Forman edition, drawn from a manuscript sent to Forman, and the other is in MS's journal (Ab. Dep. 311/4, pp. 100–06).		May – July 1823
"On Reading Wordsworth's Lines on Peel [sic] Castle; 'It is with me, as erst with you"	Grylls, Rosalie Glynn. Mary Shelley: A Biography. London: Oxford University Press, 1938.	Two manuscripts survive, both dated 8 December 1825: Ab. Dep. c. 516 and Ab. Dep. d. 311/4. The second manuscript version was published in Grylls.		8 December 1825
"Fragment; (To Jane with the Last [Man]) 'Tribute for thee, dear solace of my life'"	Grylls, Rosalie Glynn. Mary Shelley: A Biography. London: Oxford University Press, 1938.	Ab. Dep. d. 311/4, p. 109		c. 23 January 1826
"Tempo e' piu di Morire/Io ho tardato piu ch' i' non vorrei: 'Sadly borne across the waves'"	Ed. Elizabeth Nitchie. Mary Shelley: Author of Frankenstein. New Brunswick: Rutgers University Press, 1953.	Bodleian MS Shelley adds. c. 5, f. 101		1833
"La Vida es sueño; 'The tide of Time was at my feet'"	1833 version published by Jean de Palacio in 1969; 1834 version published in Ed. Elizabeth Nitchie. Mary Shelley: Author of Frankenstein. New Brunswick: Rutgers University Press, 1953.	Personal collection of Jean de Palacio and Bodleian MS Shelley adds. c. 5, f. 101		26 July 1833 and 1834
"Fair Italy! Still Shines Thy Sun as Bright"	Bennett, Betty T. "Newly Uncovered Letters and Poems by Mary Wollstonecraft Shelley". Keats-Shelley Journal 46 (1997): 51–74.	Fales Manuscript Collection, Fales Library, New York University	This poem is included in Markley's edition of MS's works but not in Lyles's bibliography.	10 September 1833

== Journals and letters ==
- —. The Journals of Mary Shelley, 1814–44. Ed. Paula R. Feldman and Diana Scott-Kilvert. Baltimore: Johns Hopkins University Press, 1995. ISBN 0-8018-5088-6.
- —. The Letters of Mary Wollstonecraft Shelley. 3 vols. Ed. Betty T. Bennett. Baltimore: Johns Hopkins University Press, 1980. ISBN 0-8018-2275-0.

== Fragments ==
Title	Composition date	Manuscript	Summary	Notes
"History of the Jews"	c. 1812–16	Ab. Dep. c. 477/2, ff. 22-37	This fragment is written in MS's handwriting and "draws on particularly passages in the Old Testament books of Genesis, Exodus, Joshua and Judges and follows a common 'Jacobin' mode in which the veracity of the Old Testament is disproved by foregrounding absurdities and inconsistencies in the narrative, the ultimate aim being to undermine the tenets of Christianity by taking apart the credibility of its foundation in the Hebrew scriptures". Jane Blumberg has attributed it to MS (but with a strong influence from PBS). Others believe it to be a translation of an unknown French anti-clerical work. It could also be a dictated work.	This fragment is included in Markley but not in Lyles.
"Theseus"	1815?	Ab. Dep. c. 477/2, ff. 20-1	This fragment describes Theseus, drawing on Plutarch's Parallel Lives.	This fragment is included in Markley but not in Lyles.
"Cyrus"	1815?	Ab. Dep. c. 477/1, f.63 and Ab. Dep. c. 534/1, f. 95	This fragment is a brief life of Cyrus the Great of Persia and a summary of the achievements of ancient Chaldea, India, and Egypt.	This fragment is included in Markley but not in Lyles.
"Address to the Duchess of Angoulême"	c. 1815–16	Bodleian MS Shelley adds. c. 5, f. 92-93	This is a fragment written in MS's handwriting of an "imaginary address from a dead speaker in the manner of Lucian's Dialogues of the Dead". The addressee is Marie-Thérèse Charlotte, Duchess d'Angoulême, the only surviving child of Louis XVI and Marie Antoinette and the leader of an Ultra-Royalist party following Napoleon's defeat. The speaker in Mary I of England. MS may have written this work herself, may have taken this work in dictation from PBS, or the two may have authored it together.	This fragment is included in Markley but not in Lyles.
"Correspondence of Louis XVI"	1816	Ab. Dep. c. 477/2, ff. 1-19	This fragment is a partial translation of Correspondance politique et confidentielle inédite de Louis XIV, Avec ses frères, et plusieurs personnes célèbres, pendant les dernières années de son règne, et jusqu'à sa mort, avec des observations par Hélene-Maria Williams. 2 vols. Paris: Debray, 1803.	This fragment is included in Markley but not in Lyles.
"Cupid and Psyche"	November 1817	Library of Congress MSS 13,290, pp. 35–65 and Bodleian MS Shelley adds. e. 2	This fragment is a partial translation of the tale of "Cupid and Psyche" from Apuleius's Golden Ass.	This fragment is included in Markley but not in Lyles.
"Samuel"	1819-20	Ab. Dep. e. 274, pp. 3–24	This fragment is an abridgement of the first fifteen chapters of the 1 Samuel. It may be modelled on William Godwin's children's book Bible Stories (1802).	This fragment is included in Markley but not in Lyles.
"The Necessity of a Belief in the Heathen Mythology to a Christian"	1820	Ab. Dep. e. 274, pp. 102 rev.-97 rev., 92 rev.	This fragment is a "gathering of notes (with touches of dry wit) towards an argumentative essay". According to Markley, "its purpose appears strategic: to undermine the claims of Judaeo-Christian scriptures in order to assert the beauty and superior morality of classical myth".	This fragment is included in Markley but not in Lyles.
"Cry of War to the Greeks"	2–5 April 1821	Bodleian MS Shelley adds. c. 5, ff. 91, 34	This fragment is an unfinished rough draft translation of the Greek patriot and war-leader's Alexander Ypsilanti's call to arms. The finished copy was sent to London to accompany pro-Greek newspaper articles, but has disappeared. The translation is a collaborative effort between MS and PBS.	This fragment is included in Markley but not in Lyles.
"Life of Shelley"	10 February 1823, 2 March 1823, and 25 March 1823	Bodleian MS Shelley adds. c. 5 ff. 113-118	This fragment "presents a vivid portrait of Mary Shelley in the early stages of her widowhood...The fragments include an assessment of [Percy Bysshe Shelley's] personality and character and some anecdotes of his boyhood found nowhere else."	This fragment is included in Markley but not in Lyles.
"God of the Best the Brightest"	30 December 1824 and 6 January 1825	Pierpont Morgan Library, MA 406	This poetic fragment may be a quotation from another writer. It has now been identified as a quotation from "I Cannot Love this England" in Ancient Poetry and Romances of Spain, trans. John Bowring (1824); p. 16	
"Alas I weep my life away"	14 August 1831	Journal V, Ab. Dep. d. 311/5	This poetic fragment, thought to be possibly a quotation from another writer .	
"Struggle no more, my Soul with the sad chains"	16 August 1831	Journal V, Ab. Dep. d. 311/5	This poetic fragment may be a quotation from another writer or it may be by MS.	
"Cecil"	1844	Ab. Dep. 3. 229, pp. 1–32	"Cecil" is a partial translation of Ida Hahn-Hahn's German novel of that name.	Among the last known writing projects undertaken by Mary Shelley. This fragment is included in Markley but not in Lyles.
"Inez de Medina"	1848-50	Ab. Dep. c. 767/3, pp. 129–46, 147-164	This fragment is a partial translation of the novel Inez de Medina by Laura Galloni.	This is the last known work-in-progress by Mary Shelley. This fragment is included in Markley but not in Lyles.

== Bibliography ==
- Crook, Nora, Gen. ed. Mary Shelley's Literary Lives and Other Writings. 4 vols. London: Pickering & Chatto, 2002. ISBN 1-85196-716-8.
- Crook, Nora, Gen. ed. The Novels and Selected Works of Mary Shelley. 8 vols. London: Pickering & Chatto, 1996. ISBN 1-85196-076-7.
- Lyles, W. H. Mary Shelley: An Annotated Bibliography. New York: Garland Publishing, 1975. ISBN 0-8240-9993-1.
- Robinson, Charles E., Ed. Mary Shelley: Collected Tales and Stories. Baltimore: Johns Hopkins University Press, 1976. ISBN 0-8018-4062-7.
