= Proserpine (play) =

1832 play by Mary Shelley and Percy Bysshe Shelley

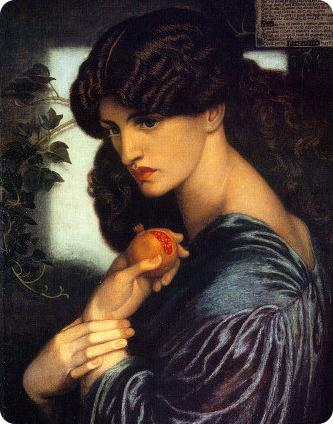
Proserpine by Dante Gabriel Rossetti (1874)

Proserpine is a verse drama written for children by the English Romantic writers Mary Shelley and her husband Percy Bysshe Shelley. Mary wrote the blank verse drama and Percy contributed two lyric poems. Composed in 1820 while the Shelleys were living in Italy, it is often considered a partner to the Shelleys' play Midas. Proserpine was first published in the London periodical The Winter's Wreath in 1832. Whether the drama was ever intended to be staged is a point of debate among scholars.

The drama is based on Ovid's tale of the abduction of Proserpine by Pluto, which itself was based on the Greek myth of Demeter and Persephone. Mary Shelley's version focuses on the female characters. In a largely feminist retelling from Ceres's point of view, Shelley emphasises the separation of mother and daughter and the strength offered by a community of women. Ceres represents life and love, and Pluto represents death and violence. The genres of the text also reflect gender debates of the time. Percy contributed in the lyric verse form traditionally dominated by men; Mary created a drama with elements common to early nineteenth-century women's writing: details of everyday life and empathetic dialogue.

Proserpine is part of a female literary tradition which, as feminist literary critic Susan Gubar describes it, has used the story of Ceres and Proserpine to "re-define, to re-affirm and to celebrate female consciousness itself". However, the play has been both neglected and marginalised by critics.

== Background ==
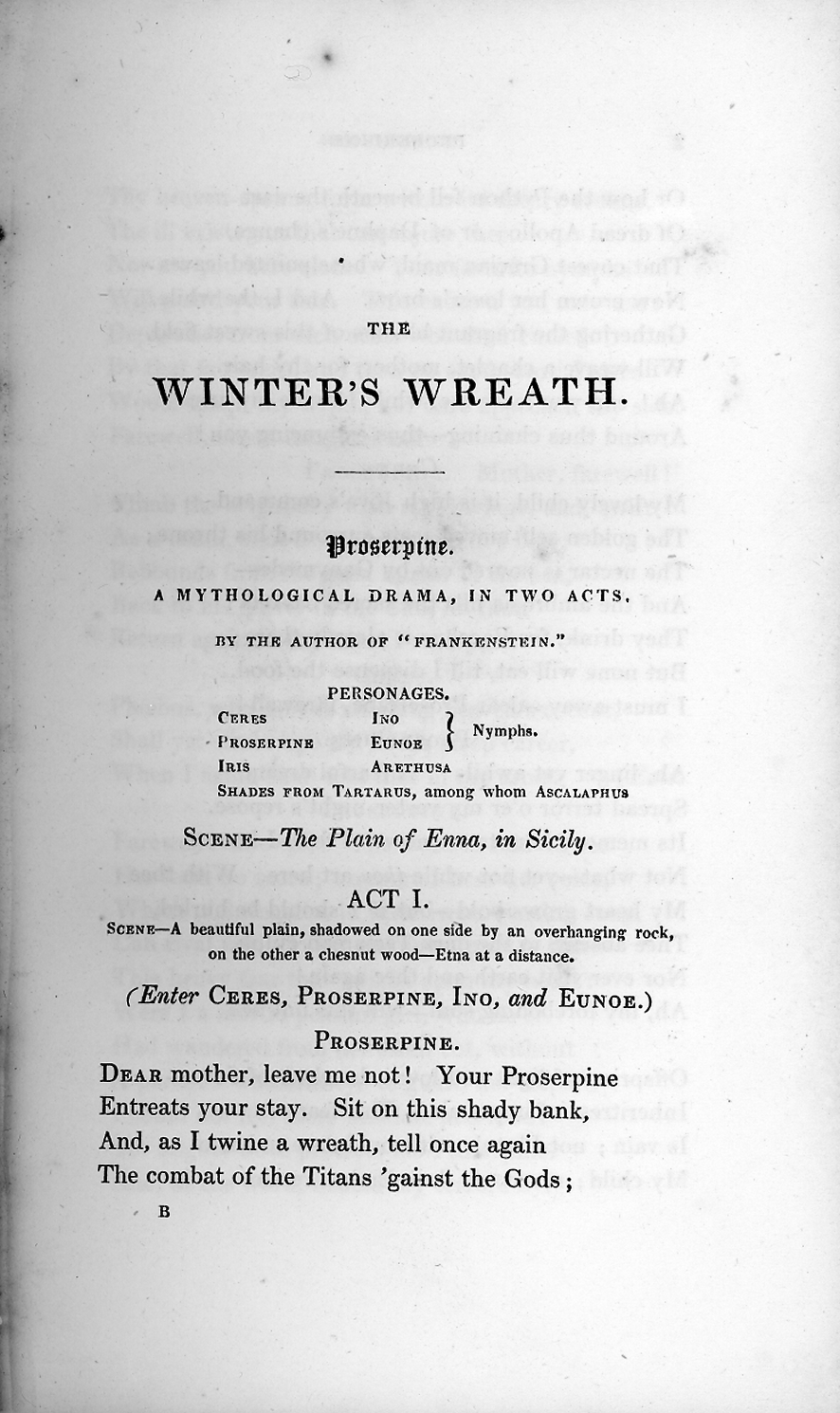
Proserpine as it was first published in the Winter's Wreath in 1832.

In March 1818 the Shelleys moved to Italy, where their two young children, Clara and William, soon died. Mary entered into a deep depression and became alienated from Percy. She recovered to some extent with the birth of her son Percy later in 1819.

Between 1818 and 1820, she absorbed a considerable amount of drama, reading many of William Shakespeare's plays, some with Percy. Percy believed that Mary had a talent for dramatic writing, and convinced her to study the great English, French, Latin, and Italian plays as well as dramatic theory. He even sought her advice on his play The Cenci, and she transcribed the manuscript of his drama Prometheus Unbound. The Shelleys also attended operas, ballets, and plays. Percy also encouraged Mary to translate Vittorio Alfieri's play Mirra (1785), a tragedy about father-daughter incest which influenced her own novel Mathilda.

Mary Shelley's studies were broad during these years. She began to learn Greek in 1820 and read widely. She had also been reading Ovid's Metamorphoses since at least 1815 and continued to do so in 1820. Her other reading included Jean-Jacques Rousseau's philosophical treatise Emile (1762) and his sentimental novel La nouvelle Héloïse (1761), as well as Thomas Day's children's book The History of Sandford and Merton (1783–89). Critic Marjean Purinton notes that her reading around the time she was composing Proserpine included "educational treatises and children's literature, replete with moralisms concerning gendered behaviors", as well as her mother Mary Wollstonecraft's Thoughts on the Education of Daughters (1787) and Original Stories from Real Life (1788). These latter were part of the conduct book tradition that challenged the gender roles of women.

== Composition and publication ==
Mary Shelley composed Proserpine in 1820, finishing it on 3 April according to her journal. Percy Shelley contributed two lyric poems: "Arethusa" and "Song of Proserpine While Gathering Flowers on the Plain of Enna". A fragment of the manuscript survives, housed in the Pforzheimer Collection at the New York Public Library, and demonstrates the couple working side-by-side on the project. According to their friend Thomas Medwin, Percy enjoyed the play, sometimes altering the manuscript as he was reading. In her biography of Mary Shelley, Miranda Seymour speculates that both Midas and Proserpine were written for two young girls Mary Shelley met and befriended, Laurette and Nerina Tighe, daughters of friends of the Shelleys in Italy. Their mother was also a former pupil of Mary Wollstonecraft, Mary Shelley's mother. That same year, Mary Shelley wrote the children's story Maurice for Laurette.

In 1824 Mary Shelley submitted Proserpine for publication to The Browning Box, edited by Bryan Walter Procter, but it was rejected. The play was first published in 1832 in the London periodical The Winter's Wreath. She cut one-fifth of the play—about 120 lines—for this version, deleting some of the stories from the first act, including Percy's poem "Arethusa", and rewrote individual lines. (She included "Arethusa" in her collection of Posthumous Poems of Percy Shelley in 1824.) Mary Shelley also added an ominous dream to the play, foreshadowing Proserpine's abduction. Her efforts to publish the play in these periodicals and journal entries written during the play's composition suggest that Proserpine was meant to be children's literature.

== Plot summary ==
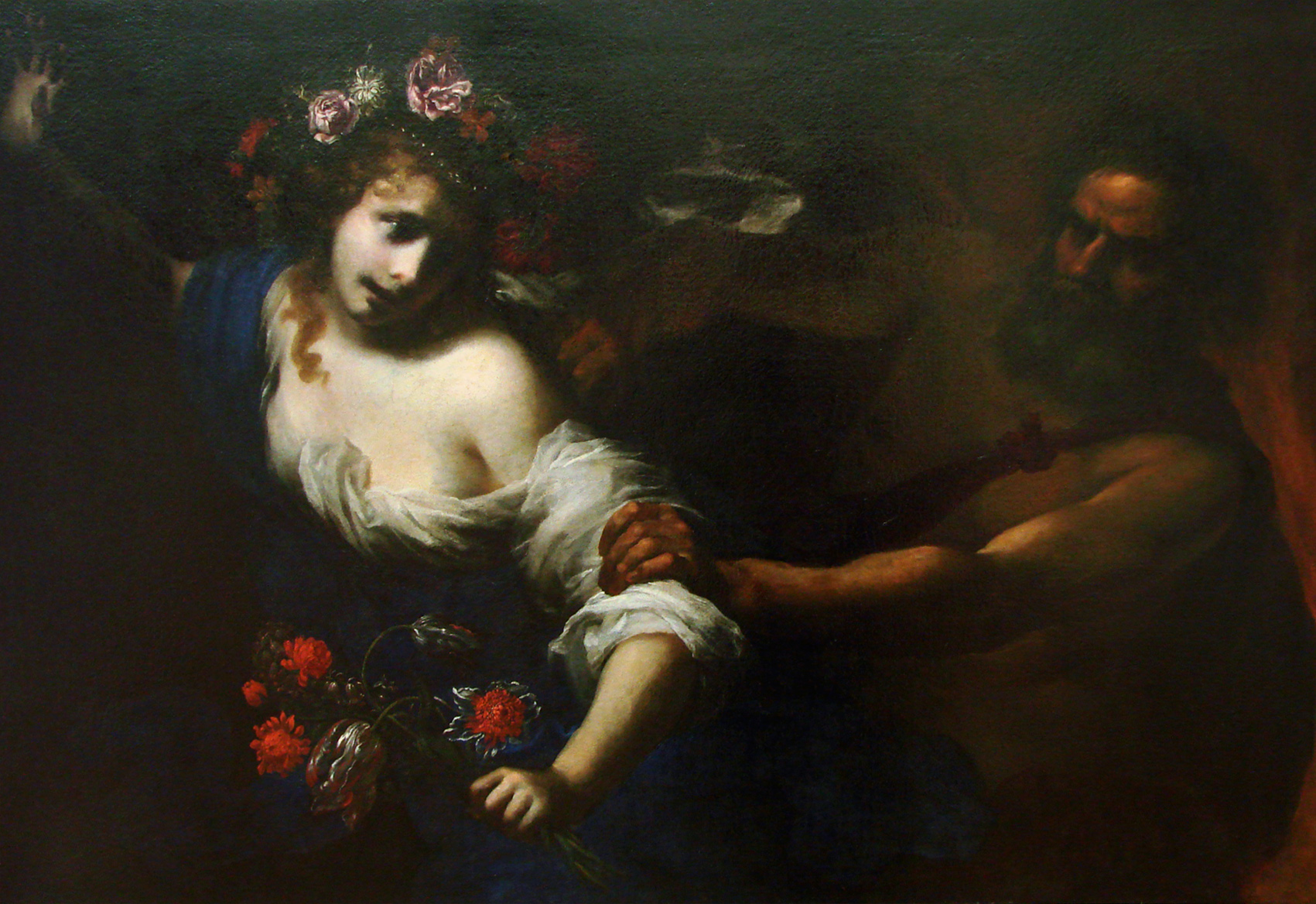
The Rape of Persephone by Simone Pignoni (c. 1650)

Act I begins with Ceres leaving her daughter Proserpine in the protection of two nymphs, Ino and Eunoe, warning them not to wander. Proserpine asks Ino to tell her a story, and she recites the tale of Arethusa. After the story, the group gathers flowers. The two nymphs wander off, seeking ever more flowers, and lose sight of Proserpine. When they return, she is gone. They search for her in vain. Ceres returns, angry and frightened at the loss of her child:

I will away, and on the highest top
Of snowy Etna, kindle two clear flames.
Night shall not hide her from my anxious search,
No moment will I rest, or sleep, or pause
Till she returns, until I clasp again
My only loved one, my lost Proserpine.

Act II begins some time later. Ino laments: "How all is changed since that unhappy eve! / Ceres forever weeps, seeking her child / And in her rage has struck the land with blight". Arethusa comes, to tell Ceres that she saw Pluto make off with Proserpine. Ceres appeals to Jove for assistance, and Iris appears, saying that Proserpine's fate is fixed. However, Jove agrees that if Proserpine does not eat the food of the Underworld, she can return. The group leaves to fetch Proserpine, who believes she has not consumed any tainted food, but she is reminded by Ascalaphus, a shade of the Underworld, of some pomegranate seeds that she ate. Ceres, Ino, and Arethusa volunteer to exile themselves to the Underworld, taking their treasures, such as fertility, with them. However, their sacrifice is not permitted. Iris relates Jove's decision regarding Proserpine's fate:

When Enna is starred by flowers, and the sun
Shoots his hot rays strait on the gladsome land,
When Summer reigns, then thou shalt live on Earth,
And tread these plains, or sporting with your nymphs,
Or at your Mother's side, in peaceful joy.
But when hard frost congeals the bare, black ground,
The trees have lost their leaves, & painted birds
Wailing for food sail through the piercing air;
Then you descend to deepest night and reign
Great Queen of Tartarus.

Ceres promises that only during the time when Proserpine lives with her will the earth be fertile.

== Genre ==
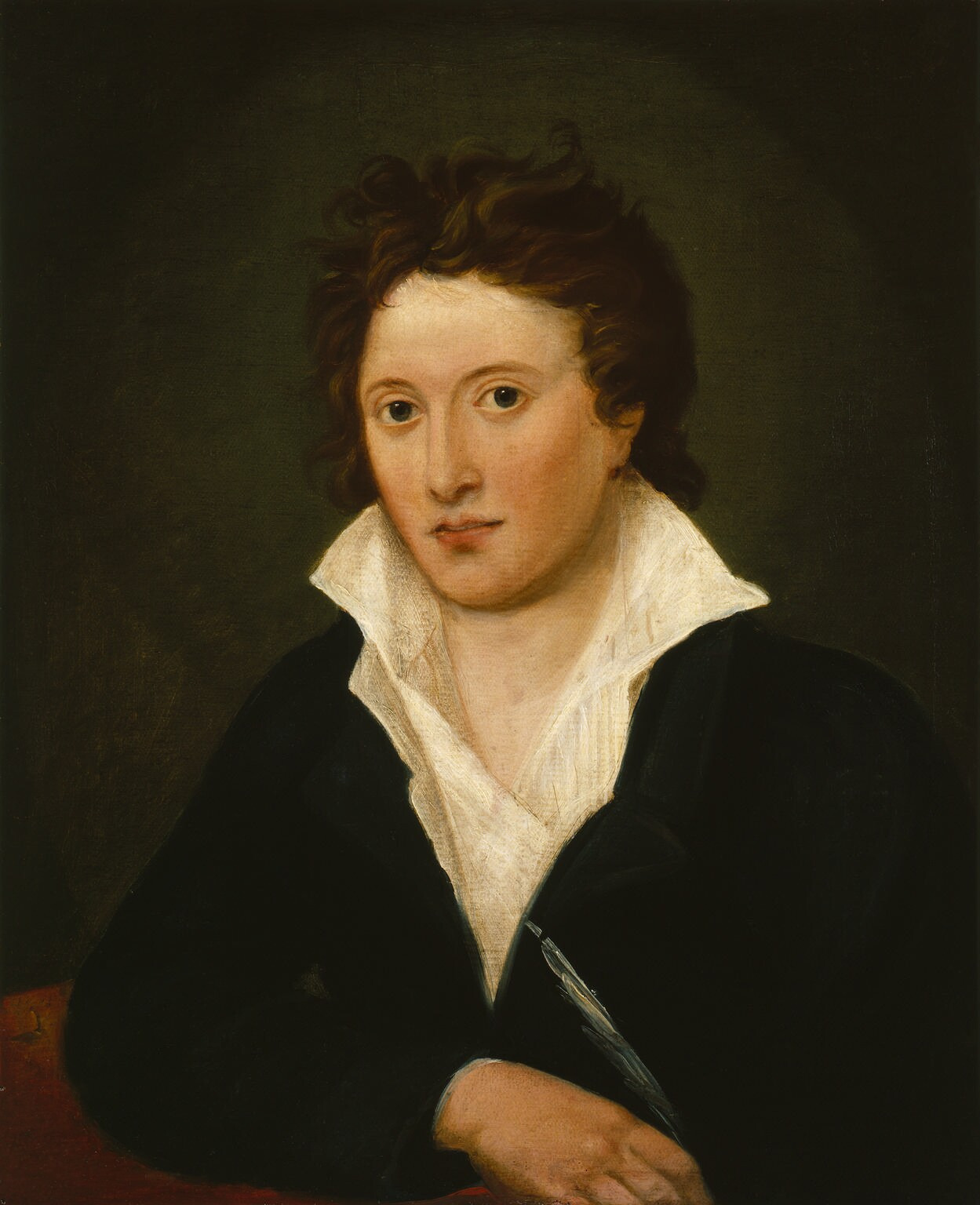
Percy Bysshe Shelley wrote about Proserpine in his poem Prometheus Unbound.

Proserpine is a verse drama in blank verse by Mary Shelley which includes two lyric poems by Percy Shelley. In the early nineteenth century, lyric poetry was associated with male poets, and quotidian poetry (i.e., the poetry of the everyday) with female poets. The division of labour in Proserpine reflects this trend. Percy's poems help emphasise the mythic nature of Proserpine's story; he continued this transcendental description of Proserpine in his Prometheus Unbound. Mary's drama consists of carefully described objects, such as flowers. Furthermore, her characters do not speak in soliloquy—except in Percy's poems—rather, "nearly every speech is directed feelingly toward another character and is typically concerned with describing another's emotional state, and/or eliciting an emotional reaction." Dialogue in Proserpine is founded on empathy, not the conflict more typical of drama. Mary Shelley also refused to embrace the visual sensationalism of early nineteenth-century theatre, focusing instead on "scenes of heightened emotion".

Scholars have disputed whether or not Mary Shelley intended her play to be staged. Most concur that it was never meant for performance, agreeing with Romanticist Alan Richardson that the play is "lyrical drama" or "mental theater" in the style of Romantic closet drama "with its emphasis on character over plot, on reaction over action, and its turn away from the theater". However, eighteenth-century theatrical scholar Judith Pascoe challenges this conclusion, pointing to detailed stage directions in the manuscript: "Ceres and her companions are ranged on one side in eager expectation; from the cave on the other, enter Proserpine, attended by various dark & gloomy shapes bearing torches; among which Ascalaphus. Ceres & Persephone embrace;–her nymphs surround her." From this evidence, she argues that Shelley intended her play to be staged.

Literary scholar Jeffrey Cox has argued that Proserpine, along with Midas, Prometheus Unbound and other plays written by the Leigh Hunt circle, were "not a rejection of the stage but an attempt to remake it". Turning from the traditional genres of tragedy and comedy of manners, these writers reinvented drama by writing masques and pastoral dramas. He argues that Midas and Proserpine are a pair of mythological dramas that demonstrate "the forces of oppression". For him, Proserpine "celebrates a pastoral world...threatened by male sexual violence and the tyranny of a sky god".

== Themes ==
Mary Shelley's version of the Proserpine myth is a feminist retelling.

Mary Shelley expanded and revised the Roman poet Ovid's story of Proserpine, which is part of his larger Metamorphoses. The tale is based on the Greek myth of Demeter and Persephone, which explains the change of the seasons through Persephone's visits to the Underworld: when she is confined to Hades's realm, autumn and winter cover the earth, and when she returns to live with her mother, spring and summer bloom. The myth depicts the victory of male violence over female procreation. Like Percy Shelley, John Keats, and Lord Byron, Mary Shelley was interested in rewriting the classical myths; however, like other Romantic women writers, she was particularly interested in challenging their patriarchal themes. In revising the Proserpine myth, she placed women and their power at the centre of the narrative. For example, Ovid represents Proserpine as "an unreflective child, willfully straying after flowers in infantile abandon" while "Shelley portrays Proserpine as a thoughtful, empathetic adolescent" who wants to find flowers for her mother. Ovid's version of the myth focuses on violence, particularly the abduction and rape of Proserpine, while Shelley's play focuses on the suspenseful search for Proserpine. Her version highlights Ceres and the nymphs' grief and Proserpine's own desire to escape from the Underworld instead of the rape (the rape happens offstage). In contrast, other nineteenth-century adaptations often expanded the rape scene, romanticising it and turning it into a scene of courtship.

Women and women's issues dominate Mary Shelley's drama—no male characters appear, with the brief exception of Ascalaphus. However, as Romanticist Marjean Purinton argues, there is a strong masculine presence in the play even without male characters, suggesting "the ubiquitous presence of patriarchal power in the domestic sphere". Although the myth is fundamentally about rape and male tyranny, Shelley transforms it into a story about female solidarity and community—these women are storytellers and mythmakers who determine their own fate. Ceres's love—a mother's love—challenges the power of the gods. Shelley tells the story almost entirely from Ceres's point of view; "her play elegiacally praises female creativity and fecundity as 'Leaf, and blade, and bud, and blossom.' " Shelley writes active, rather than passive, roles for Proserpine and Ceres. For example, it is Ceres's anger, not her grief, that brings "winter's blight". However, Proserpine's abduction is prefigured in the story of Arethusa and, as literary scholar Julie Carlson points out, the women can only join after Proserpine has been abducted.

In Shelley's version of the myth, paradise is lost not through the fault of women but through the interference of men. Pluto's "egotistical, predatory violence" is juxtaposed with Ceres's "loving kindness, her willingness to sustain life, [and] her unswerving devotion to her child". Sex, in this myth, is represented as a separation from the feminine and a forced surrender to the masculine. Pluto's domination of Proserpine symbolises "a culture based on acquisition and brutality, a culture that covertly justifies (when it does not overtly celebrate) male mastery".

Proserpine and Midas are often seen as a pair of contrasting plays. Proserpine is a play of female bonding, while Midas is a male-dominated drama; male poets participate in a contest in Midas while in Proserpine female characters participate in communal storytelling; "where Midas lives in his golden palace imagining himself at the center of an all-powerful court, Ceres laments leaving the pastoral enclave she shares with Proserpine for Jove's court"; Midas focuses on gold, while the women in Proserpine enjoy flowers; and "where the society of Midas is marked by egotism, greed, and strife, the female society of Proserpine values community, gift-giving, and love".

== Legacy and reception ==
As feminist literary critic Susan Gubar argues, Mary Shelley's drama is part of a female literary tradition, including Elizabeth Barrett Browning, H.D., Toni Morrison, Margaret Atwood, and Doris Lessing, which has responded to the story of Ceres and Proserpine. These writers use the myth as a "way of dealing with their experience of themselves as daughters growing up into womanhood and potential motherhood....they use the myth of Demeter and Persephone to re-define, to re-affirm and to celebrate female consciousness itself." Poets such as Dorothy Wellesley, Rachel Annand Taylor, Babette Deutsch, and Helen Wolfert as well as Mary Shelley portray the procreative mother as a heroine who creates an arena for nurturing relationships that challenge "the divisions between self and other" that rest at the centre of patriarchy. Feminist poet Adrienne Rich writes that "the loss of the daughter to the mother, the mother to the daughter, is the essential female tragedy", and it is this tragedy that Mary Shelley discusses in her play.

When A. Koszul first published a transcription of Proserpine in 1922, he argued "that the little classical fancies which Mrs. Shelley never ventured to publish are quite as worthy of consideration as her more ambitious prose works". However, his "Introduction" to the play speaks mostly of Percy Shelley and his contribution to Mary Shelley's works. In fact, as he explains, he decided to publish to contribute to the Percy Shelley centenary. Since their original publication, neither Midas nor Proserpine has received much critical attention. Critics have either paid attention only to Percy Shelley's poems, or have ignored the plays altogether. Literary critic Elizabeth Nitchie writes that the plays are "distinguished only by the lyrics that [Percy] Shelley wrote for them", and Sylvia Norman contends that they "do not really call for analytical and comparative study". While Frankenstein has remained a powerful cultural force since its publication, Mary Shelley's other works have rarely been reprinted and scholars have focused almost exclusively on Mary Shelley, author of Frankenstein, and Mary Shelley, wife of Percy Bysshe Shelley. However, with the publication of works by Mary Poovey and Anne K. Mellor in the 1980s and The Other Mary Shelley in 1993, more attention has been paid to Mary Shelley's "other" works, such as her dramas.

== See also ==
- Mary Shelley bibliography

== Bibliography ==
- Caretti, Laura. "'Dear Mother, Leave Me Not!' Mary Shelley and the Myth of Proserpine". Mary versus Mary. Eds. Lilla Maria Crisafulli and Giovanna Silvani. Naples: Liguori, 2001. ISBN 88-207-3257-2.
- Carlson, Julie. "Coming After: Shelley's Proserpine". Texas Studies in Literature and Language 41.4 (1999): 351–72.
- Cox, Jeffrey N. "Staging Hope: Genre, Myth, and Ideology in the Dramas of the Hunt Circle". Texas Studies in Language and Literature 38 (1996): 245–65.
- Campobasso, Maria Giovanna "Revising Ovid's Metamorphoses: Dramatizing the mythical in Mary Shelley's Proserpine ". "LAM" 6 (2017): 5-32.
- Fisch, Audrey A, Anne K. Mellor, and Esther H. Schor. "Introduction". The Other Mary Shelley: Beyond Frankenstein. Eds. Audrey A. Fisch, Anne K. Mellor, and Esther H. Schor. New York: Oxford University Press, 1993. ISBN 0-19-507740-7.
- Gubar, Susan. "Mother, Maiden and the Marriage of Death: Woman Writers and an Ancient Myth". Women's Studies 6 (1979): 301–315.
- Morrison, Lucy and Staci Stone. A Mary Shelley Encyclopedia. Westport, CT: Greenwood Press, 2003. ISBN 0-313-30159-X.
- Pascoe, Judith. "Proserpine and Midas". The Cambridge Companion to Mary Shelley. Ed. Esther Schor. Cambridge: Cambridge University Press, 2003. ISBN 0-521-00770-4.
- Peck, Walter Edwin. "Shelley Corrections in the Original draft of Mary's Two-Act Drama of "Proserpine" (1820)". Nation & The Athenaeum 28 (19 March 1921): 876–77.
- Purinton, Marjean D. "Polysexualities and Romantic Generations in Mary Shelley's Mythological Dramas Midas and Proserpine". Women's Writing 6.3 (1999): 385–411.
- Richardson, Alan. "Proserpine and Midas: Gender, Genre, and Mythic Revisionism in Mary Shelley's Dramas". The Other Mary Shelley: Beyond Frankenstein. Eds. Audrey A. Fisch, Anne K. Mellor, and Esther H. Schor. New York: Oxford University Press, 1993. ISBN 0-19-507740-7.
- Seymour, Miranda. Mary Shelley. New York: Grove Press, 2000. ISBN 0-8021-3948-5.
- Shelley, Mary. Mary Shelley's Literary Lives and Other Writings. Vol. 4. Eds. Pamela Clemit and A. A. Markley. London: Pickering and Chatto. 2002. ISBN 978-1-85196-716-2.
- Shelley, Mary. Mythological dramas: Proserpine and Midas Together with relation of the death of the family of the Cenci. Eds. Charles E. Robinson and Betty T. Bennett. New York: Garland, 1992. ISBN 0-8240-6986-2.
- Shelley, Mary. Proserpine & Midas: Two unpublished Mythological Dramas by Mary Shelley. Ed. A. Koszul. London: Humphrey Milford, 1922.
- Smith, Johanna M. Mary Shelley. New York: Twayne, 1996. ISBN 0-8057-7045-3.
- Sunstein, Emily W. Mary Shelley: Romance and Reality. 1989. Baltimore: Johns Hopkins University Press, 1991. ISBN 0-8018-4218-2.
