= Maurice (Shelley) =

Book by Mary Shelley

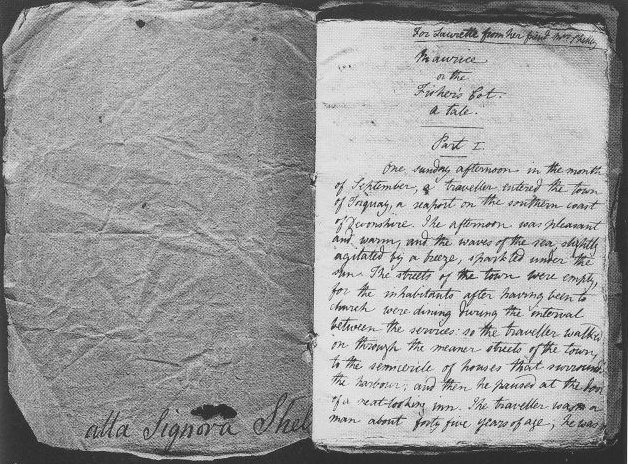
First page of the "Maurice" manuscript, with "alla Signora Shelley" at the bottom left and "For Laurette from her friend Mrs Shelley" at the top right

"Maurice, or the Fisher's Cot" is a children's story by the Romantic writer Mary Shelley. Written in 1820 for Laurette Tighe, a daughter of her friends Margaret King and George William Tighe, Mary Shelley tried to have it published by her father, William Godwin, but he refused. The text was lost until 1997, when a manuscript copy was discovered in Italy.

"Maurice" tells the story of a boy searching for a home and his encounters with a traveller who turns out to be his long-lost father. The story is narrated in a melancholy tone from several points of view and focuses on the theme of loss, particularly the separation of parents and children. Shelley explored this partly autobiographical theme in other works written at the same time, including her novel Mathilda and her play Proserpine. The story's straightforward language reflects that of the Romantic poet William Wordsworth, whose works Shelley was reading while she composed "Maurice".

== Background ==
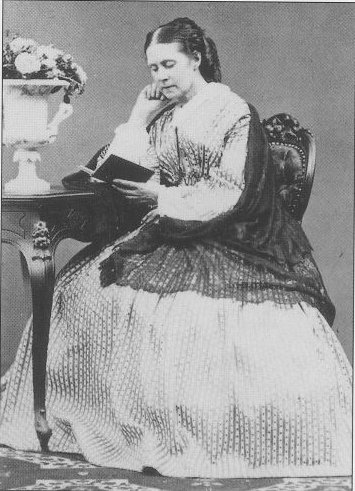
Laurette twenty years after Mary Shelley wrote "Maurice" for her.

In 1814, the seventeen-year-old Mary Shelley (Mary Godwin, at the time) ran off with Percy Bysshe Shelley to continental Europe, accompanied by Claire Clairmont, Mary's stepsister. After six weeks of travelling, they returned to England but continued to live together. Mary returned pregnant with Percy's child, but their infant daughter died soon after her premature birth. Percy was alienated from his family and received little financial support from them; he was therefore harassed by creditors. In 1816, Mary and Percy had a second child, William. The group spent the summer of 1816 with Lord Byron at Lake Geneva, where Mary Shelley wrote Frankenstein. That fall, Percy's wife, Harriet, committed suicide, and in December Percy and Mary were married. Clairmont had been having an affair with the poet Byron, and in January 1817 she had a daughter by him, Allegra. In September 1817, Mary and Percy had another child, Clara.

The group traveled to Italy in early 1818. They first surrendered Allegra to Byron in April, much to Claire's distress. In August, Percy Shelley took Claire to see Allegra, at her request. Percy arrived in Venice, telling Byron he had the entire family. Mary was thus summoned to Venice to substantiate Percy's story. However, baby Clara Shelley was sick and traveling made her even more ill. She died shortly after arriving in Venice. In the winter of 1818, Percy registered a child in Naples to himself and Mary: Elena Adelaide. However, it is unclear who this child's parents really were.

In 1819, the group moved to Rome, where Mary and Percy Shelley's son William died. Mary Shelley had now lost all three of her children and was very depressed. Claire became increasingly concerned about Allegra, as Byron refused to allow her to see their daughter or reveal where she was. Mary, however, became pregnant again, with Percy Florence, and the group traveled from Rome to Pisa and Florence. En route, they became friends with a couple who helped and inspired them: Lady Mountcashell, who as Margaret King had been an eager pupil of Mary Shelley's mother, Mary Wollstonecraft; and George William Tighe, the agricultural theorist for whom she had left her husband and children. Both were poets and, like the Shelleys, were republicans and freethinkers. Lady Mountcashell referred to herself as "Mrs. Mason" after a character from Wollstonecraft's own children's story Original Stories from Real Life (1788). The couple had two children, Anna Laura Georgiana (called Laurette) and Nerina, who quickly became attached to Mary and Claire.

After traveling to Florence, Mary Shelley wrote to Lady Mountcashell, praising Laurette's "simplicity and frankness". By way of her mother, Laurette inquired after Mary's health and requested her presence. Mary Shelley invited Laurette to stay with her in Florence two months after the birth of Percy Florence, but the girl's mother could not bear to part with her. In early 1820, the group moved to Pisa and Claire became like an elder sister to Laurette, taking her to operas and the Carnival. In the summer, the group moved again, from Pisa to Livorno, and Mary Shelley began researching her historical novel Valperga. Throughout the summer, Claire wrote anxiously to Byron, begging to see Allegra. Believing that the Shelleys were careless parents who were responsible for the deaths of their children and concerned that the children were not receiving proper religious training, he consistently refused to let Claire see their daughter.

== Writing and publication ==
Mary Shelley painted by Richard Rothwell (1839–40)

Mary Shelley wrote "Maurice" for Laurette Tighe on 10 August 1820. Shelley's journal for that day notes: "Thursday 10—Write a story for Laurette—Walk on the mountain—Le Buche delle Fate [fairy grottoes or caves]—The weather is warm & delightful". Claire Clairmont and Laurette had spent Laurette's birthday together in Pisa and the following day on the coast with Mary Shelley; this excursion may have inspired the story, which may have been a birthday present. Shelley suggested that her father, philosopher William Godwin, publish Maurice as part of his Juvenile Library, but he refused. He may have thought it was too short or that it too closely resembled a story by Caroline Barnard entitled The Fisher-boy of Weymouth that he had just published in 1819. In his article on "Maurice", L. Adam Mekler suggests that Godwin may also have rejected the story because of the "strong biographical parallels" with the history of the Shelleys and the Godwins.

The manuscript was lost until Cristina Dazzi discovered it in the summer of 1997 in the home of the Dazzi family, Casa Cini, in San Marcello Pistoiese. She was looking through a box of old papers, searching for "something interesting" to add to an exhibit about the winter of 1827–28 when the poet Giacomo Leopardi had visited and met Lady Mountcashell and her daughter. Excerpts were first published in an Italian book about Lady Mountcashell by Mario Curreli in 1997. One year later, Percy Shelley and Mary Wollstonecraft biographer Claire Tomalin published the entire story, along with a lengthy introduction and a typescript of the manuscript.

== Plot summary ==
In "Part I", a traveller arrives in Torquay, Devonshire. He sees a funeral procession passing by and notices a beautiful, distressed young boy taking part. The traveller goes to a local inn, where a countryman tells the story of Maurice and the late-dead Old Barnet. Old Barnet was a fisherman married to Dame Barnet. She had died a little over a year ago and Old Barnet was distraught; he had no wife to come home to. One day, Maurice showed up and volunteered to help him out around the house while he was out fishing. Poor and sickly, Maurice could not perform difficult tasks, but he was diligent. Old Barnet grew to love Maurice, as did the villagers.

"Part II" opens with Old Barnet's brother informing Maurice that he must leave the cottage after one week. Maurice spends his days mourning the fisherman. One day the traveller returns to the village and seeks out Maurice; he stops at the cottage and asks to stay the night. He and Maurice talk and Maurice tells of his plans to leave the cottage and find work on a farm. He also tells the traveller of his poor family and how he does not want to be a bother to them, revealing that his father used to beat him because he did not believe Maurice was really ill. The traveller and Maurice sit together, enjoying nature, and discuss the pleasures of country life and reading. The traveller offers to care for Maurice and to educate him.

The traveller explains in "Part III" how he is the son of an Oxford mathematics professor. When young, he loved to read outdoors and wanted to know how the world worked. He became an architect and travelled throughout Europe. Eventually he married a lovely woman with whom he had a son, Henry. One day the couple left their son with his nurse during an outing and she fell asleep. When they returned, their son was gone, and he could not be found. The traveller spent years searching the countryside for his son; one day he met the woman, Dame Smithson, who had stolen his son. To please her sailor husband who wanted a child, she lied to him and said she was pregnant. Before his return, she needed a child, so she stole the traveller's. Unused to the harsh life of a peasant, the child suffered and became sickly. As a result, the woman's husband disliked him and beat him, believing him to be worthless. Hearing this story, Maurice reveals himself to be the traveller's son; he had changed his name to avoid the person he believed to be his cruel father. Overjoyed to be reunited with his son, the traveller buys the cottage for him and they return every once in a while. Maurice is educated, grows up, and travels widely. He returns to see that the cottage has disintegrated; he builds a new one for another poor fisherman's family, beside the lot of the old one.

== Style, genre, and themes ==
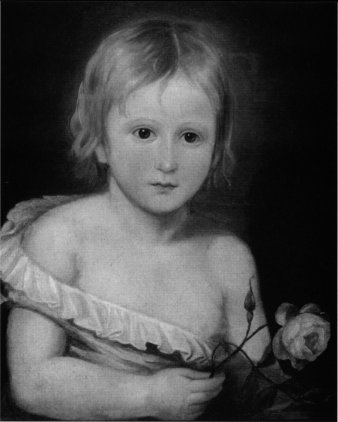
William "Willmouse" Shelley, painted just before his death from malaria (Amelia Curran, 1819)

Maurice is divided into three parts, perhaps reflecting the trend for triple-decker novels for adults at the time, and contains multiple narrators. It is written in a melancholy tone, beginning with a funeral and finishing with the decay of the cottage. However, in her review of the Tomalin edition in The New York Times, Marina Warner writes that the story "contains little of the seething originality, moral complexity or sinister Gothic speculativeness of Frankenstein".

Mary Shelley was reading the poetry of William Wordsworth while she wrote Maurice. Tomalin has argued that "Wordsworth does seem to preside over Maurice, with its clear, straightforward language, and its setting among simple people and poor labourers, and against elemental backgrounds of rocks and trees, cliffs and seashore".

Maurice's natural goodness never wavers in the story. Unlike Shelley's Frankenstein, which suggests that environment determines a person's morality, Maurice assumes that people can be innately good. Maurice even forgives Dame Smithson, who stole him from his nurse. The story aims to generate sympathy in its readers. In contrast with other children's stories of its day, it lacks didacticism and draws no clear distinctions between virtue and vice.

Despite the appeal to sympathy, loss is the predominant theme of Maurice: parents lose their child; a mother yearns for a child to the point that she steals one; and "Maurice" loses his sense of identity. The overarching themes of the story are Romantic, according to Tomalin: "the vulnerability of childhood, and of parenthood; displacement, loss, pain, death and rehabilitation; delight in the natural world; and the power of time both to heal and to destroy".

The loss of children, in particular, may have had autobiographical and biographical resonances. Lady Mountcashell had separated from her husband and been forced to give up her children. A court had ruled Percy Bysshe Shelley unfit to raise the children from his marriage to his deceased first wife and placed them in the care of a court-appointed guardian. A third reference may be to the death of three of Mary and Percy's children. Literary critic A. A. Markley points out that Shelley wrote other works at this time that engaged with the issue of child-parent separation, most notably her novel Mathilda and the children's drama Proserpine, both of which she worked on in 1820. Markley explains that Maurice is a reworking of Mathilda, "in which a long deferred reunion of father and child is orchestrated with happy rather than tragic results". This theme is also explored in Mary Shelley's short stories "The Mourner", "The Evil Eye", and "The Pilgrims", as well as her novel Lodore (1835).

Mekler argues that the story may be a veiled criticism of Mary Shelley's stepmother, Mary Jane Clairmont. Dame Smithson lies to her husband regarding her children, a possible allusion to the origins of Mary Jane Clairmont's own first two children and to her "propensity for falsehood". (Clairmont represented herself as a widow, with legitimate children, which was not the case.) Mekler speculates that "in her theft of the first-born son, Dame Smithson replicates in metaphorical fashion Mary Jane's usurpation of the role as mother of the male heir that had originally belonged to Mary Wollstonecraft".

== Reception ==
According to Miranda Seymour, author of a biography of Mary Shelley, while the story itself was "no great work...the public responded to the discovery with an interest not shown, for example, towards recently found letters of [Percy] Shelley and Byron". She explained this occurred because Mary Shelley is now considered a significant Romantic writer, her works have become increasingly accessible to the public, and her authorship of Frankenstein is often mentioned in the popular press.

== See also ==
- Mary Shelley bibliography

== Bibliography ==
- Crook, Nora. "Mary Shelley in Her Times & Maurice, or the Fisher's Cot: A Tale". Wordsworth Circle 32 (2001).
- Dazzi, Cristina. "Preface". Maurice, or the Fisher's Cot. Ed and intro. Claire Tomalin. New York: Viking, 1998. ISBN 0-670-88172-4.
- Markley, A. A. "Lost and Found: Mary Shelley, Maurice, or the Fisher's Cot: A Tale. Edited with an Introduction by Claire Tomalin". Romanticism on the Net 15 (August 1999). Retrieved 20 May 2008.
- Mekler, L. Adam. "Placing Maurice within the Shelley-Godwin Circle". CEAMagazine 14 (2001): 23–33.
- Seymour, Miranda. Mary Shelley. New York: Grove Press, 2000. ISBN 0-8021-3948-5.
- Shelley, Mary. Maurice, or the Fisher's Cot. Ed and intro. Claire Tomalin. New York: Viking, 1998. ISBN 0-670-88172-4.
- Warner, Marina. "Happily Ever After?". New York Times (29 November 1998), Sec. 7:8. Lexis-Nexis. Retrieved 22 May 2008.
