= Falkner (novel) =

1837 book by Mary Shelley

Falkner (1837) is the penultimate book published by the author Mary Shelley. Like Shelley's earlier novel Lodore (1835), it charts a young woman's education under a tyrannical father figure.

== Plot ==
As a six-year-old orphan, Elizabeth Raby prevents Rupert Falkner from committing suicide; Falkner then adopts her and brings her up to be a model of virtue. However, she falls in love with Gerald Neville, whose mother Falkner had unintentionally driven to her death years before. After the death of Gerald Neville's mother, another man in love with her is killed by Falkner, this man is Gerald's father. When Falkner is finally acquitted of murdering Neville's father, Elizabeth's female values subdue the destructive impulses of the two men she loves, who are reconciled and unite with Elizabeth in domestic harmony.

== Reception ==
Falkner is the only one of Shelley's novels in which the heroine's agenda triumphs. In critic Kate Ferguson Ellis's view, the novel's resolution proposes that when female values triumph over violent and destructive masculinity, men will be freed to express the "compassion, sympathy, and generosity" of their better natures.

Critics have until recently cited Lodore and Falkner as evidence of a conservative retrenchment by Shelley. In 1984, Mary Poovey identified the retreat of Shelley's reformist politics into the "separate sphere" of the domestic. As with Lodore, contemporary critics reviewed the novel as a romance, overlooking its political subtext and noting its moral issues as purely familial. Betty Bennett argues, however, that Falkner is as much concerned with power and political responsibility as Shelley's previous novels. Poovey suggested that Shelley wrote Falkner to resolve her conflicted response to her father's combination of libertarian radicalism and stern insistence on social decorum.

Critics view Falkner neither as notably feminist, nor as one of Mary Shelley's strongest novels, though she herself believed it could be her best. The novel has been criticised for its two-dimensional characterisation. In Bennett's view, "Lodore and Falkner represent fusions of the psychological social novel with the educational novel, resulting not in romances but instead in narratives of destabilization: the heroic protagonists are educated women who strive to create a world of justice and universal love".

== Bibliography ==
- Allen, Graham. "Public and Private Fidelity: Mary Shelley's 'Life of William Godwin' and Falkner". Mary Shelley's Fictions: From Frankenstein to Falkner. Eds. Michael Eberle-Sinatra and Nora Crook. New York, NY: Macmillan; St. Martin's, 2000.
- Bennett, Betty T. Mary Wollstonecraft Shelley: An Introduction. Baltimore: Johns Hopkins University Press, 1998. ISBN 0-8018-5976-X.
- Bennett, Betty T. "'Not This Time, Victor': Mary Shelley's Reversioning of Elizabeth, from Frankenstein to Falkner". Mary Shelley in Her Times. Eds Betty T. Bennett, Betty T. and Stuart Curran. Baltimore: Johns Hopkins University Press, 2000.
- Bunnell, Charlene E. "The Illusion of 'Great Expectations': Manners and Morals in Mary Shelley's Lodore and Falkner". Iconoclastic Departures: Mary Shelley after "Frankenstein": Essays in Honor of the Bicentenary of Mary Shelley's Birth. Eds. Syndy M. Conger, Frederick S. Frank, and Gregory O'Dea. Madison, NJ: Fairleigh Dickinson University Press, 1997.
- Ellis, Kate Ferguson. "Falkner and other fictions". The Cambridge Companion to Mary Shelley. Ed. Esther Schor. Cambridge: Cambridge University Press, 2003. ISBN 0-521-00770-4.
- Hopkins, Lisa. "'A Medea, in More Senses than the More Obvious One': Motherhood in Mary Shelley's Lodore and Falkner". Eighteenth-Century Novel 2 (2002): 383–405.
- Jowell, Sharon L. "Mary Shelley's Mothers: The Weak, the Absent, and the Silent in Lodore and Falkner". European Romantic Review 8.3 (1997): 298–322.
- Poovey, Mary. The Proper Lady and the Woman Writer: Ideology as Style in the Works of Mary Wollstonecraft, Mary Shelley and Jane Austen. Chicago: University of Chicago Press, 1985. ISBN 0-226-67528-9.
- Saunders, Julia. "Rehabilitating the Family in Mary Shelley's Falkner". Mary Shelley's Fictions: From Frankenstein to Falkner. Eds. Michael Eberle-Sinatra and Nora Crook. New York, NY: Macmillan; St. Martin's, 2000.
- Sites, Melissa. "Utopian Domesticity as Social Reform in Mary Shelley's Falkner". Keats-Shelley Journal 54 (2005): 148–72.
