= Mathilda (novella) =

1959 novella by Mary Shelley

- Editor: Elizabeth Nitchie
- Author: Mary Shelley
- Language: English
- Genre: Novella, Gothic
- Publisher: University of North Carolina Press
- Publication date: 1959
- Publication place: United States
- Media type: Print
- Pages: 104 pages
- OCLC: 2494341

Mathilda, or Matilda, is a novella by Mary Shelley, written between August 1819 and February 1820 and first published posthumously in 1959. It deals with common Gothic themes of incest and suicide.

The narrative deals with a father's incestuous love for his daughter. It has been perceived as an autobiographical novel and as a roman à clef, where the fictitious names in the novel represent real people. In this reading, Mathilda represents Mary Shelley herself, Mathilda's father represents William Godwin (Mary's father), and the poet Woodville represents Percy Shelley (Mary's husband). However, the storyline itself may not be based on facts. It has been argued that it is using the techniques of confessional and unreliable narrations, which Godwin had used in his own works.

== Background ==
The act of writing this novella distracted Mary Shelley from her grief after the deaths of her one-year-old daughter Clara at Venice in September 1818 and her three-year-old son William in June 1819 in Rome. These losses plunged Mary Shelley into a depression that distanced her from Percy Shelley and left her, as he put it, "on the hearth of pale despair".

== Plot ==
Narrating from her deathbed, Mathilda, a young woman barely in her twenties, writes her story as a way of explaining her actions to her friend, Woodville. Her narration follows her lonely upbringing and climaxes at a point when her unnamed father confesses his incestuous love for her. This is then followed by his suicide by drowning and her ultimate demise; her relationship with the gifted young poet, Woodville, fails to reverse Matilda's emotional withdrawal or prevent her lonely death.

The novella begins with readers becoming aware that this story is being narrated in the first person, by Mathilda, and that this narration is meant for a specific audience in answer to a question asked prior to the novella's beginning: "You have often asked me the cause of my solitary life; my tears; and above all of my impenetrable and unkind silence." Readers quickly learn that Mathilda is on her deathbed and this is the only reason she is exposing what seems to be a dark secret.

Mathilda's narrative first explores the relationship between her mother and father, and how they knew each other growing up. Mathilda's mother, Diana, and her father were childhood friends; Mathilda's father found solace in Diana after the death of his own mother and the two married not long after. Mathilda, as narrator, notes that Diana changed Mathilda's father making him more tender and less fickle. However, Mathilda was born a little more than a year after their marriage and Diana died a few days after her birth, causing her father to sink into a deep depression. His sister, Mathilda's aunt, came to England to stay with them and help care for Mathilda, but Mathilda's father, unable to even look at his daughter, left about a month after his wife's death and Mathilda was raised by her aunt.

Mathilda tells Woodville that her upbringing, while cold on the part of her aunt, was never neglectful; she learned to occupy her time with books and jaunts around her aunt's estate in Loch Lomond, Scotland. On Mathilda's sixteenth birthday her aunt received a letter from Mathilda's father expressing his desire to see his daughter. Mathilda describes their first three months in each other's company as being blissful, but this ended first when Mathilda's aunt dies and then, after the two return to London, upon Mathilda's father's expression of his love for her.

Leading up to the moment of revelation, Mathilda was courted by suitors which, she noticed, drew dark moods from her father. This darkness ensued causing Mathilda to plot a way of bringing back the father she once knew. She asked him to accompany her on a walk through the woods that surrounded them and, on this walk, she expressed her concerns and her wishes to restore their relationship. Her father accused her of being "presumptuous and very rash." However, this did not stop her and he eventually confessed his incestuous desire regarding her. Mathilda's father fainted and she retreated back to their home. Her father left her a note the next morning explaining that he would leave her and she understood that his actual intent was to commit suicide. Mathilda followed him, but was too late to stop him from drowning himself.

For some time after his death, Mathilda returned to society as she became sick in her attempts to stop her father. She realized, though, that she could not remain in this society and she faked her own death to ensure that no one would come looking for her. Mathilda re-established herself in a solitary house in the heath. She had a maid who came to care for the house every few days, but other than that she had no human interaction until Woodville also established residence in the heath about two years after she chose to reside there.

Woodville was mourning the loss of his betrothed, Elinor, and a poet. He and Mathilda struck a friendship; Woodville often asked Mathilda why she never smiled but she would not go into much detail regarding this. One day, Mathilda suggested to Woodville that they end their mutual sorrows together and commit suicide. Woodville talked Mathilda out of this decision, but soon after had to leave the heath to care for his ailing mother. Mathilda contemplates her future after his departure, and while walking through the heath, gets lost and ends up sleeping outside for a night. It rains while she sleeps outside and, after she makes her way back to her home, she becomes extremely sick.

It is in this state that Mathilda decides to write out her story to Woodville as a way of explaining to him her darker countenance, even though she recognizes that she does not have much longer to live.

== Criticism ==
Commentators have often read the text as autobiographical, with the three central characters standing for Mary Shelley, William Godwin (her father), and Percy Shelley (her husband). There is no firm evidence, however, that the storyline itself is autobiographical. Analysis of Mathilda's first draft, titled "The Fields of Fancy", reveals that Mary Shelley took as her starting point Mary Wollstonecraft's unfinished "The Cave of Fancy", in which a small girl's mother dies in a shipwreck. Like Mary Shelley herself, Mathilda idealises her lost mother. According to editor Janet Todd, the absence of the mother from the last pages of the novella suggests that Mathilda's death renders her one with her mother, enabling a union with the dead father. Critic Pamela Clemit resists a purely autobiographical reading and argues that Mathilda is an artfully crafted novella, deploying confessional and unreliable narrations in the style of her father, as well as the device of the pursuit used by Godwin in his Caleb Williams and by Mary Shelley in Frankenstein. The novella's 1959 editor, Elizabeth Nitchie, noted its faults of "verbosity, loose plotting, somewhat stereotyped and extravagant characterization" but praised a "feeling for character and situation and phrasing that is often vigorous and precise".

The story may be seen as a metaphor for what happens when a woman, ignorant of all consequences, follows her own heart while dependent on her male benefactor.

Mathilda has also been seen as an example of redefining female Gothic narratives. An important characteristic of this redefined genre often includes female narrators having more control over the story than was common at the time. According to Kathleen A. Miller, "Although Shelley's novella appears to relate a conventional female gothic narrative of a young woman victimized by her father's incestuous desire, it leaves open the possibility that, in fact, it is Mathilda, rather than her father, who wields control over the novel's gothic script." This potentially allows for Mathilda to be viewed as a positive role model in nineteenth-century literature as she overcomes paternal authority and refuses to conform to commonly accepted practices regarding female characters in literature of the time. This redefinition occurs in various ways: Mathilda's refusal to name her father, her voice being the primary source of information provided to readers, and a lack of the novella ending in marriage which was the typical motif for female gothic literature.

== Publication ==
Mary Shelley sent the finished Mathilda to her father in England, to submit for publication. However, though Godwin admired aspects of the novella, he found the incest theme "disgusting and detestable" and failed to return the manuscript despite his daughter's repeated requests. In the light of Percy Shelley's later death by drowning, Mary Shelley came to regard the novella as ominous; she wrote of herself and Jane Williams "driving (like Mathilda) towards the sea to learn if we were to be for ever doomed to misery". The novella was published for the first time in 1959, edited by Elizabeth Nitchie from dispersed papers. It has become possibly Mary Shelley's best-known work after Frankenstein.

== Translations ==
- Mary Shelley, Mathilda, traduzione di Alessio Severo, Passerino Editore, 2025, ASIN B0F8TLNMZR

== Bibliography ==
- Allen, Graham. "Beyond Biographism: Mary Shelley's Matilda, Intertextuality, and the Wandering Subject". Romanticism 3.2 (1997): 170–84.
- Bennett, Betty T., ed. Mary Shelley in her Times. Baltimore: Johns Hopkins University Press, 2003. ISBN 0-8018-7733-4.
- Bennett, Betty T. "Mary Shelley's letters: the public/private self." The Cambridge Companion to Mary Shelley. Ed. Esther Schor. Cambridge: Cambridge University Press, 2003. ISBN 0-521-00770-4.
- Bennett, Betty T. Mary Wollstonecraft Shelley: An Introduction. Baltimore: Johns Hopkins University Press, 1998. ISBN 0-8018-5976-X.
- Bunnell, Charlene. "Mathilda: Mary Shelley's Romantic Tragedy". Keats-Shelley Journal 46 (1997): 75–96.
- Chatterjee, Ranita. "Filial Ties: Godwin's Deloraine and Mary Shelley's Writings". European Romantic Review 18.1 (2007): 29–41. Taylor & Frances Online
- Chatterjee, Ranita. "Mathilda: Mary Shelley, William Godwin, and the Ideologies of Incest". Iconoclastic Departures: Mary Shelley after "Frankenstein": Essays in Honor of the Bicentenary of Mary Shelley's Birth. Eds. Syndy M. Conger, Frederick S. Frank, and Gregory O'Dea. Madison, NJ: Fairleigh Dickinson University Press, 1997.
- Clemit, Pamela. "Frankenstein, Matilda, and the legacies of Godwin and Wollstonecraft." The Cambridge Companion to Mary Shelley. Ed. Esther Schor. Cambridge: Cambridge University Press, 2003. ISBN 0-521-00770-4.
- Clemit, Pamela. "From The Fields of Fancy to Matilda." Mary Shelley in her Times. Ed. Betty T. Bennett. Baltimore: Johns Hopkins University Press, 2003. ISBN 0-8018-7733-4.
- Davis, William. "Mathilda and the Ruin of Masculinity". European Romantic Review 13.2 (2002): 175–181
- Edelman-Young, Diana. "'Kingdom of Shadows': Intimations of Desire in Mary Shelley's Mathilda". Keats-Shelley Journal 51 (2002): 116–144.
- Ford, Susan Allen. "'A Name More Dear': Daughters, Fathers, and Desire in A Simple Story, The False Friend, and Mathilda". Re-Visioning Romanticism: British Women Writers, 1776–1837. Eds. Carol Shiner Wilson and Joel Haefner. Philadelphia: University of Pennsylvania Press, 1994.
- François, Anne-Lise and Daniel Mozes. "'Don't Say 'I Love You': Agency, Gender and Romanticism in Mary Shelley's Matilda". Mary Shelley's Fictions: From Frankenstein to Falkner. Ed. Michael Eberle-Sinatra and Nora Crook. New York: Macmillan; St. Martin's, 2000.
- Garrett, Margaret Davenport. "Writing and Re-Writing Incest in Mary Shelley's Mathilda". Keats-Shelley Journal 45 (1996): 44–60.
- Gillingham, Lauren. "Romancing Experience: The Seduction of Mary Shelley's Matilda". Studies in Romanticism 42.2 (2003): 251–269.
- Harpold, Terence. "'Did You Get Mathilda from Papa?': Seduction Fantasy and the Circulation of Mary Shelley's Mathilda". Studies in Romanticism 29(1989): 49–67.
- Himes, Audra Dibert. "'Knew Shame, and Knew Desire': Ambivalence as Structure in Mary Shelley's Mathilda". Iconoclastic Departures: Mary Shelley after "Frankenstein": Essays in Honor of the Bicentenary of Mary Shelley's Birth. Eds. Syndy M. Conger, Frederick S. Frank, and Gregory O'Dea. Madison, NJ: Fairleigh Dickinson University Press, 1997.
- Knoepflmacher, U. C. "Thoughts on the Aggression of Daughters". The Endurance of "Frankenstein": Essays on Mary Shelley's Novel. Eds. U. C. Knoepflmacher and George Levine. Berkeley: University of California Press, 1979.
- Mellor, Anne K. Mary Shelley: Her Life, her Fiction, Her Monsters. London: Routledge, 1990. ISBN 0-415-90147-2.
- Rajan, Tilottama. "Mary Shelley's Mathilda: Melancholy and the Political Economy of Romanticism". Studies in the Novel 26.2 (1994): 43–68.
- Ready, Robert. "Dominion of Demeter: Mary Shelley's Mathilda". Keats-Shelley Journal 52 (2003): 94–110.
- Shelley, Mary. The Journals of Mary Shelley, 1814–44. Ed. Paula R. Feldman and Diana Scott-Kilvert. Baltimore: Johns Hopkins University Press, 1995. ISBN 0-8018-5088-6.
- Shelley, Mary. The Letters of Mary Wollstonecraft Shelley. Ed. Betty T. Bennett. 3 vols. Baltimore: Johns Hopkins University Press, 1980–83.
- Shelley, Mary. Mathilda. Ed. Elizabeth Nitchie. Chapel Hill: University of North Carolina Press, 1959. OCLC 249434. Gutenberg copy, retrieved 16 February 2008.
- Shelley, Mary. Matilda; with Mary and Maria, by Mary Wollstonecraft. Ed. Janet Todd. London: Penguin, 1992. ISBN 0-14-043371-6.
- Shelley, Mary. Selected Letters of Mary Wollstonecraft Shelley. Ed. Betty T. Bennett. Baltimore: Johns Hopkins University Press, 1995. ISBN 0-8018-4886-5.
