= Sunstein =

Sunstein is a surname. Notable people with the surname include:

- Cass Sunstein (born 1954), American legal scholar
- Emily W. Sunstein (1924–2007), American campaigner, political activist and biographer
