= Lodore =

1835 novel by Mary Shelley

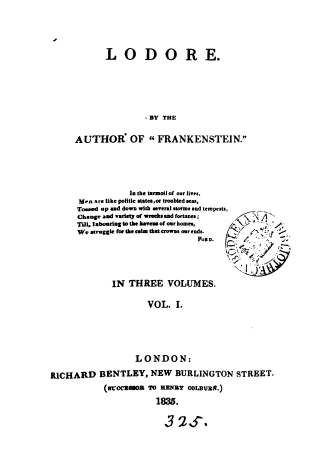
Title page from Lodore (1835)

Lodore, also published under the title The Beautiful Widow, is a novel by Romantic novelist Mary Shelley, completed in 1833 and published in 1835.

== Plot and themes ==
In Lodore, Shelley focused her theme of power and responsibility on the microcosm of the family. The central story follows the fortunes of the wife and daughter of the title character, Lord Lodore, who is killed in a duel at the end of the first volume, leaving a trail of legal, financial, and familial obstacles for the two "heroines" to negotiate. Mary Shelley places female characters at the centre of the ensuing narratives: Lodore's daughter, Ethel, raised to be over-dependent on paternal control; his estranged wife, Cornelia, preoccupied with the norms and appearances of aristocratic society; and the intellectual and independent Fanny Derham, with whom both are contrasted.

The novel's modern editor, Lisa Vargo, has noted the text's engagement with political and ideological issues, particularly the education and social role of women. She suggests that Lodore dissects a patriarchal culture that separated the sexes and pressured women into dependence on men. In the view of critic Betty T. Bennett, "the novel proposes egalitarian educational paradigms for women and men, which would bring social justice as well as the spiritual and intellectual means by which to meet the challenges life invariably brings".

== Reception ==
Lodore was a success with the reviewers: Fraser's Magazine praised its "depth and sweep of thought", for example; and it prompted The Literary Gazette to call Mary Shelley "one of the most original of our modern writers". Later nineteenth-century critics were more dubious: in 1886, Edward Dowden called Lodore "biography transmuted for the purposes of fiction"; in 1889, Florence Marshall remarked that Lodore was "written in a style that is now out of date". It was believed for instance that Ethel's encounter with Clorinda Saville was based upon Emilia Viviani.

== Bibliography ==
- Bennett, Betty T. Mary Wollstonecraft Shelley: An Introduction. Baltimore: Johns Hopkins University Press, 1998. ISBN 0-8018-5976-X.
- Bunnell, Charlene E. "All the World's a Stage": Dramatic Sensibility in Mary Shelley's Novels. New York: Routledge, 2002. ISBN 0-415-93863-5.
- Bunnell, Charlene E. "The Illusion of 'Great Expectations': Manners and Morals in Mary Shelley's Lodore and Falkner". Iconoclastic Departures: Mary Shelley after "Frankenstein": Essays in Honor of the Bicentenary of Mary Shelley's Birth. Eds. Syndy M. Conger, Frederick S. Frank, and Gregory O'Dea. Madison, NJ: Fairleigh Dickinson University Press, 1997.
- Cronin, Richard. "Mary Shelley and Edward Bulwer: Lodore as Hybrid Fiction". Mary versus Mary. Eds. Lilla Maria Crisafulli and Giovanna Silvani. Naples: Liguori, 2001.
- Gonda, Caroline. "Lodore and Fanny Derham's Story". Women's Writing 6.3 (1999): 329–44.
- Hopkins, Lisa. "'A Medea, in More Senses than the More Obvious One': Motherhood in Mary Shelley's Lodore and Falkner". Eighteenth-Century Novel 2 (2002): 383–405.
- Joffe, Sharon Lynne. The Kinship Coterie and the Literary Endeavors of the Women in the Shelley Circle. New York: Peter Lang, 2007.
- Jowell, Sharon. "Mary Shelley's Mothers: The Weak, the Absent, and the Silent in Lodore and Falkner". European Romantic Review 8.3 (1997): 298–322.
- Kilroy, James F. The Nineteenth Century English Novel: Family Ideology and Narrative Form. New York: Palgrave Macmillan, 2007.
- Shelley, Mary. Lodore. Ed. Lisa Vargo. Ontario: Broadview Press, 1997. ISBN 1-55111-077-6.
- Sites, Melissa. "Re/membering Home: Utopian Domesticity in Mary Shelley's Lodore". A Brighter Morn: The Shelley Circle's Utopian Project. Ed. Darby Lewes. Lanham, MD: Lexington Books, 2003. ISBN 0-7391-0472-1.
- Stafford, Fiona. "Lodore: A Tale of the Present Time?". Mary Shelley's Fiction: From Frankenstein to Falkner. Eds. Michael Eberle-Sinatra and Nora Crook. New York: Macmillan; St. Martin's, 2000.
- Vallins, David. "Mary Shelley and the Lake Poets: Negotiation and Transcendence in Lodore". Mary Shelley's Fiction: From Frankenstein to Falkner. Eds. Michael Eberle-Sinatra and Nora Crook. New York: Macmillan; St. Martin's, 2000.
- Vargo, Lisa. "Further Thoughts on the Education of Daughters: Lodore as an Imagined Conversation with Mary Wollstonecraft". Mary Wollstonecraft and Mary Shelley: Writing Lives. Eds. Helen M. Buss, D. L. Macdonald, and Anne McWhir. Waterloo, ON: Wilfrid Laurier University Press, 2001.
- Vargo, Lisa. "Lodore and the 'Novel of Society'". Women's Writing 6.3 (1999): 425–40.
- Vargo, Lisa. "The Aikins and the Godwins: Notions of Conflict and Stoicism in Anna Barbauld and Mary Shelley". Romanticism 11.1 (2005): 84–98.
- White, Newman Ivey (1972). Shelley. Vol. 2. New York City, NY: Octagon Press, Limited. ISBN 978-0-374-98426-7.
- Williams, Nicholas. "Angelic Realism: Domestic Idealization in Mary Shelley's Lodore". Studies in the Novel 39.4 (2007): 397–415.
