= Shelley's Cottage =

- Location within Surrey
- 51°25′59″N 0°35′36″W
- Type: Cottage
- Location: Englefield Green
- OS grid reference: SU9789171395

History
- Built: c. 1800

Site notes
- Area: Surrey

Listed Building – Grade II
- Official name: Shelley's Cottage
- Designated: 17 November 1986
- Reference no.: 1028923

Shelley's Cottage is a Grade II listed early 19th-century large cottage in west Englefield Green, Surrey, England within 100 metres of Windsor Great Park marking the start of Berkshire.

== Physical environment ==
The two-storey cottage dates from c. 1800 and is built from red brick with a low-pitched slate roof. It has been extended with matching materials and in similar styles and today has a small garden relative to the average along the lane. The cottage is in the west of Englefield Green, in a plot screened behind others and tall trees that is, at about 100 metres east, close to Windsor Great Park. It is in the Borough of Runnymede, Surrey which as part of Englefield Green which in the early 19th century formed the uplands of the extensive parish of Egham centred on a small market town 2 miles (3 km) east, today a suburban town. This neighbourhood was widely known by a lesser used name, Bishopsgate, in Shelley's time referring to the east gate of the monarch's own landscape park in southern England.

The cottage is situated at the end of an unnamed road that adjoins Wick Lane. The road is believed to be private, its residents generally unwelcoming of visitors wishing to view the property, even for research purposes.

== The Shelleys' two-year tenure ==
=== Background ===
It is named after Romantic poet Percy Bysshe Shelley, who lived at the cottage with his wife Mary Shelley (née Godwin) from August 1815 to May 1816. The Shelleys were able to rent the Bishopsgate cottage after a revival in Percy's finances due to the death of his grandfather, Sir Bysshe Shelley. After a holiday in Torquay on a sheltered bay in the south-west coast, they came to live at the cottage.

=== Influences and events during this period ===
Little is known about this period in Mary's life, since her journal from May 1815 to July 1816 is lost but here, Percy wrote the poem Alastor; and on 24 January 1816, Mary gave birth to their second child, William, named after her father and soon nicknamed "Willmouse". In her novel The Last Man, she later imagined Windsor as a Garden of Eden.
