= Yours, Creature =

2023 poetry collection by Jessica Cuello

- Author: Jessica Cuello
- Language: English
- Genre: Poetry
- Published: 15 May 2023; 3 years ago
- Publisher: JackLeg Press
- Publication place: USA
- Media type: Print
- Pages: 110 pp
- ISBN: 9781737513438
- Preceded by: Liar, 2021
- Followed by: Feral, 2027

Yours, Creature is a 2023 epistolary poetry collection written by American poet Jessica Cuello, and published with JackLeg Press. Consisting of 48 poems, the collection's subject matter is a number of events in the life of Mary Shelley.

== Publication ==
Poems from the collection were published in such journals as Plume, Mom Egg Review (MER), Birdfeast Magazine, Tinderbox Poetry Journal, Poetry Is Currency, the Account and the Los Angeles Review. A poem titled 'Dear Mother,' also featured on Verse Daily in 2024.

== Themes ==
This 48 poem collection, which has poems spread across 97 pages and in six sections, explores "loneliness and abandonment" has been structured in a way that each of its sections, which is "titled with a line from a poem" with the title serving "as a guidepost" for the said section; it is then "followed by a short time-line explanation" of the birth of Mary Wollstonecraft Shelley (née Godwin), "her affair and marriage" with the poet P. B. Shelley, the death of her three children in infancy, and the writing of Frankenstein, her most famous novel. The poems in the collection further follow personal events such as "the emotional desperation of a child" exploring the loss of her mother, Mary's pregnancy and "distress over her relationship with Shelley" (his affairs, etc.), the death of a child, the creation of the "monster", etc. One of the poems, titled 'Dear London 1814,' focusses on the initial (and lasting) "impact that Percy had on the entire [Godwin] family". Martelli notes that in Yours, Creature, love is shown "in all of its destructive and creative manifestations."

The poet Philip Metres noted that Cuello's fourth full-length collection looks into the very "turbulent" life events of the writer Mary Shelley, best-known for and often surpassed in fame by the popular "creature of her world-famous novel, Frankenstein, through persona poems." Rebecca Morgan Frank, writing for Poetry Foundation, called it an "epistolary poetic biography", with poems written as letters addressed to Mary Shelley's dead mother Mary Wollstonecraft, "to emotional and physical landscapes" and Frankenstein's monster, which is looked at as the titular "creature". The events observed in the collection include "Mary Shelley’s loss of her mother, shortly after her birth, to the drowning of her husband, Percy Shelley."

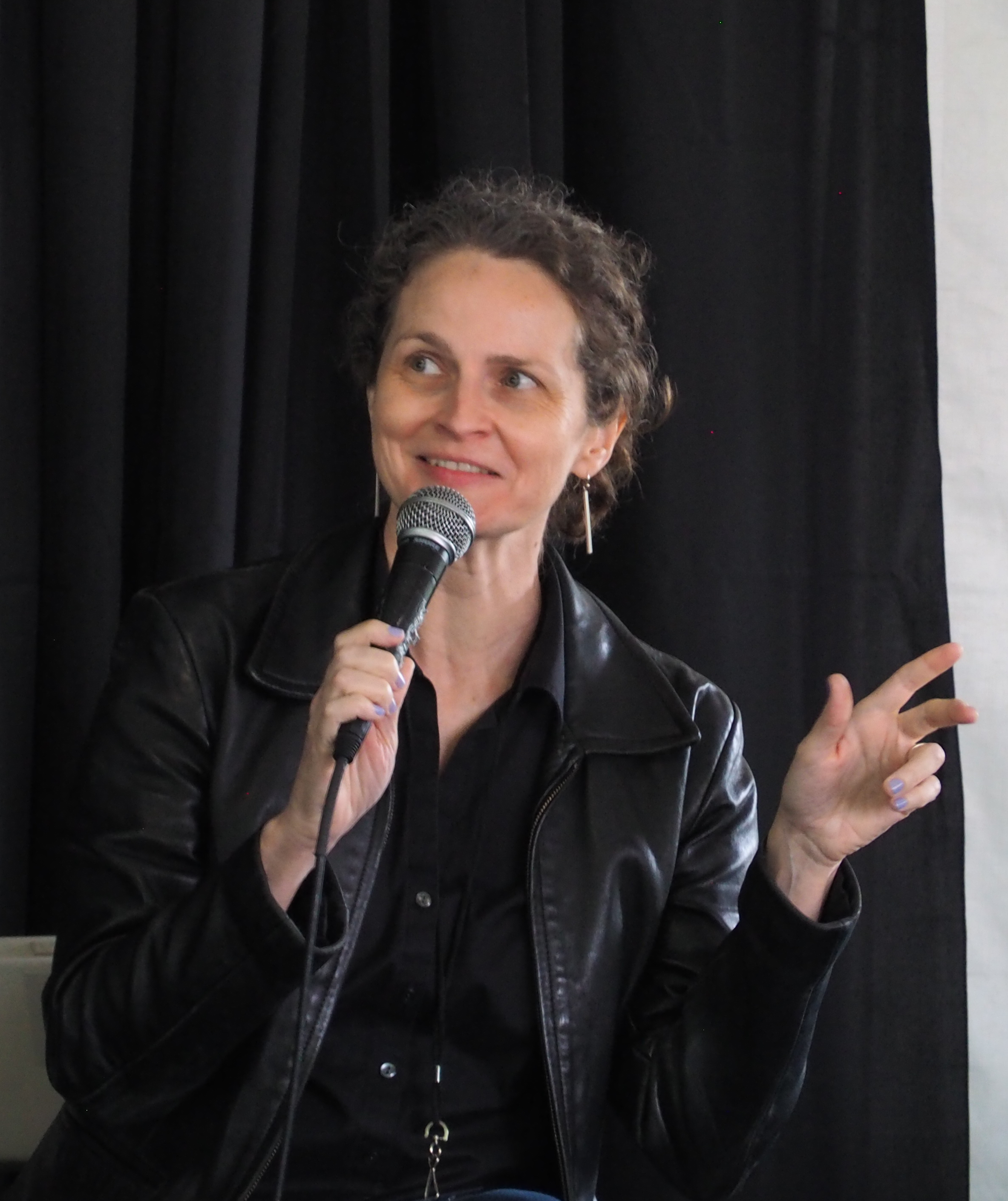
Jessica Cuello reading at Gaithersburg Book Festival in 2024

== Reception ==
MER and Tinderbox also published reviews of Yours, Creature. Jennifer Martelli, writing for MER, praised "Cuello's genius structure [which] allows for storytelling", and Donna Vorreyer, writing for Tinderbox, called it a "luminous collection". More reviews, published on the Poetry Foundation website, in the Ocean State Review, Cultural Daily, and elsewhere, noted it as a collection sharing, through fictional letters, the story of the transfer of Mary's "fixation from her maker to her own successful creation" and how she "fed the needs of her husband's ego and his stomach"; praised Cuello's creation of a "distinctive and credible Regency era voice for Mary Shelley", calling it "a work of exceptional sensitivity and thoughtfulness." In another short review, Matthew Lippman, who shared the book as a recommendation, said of the poems that they are "monstrous and not monstrous in the way that all monsters are mirrors of humanity". Jennifer Schneider calls it a masterful demonstration of "the timeless poetic power of letter writing", praising Cuello's "unmatched" attention to detail. Writing for Tupelo Quarterly, Audrey Cadena calls Yours, Creature "a collection of hauntingly dark poetry written ... in the voice of Mary Shelley." Writing for South Florida Poetry Journal, Kurt Luchs notes that "an era that was truly harrowing for women" is brought to life through Cuello's work in this "extraordinary book of poetry!"

A series of interviews, following the publication of Yours, Creature, also appeared as part of Kith Books' Pressed Into Ink, and in such journals as the Harbor Review, The Rumpus, and elsewhere.
