= Mary Shelley =

English writer (1797–1851)

- Richard Rothwell's portrait of Shelley was shown at the Royal Academy in 1840, accompanied by lines from Percy Shelley's poem The Revolt of Islam calling her a "child of love and light".
- Born: Mary Wollstonecraft Godwin; 30 August 1797; London, England
- Died: 1 February 1851 (aged 53); London, England
- Occupation: Writer
- Spouse: Percy Bysshe Shelley (m. 1816; died 1822)
- Children: 4, including Percy Florence
- Parents: William Godwin; Mary Wollstonecraft
- Relatives: Fanny Imlay (half-sister); William Godwin the Younger (half-brother); Claire Clairmont (stepsister)
- Writing career
- Notable works: Frankenstein (1818), see more...

Mary Wollstonecraft Shelley (née Godwin; 30 August 1797 – 1 February 1851) was an English novelist who wrote the Gothic novel Frankenstein; or, The Modern Prometheus (1818), which is considered an early example of science fiction. She also edited and promoted the works of her husband, the Romantic poet and philosopher Percy Bysshe Shelley. Her father was the political philosopher William Godwin and her mother was the philosopher and women's rights advocate Mary Wollstonecraft.

Mary's mother died 11 days after giving birth to her. She was raised by her father, who provided her with a rich informal education, encouraging her to adhere to his own anarchist political theories. When she was four, her father married a neighbour, Mary Jane Clairmont, with whom Mary had a troubled relationship.

In 1814, Mary began a romance with one of her father's political followers, Percy Bysshe Shelley, who was already married. Together with her stepsister, Claire Clairmont, she and Percy left for France and travelled through Europe. Upon their return to England, Mary was pregnant with Percy's child. Over the next two years, she and Percy faced ostracism, constant debt and the death of their daughter. They married in late 1816, after the suicide of Percy's wife, Harriet.

In 1816, the couple and Mary's stepsister famously spent a summer with Lord Byron and John William Polidori near Geneva, Switzerland, where Mary conceived the idea for her novel Frankenstein. The Shelleys left Britain in 1818 for Italy, where their second and third children died before Mary gave birth to her last and only surviving child, Percy Florence Shelley. In 1822, her husband drowned when his sailing boat sank during a storm near Viareggio. A year later, Mary returned to England and from then on devoted herself to raising her son and to her career as a professional author. The last decade of her life was dogged by illness, most likely caused by the brain tumour which killed her at the age of 53.

Until the 1970s, Mary Shelley was known mainly for her efforts to publish her husband's works and for her novel Frankenstein, which remains widely read and has inspired many theatrical and film adaptations. Recent scholarship has yielded a more comprehensive view of her achievements. Scholars have shown increasing interest in her literary output, particularly in her novels, which include the historical novels Valperga (1823) and Perkin Warbeck (1830), the apocalyptic novel The Last Man (1826) and her final two novels, Lodore (1835) and Falkner (1837). Studies of her lesser-known works, such as the travel book Rambles in Germany and Italy (1844) and the biographical articles for Dionysius Lardner's Cabinet Cyclopaedia (1829–1846), support the growing view that Mary Shelley remained a political radical throughout her life. Mary Shelley's works often argue that cooperation and sympathy, particularly as practised by women in the family, were the ways to reform civil society. This view was a direct challenge to the individualistic Romantic ethos promoted by Percy Shelley and the Enlightenment political theories articulated by Mary's father, William Godwin.

== Life and career ==
=== Early life ===
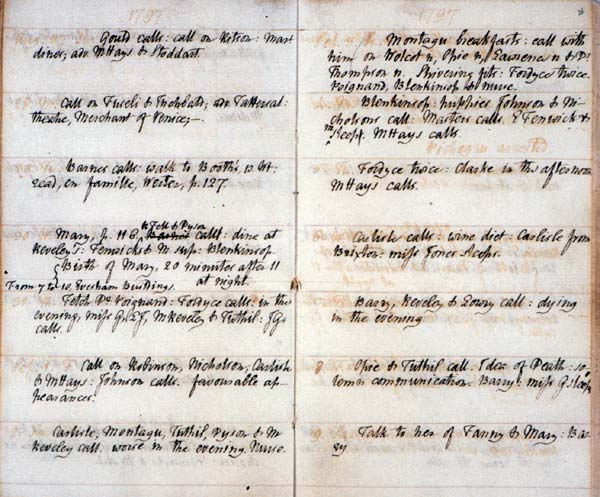
Page from William Godwin's journal recording "Birth of Mary, 20 minutes after 11 at night" (left column, fourth row)

Mary Shelley was born Mary Wollstonecraft Godwin in Somers Town, London, in 1797. She was the second child of the feminist philosopher, educator, and writer Mary Wollstonecraft and the first child of the philosopher, novelist, and journalist William Godwin. Wollstonecraft died of puerperal fever shortly after Mary was born. Godwin was left to bring up Mary, along with her older half-sister, Fanny Imlay, Wollstonecraft's child by the American speculator Gilbert Imlay. A year after Wollstonecraft's death, Godwin published his Memoirs of the Author of A Vindication of the Rights of Woman (1798), which he intended as a sincere and compassionate tribute. However, because the Memoirs revealed Wollstonecraft's affairs and her illegitimate child, they were seen as shocking. Mary Godwin read these memoirs and her mother's books, and was brought up to cherish her mother's memory.

Mary's earliest years were happy, judging from the letters of William Godwin's housekeeper and nurse, Louisa Jones. But Godwin was often deeply in debt; feeling that he could not raise the children by himself, he cast about for a second wife. In December 1801, he married Mary Jane Clairmont, a well-educated woman with two young children of her own – Charles and Claire. (Note: Claire's first name was "Jane", but from 1814 (see Gittings and Manton, 22) she preferred to be called "Claire" (her second name was "Clara"), which is how she is known to history. To avoid confusion, this article calls her "Claire" throughout.) Most of Godwin's friends disliked his new wife, describing her as quick-tempered and quarrelsome; (Note: William St Clair, in his biography of the Godwins and the Shelleys, notes that "it is easy to forget in reading of these crises [in the lives of the Godwins and the Shelleys] how unrepresentative the references in surviving documents may be. It is easy for the biographer to give undue weight to the opinions of the people who happen to have written things down." (246)) but Godwin was devoted to her, and the marriage was a success. Mary Godwin, in contrast, came to detest her stepmother. William Godwin's 19th-century biographer Charles Kegan Paul later suggested that Mrs Godwin had favoured her own children over those of Mary Wollstonecraft.

Together, the Godwins started a publishing firm called M. J. Godwin, which sold children's books as well as stationery, maps, and games. However, the business did not turn a profit, and Godwin was forced to borrow substantial sums to keep it going. He continued to borrow to pay off earlier loans, compounding his difficulties. By 1809, Godwin's business was close to failure, and he was "near to despair". Godwin was saved from debtor's prison by philosophical devotees such as Francis Place, who lent him further money.

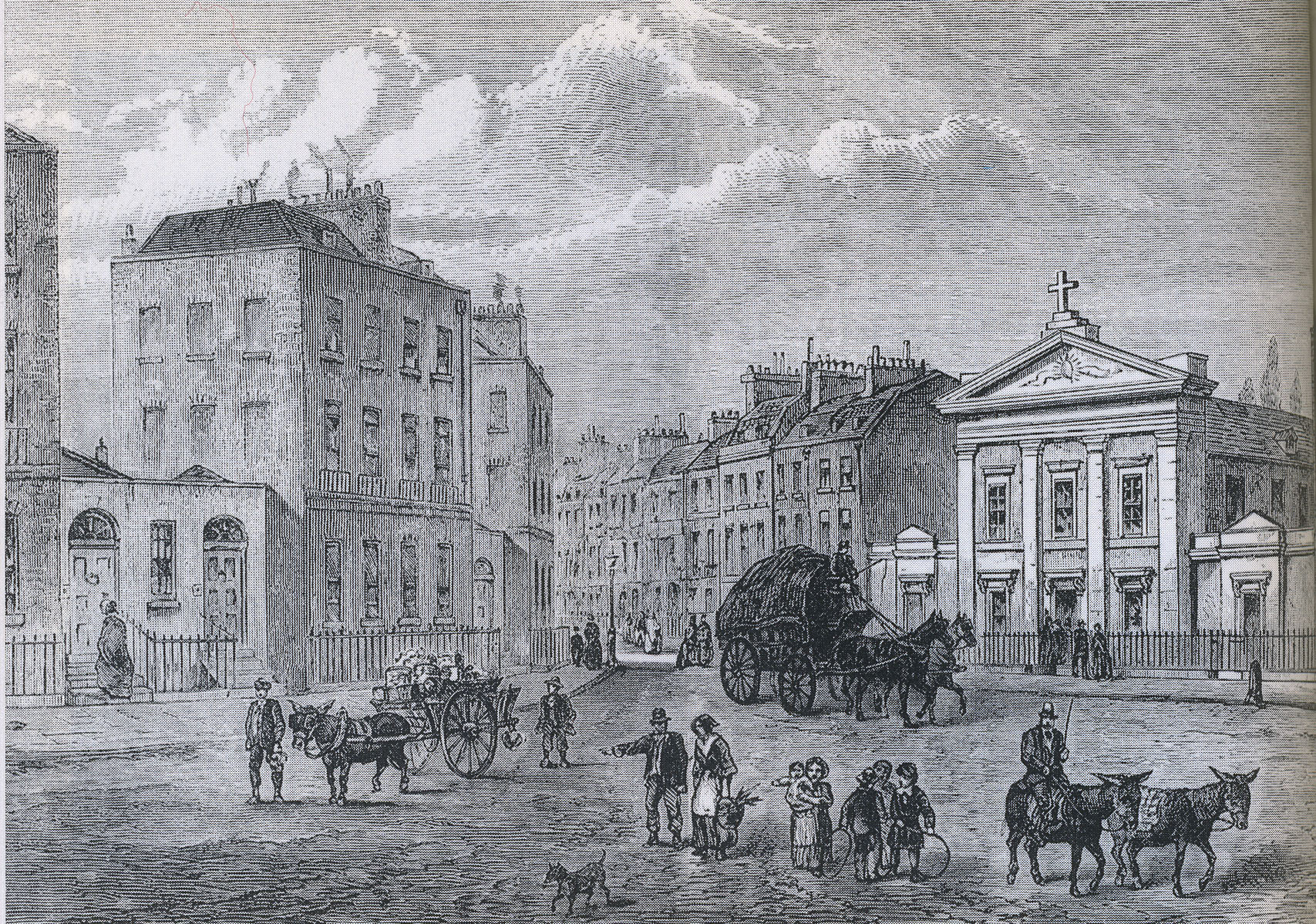
The Polygon (at left) in Somers Town, London, between Camden Town and St Pancras, where Mary Godwin was born and spent her earliest years

Though Mary Godwin received little formal education, her father tutored her in a broad range of subjects. He often took the children on educational outings, and they had access to his library and to the many intellectuals who visited him, including the Romantic poet Samuel Taylor Coleridge and the former vice-president of the United States Aaron Burr. Godwin admitted he was not educating the children according to Mary Wollstonecraft's philosophy as outlined in works such as A Vindication of the Rights of Woman (1792), but Mary Godwin nonetheless received an unusual and advanced education for a girl of the time. She had a governess and a daily tutor and read many of her father's children's books on Roman and Greek history in manuscript. For six months in 1811, she also attended a boarding school in Ramsgate. Her father described her at age 15 as "singularly bold, somewhat imperious, and active of mind. Her desire of knowledge is great, and her perseverance in everything she undertakes almost invincible."

In June 1812, Mary's father sent her to stay with the dissenting family of the radical William Baxter, near Dundee, Scotland. To Baxter, he wrote, "I am anxious that she should be brought up ... like a philosopher, even like a cynic." Scholars have speculated that she was sent away for her health, to remove her from the seamy side of the business, or to introduce her to radical politics. Mary Godwin revelled in the spacious surroundings of Baxter's house and in the companionship of his four daughters, and she returned north in the summer of 1813 for a further stay of 10 months. In the 1831 introduction to Frankenstein, she recalled: "I wrote then—but in a most common-place style. It was beneath the trees of the grounds belonging to our house, or on the bleak sides of the woodless mountains near, that my true compositions, the airy flights of my imagination, were born and fostered."

=== Percy Bysshe Shelley ===
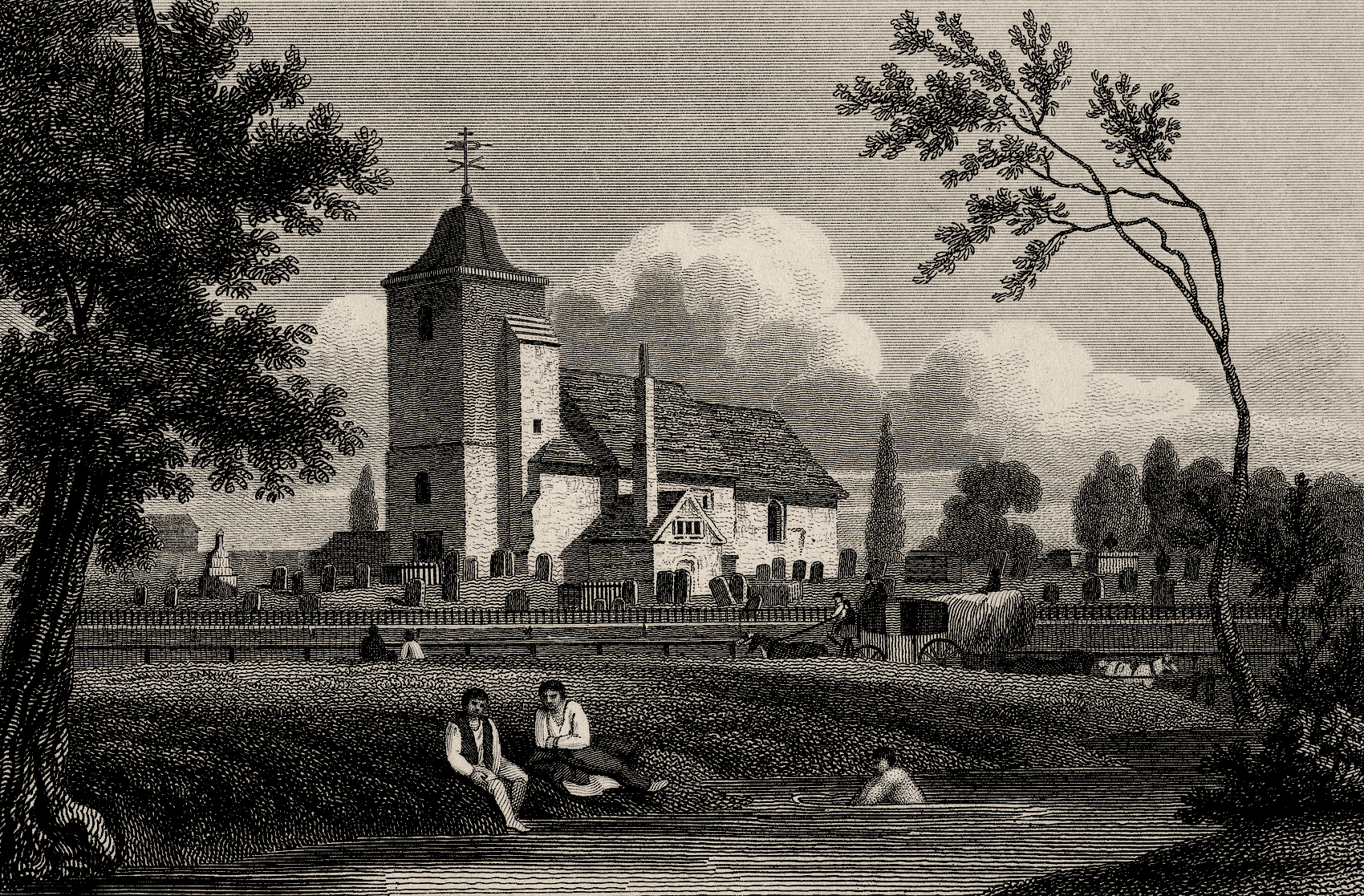
On 26 June 1814, Mary Godwin declared her love for Percy Shelley at Mary Wollstonecraft's graveside in the churchyard of St Pancras Old Church (shown here in 1815).

Mary Godwin may have first met the radical poet-philosopher Percy Bysshe Shelley in the interval between her two stays in Scotland. By the time she returned home for a second time on 30 March 1814, Percy Shelley had become estranged from his wife and was regularly visiting William Godwin, whom he had agreed to bail out of debt. Percy Shelley's radicalism, particularly his economic views, which he had imbibed from William Godwin's Political Justice (1793), had alienated him from his wealthy aristocratic family: they wanted him to follow traditional models of the landed aristocracy, and he wanted to donate large amounts of the family's money to schemes intended to help the disadvantaged. Percy Shelley, therefore, had difficulty gaining access to money until he inherited his estate because his family did not want him wasting it on projects of "political justice". After several months of promises, Shelley announced that he either could not or would not pay off all of Godwin's debts. Godwin was angry and felt betrayed.

Mary and Percy began meeting each other secretly at her mother Mary Wollstonecraft's grave in the churchyard of St Pancras Old Church, and they fell in love—she was 16, and he was 21. On 26 June 1814, Shelley and Godwin declared their love for each other as Shelley announced he could not hide his "ardent passion", leading her in a "sublime and rapturous moment" to say she felt the same way; on either that day or the next, Godwin lost her virginity to Shelley, which tradition claims happened in the churchyard against her mother's headstone. Godwin described herself as attracted to Shelley's "wild, intellectual, unearthly looks". To Mary's dismay, her father disapproved, and tried to thwart the relationship and salvage the "spotless fame" of his daughter. At about the same time, Mary's father learned of Shelley's inability to pay off the father's debts. Mary, who later wrote of "my excessive and romantic attachment to my father", was confused. She saw Percy Shelley as an embodiment of her parents' liberal and reformist ideas of the 1790s, particularly Godwin's view that marriage was a repressive monopoly, which he had argued in his 1793 edition of Political Justice but later retracted. On 28 July 1814, the couple eloped and secretly left for France, taking Mary's stepsister, Claire Clairmont, with them.

After convincing Mary Jane Godwin, who had pursued them to Calais, that they did not wish to return, the trio travelled to Paris, and then, by donkey, mule, carriage, and foot, through a France recently ravaged by war, to Switzerland. "It was acting in a novel, being an incarnate romance," Mary Shelley recalled in 1826. Godwin wrote about France in 1814: "The distress of the inhabitants, whose houses had been burned, their cattle killed and all their wealth destroyed, has given a sting to my detestation of war...". As they travelled, Mary and Percy read works by Mary Wollstonecraft and others, kept a joint journal, and continued their own writing. At Lucerne, lack of money forced the three to turn back. They travelled down the Rhine and by land to the Dutch port of Maassluis, arriving at Gravesend, Kent, on 13 September 1814.

In late September 1814, back in London, Mary Godwin read James Henry Lawrence's utopian romance The Empire of the Nairs (1811), a book Percy Shelley admired; Claire Clairmont recorded reading it a few days later. David S. Neff has argued that Frankenstein can be read as a reply to Lawrence's fatherless utopia, its bachelor scientist a "Lawrentian motherson" who brings destruction on everyone close to him; the historian Anne Verjus regards the connection as doubtful.

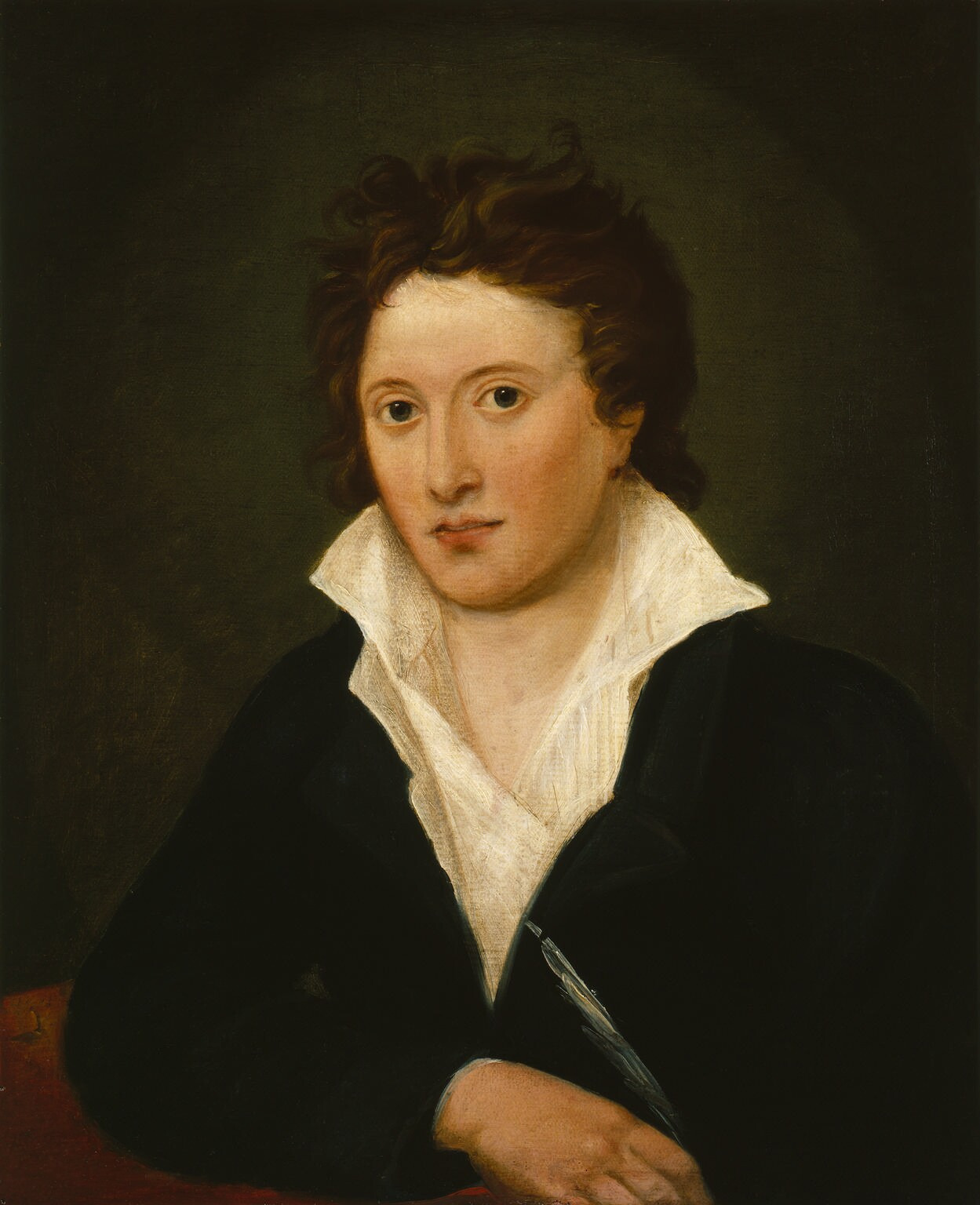
Percy Bysshe Shelley was inspired by the radicalism of Godwin's Political Justice (1793). When the poet Robert Southey met Shelley, he felt as if he were seeing himself from the 1790s. (Portrait by Amelia Curran, 1819.)

The situation awaiting Mary Godwin in England was fraught with complications, some of which she had not foreseen. Either before or during the journey, she had become pregnant. She and Percy now found themselves penniless, and, to Mary's genuine surprise, her father refused to have anything to do with her. The couple moved with Claire into lodgings at Somers Town, and later, Nelson Square. They maintained their intense programme of reading and writing, and entertained Percy Shelley's friends, such as Thomas Jefferson Hogg and the writer Thomas Love Peacock. Percy Shelley sometimes left home for short periods to dodge creditors. The couple's distraught letters reveal their pain at these separations.

Pregnant and often ill, Mary Godwin had to cope with Percy's joy at the birth of his son by Harriet Shelley in late 1814 and his constant outings with Claire Clairmont. (Note: "Journal 6 December—Very Unwell. Shelley & Clary walk out, as usual, to heaps of places...A letter from Hookham to say that Harriet has been brought to bed of a son and heir. Shelley writes a number of circular letters on this event, which ought to be ushered in with ringing of bells, etc., for it is the son of his wife" (quoted in Spark, 39).) Shelley and Clairmont were almost certainly lovers, which caused much jealousy on Godwin's part. Shelley greatly offended Godwin at one point when, during a walk in the French countryside, he suggested that they both take the plunge into a stream naked; this offended her principles. She was partly consoled by the visits of Hogg, whom she disliked at first but soon considered a close friend. Percy Shelley seems to have wanted Mary Godwin and Hogg to become lovers; Mary did not dismiss the idea, since in principle she believed in free love. In practice, however, she loved only Percy Shelley and seems to have ventured no further than flirting with Hogg. (Note: Sunstein speculates that Mary Shelley and Jefferson Hogg made love in April 1815. (Sunstein, 98–99)) On 22 February 1815, she gave birth to a two-months-premature baby girl, who was not expected to survive. On 6 March, she wrote to Hogg:

My dearest Hogg my baby is dead—will you come to see me as soon as you can. I wish to see you—It was perfectly well when I went to bed—I awoke in the night to give it suck it appeared to be sleeping so quietly that I would not awake it. It was dead then, but we did not find that out till morning—from its appearance it evidently died of convulsions—Will you come—you are so calm a creature & Shelley is afraid of a fever from the milk—for I am no longer a mother now.

The loss of her child induced acute depression in Mary Godwin, who was haunted by visions of the baby; but she conceived again and had recovered by the summer. With a revival in Percy Shelley's finances after the death of his grandfather, Sir Bysshe Shelley, the couple holidayed in Torquay and then rented a two-storey cottage at Bishopsgate, on the edge of Windsor Great Park. Little is known about this period in Mary Godwin's life, for her journal from May 1815 to July 1816 is lost. At Bishopsgate, Percy wrote his poem Alastor, or The Spirit of Solitude; and on 24 January 1816, Mary gave birth to a second child, William, named after her father, and soon nicknamed "Willmouse". In her novel The Last Man, she later imagined Windsor as a Garden of Eden.

=== Lake Geneva and Frankenstein ===
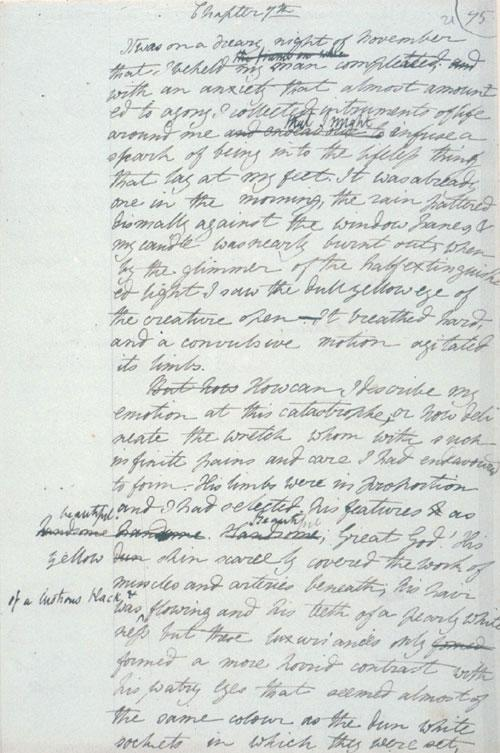
Draft of Frankenstein; or, The Modern Prometheus ("It was on a dreary night of November that I beheld my man completed ...")

In May 1816, Mary Godwin, Percy Shelley, and their son travelled to Geneva with Claire Clairmont. They planned to spend the summer with the poet Lord Byron, whose recent affair with Claire had left her pregnant. In History of a Six Weeks' Tour through a part of France, Switzerland, Germany and Holland (1817), she describes the particularly desolate landscape in crossing from France into Switzerland.

The party arrived in Geneva on 14 May 1816, where Mary called herself "Mrs Shelley". Byron joined them on 25 May, with his young physician, John William Polidori, and rented the Villa Diodati, close to Lake Geneva at the village of Cologny; Percy Shelley rented a smaller building called Maison Chapouis on the waterfront nearby. They spent their time writing, boating on the lake, and talking late into the night.

"It proved a wet, ungenial summer", Mary Shelley remembered in 1831, "and incessant rain often confined us for days to the house". (Note: The violent storms were, it is now known, a repercussion of the volcanic eruption of Mount Tambora in Indonesia in the previous year (Sunstein, 118). See also The Year Without a Summer.) Sitting around a log fire at Byron's villa, the company amused themselves with German ghost stories, which prompted Byron to propose that they "each write a ghost story". Unable to think of a story, young Mary Godwin became anxious: "Have you thought of a story? I was asked each morning, and each morning I was forced to reply with a mortifying negative." During one mid-June evening, the discussions turned to the nature of the principle of life. "Perhaps a corpse would be re-animated", Mary noted; "galvanism had given token of such things". It was after midnight before they retired, and unable to sleep, she became possessed by her imagination as she beheld the grim terrors of her "waking dream", her ghost story:

I saw the pale student of unhallowed arts kneeling beside the thing he had put together. I saw the hideous phantasm of a man stretched out, and then, on the working of some powerful engine, show signs of life, and stir with an uneasy, half vital motion. Frightful must it be; for supremely frightful would be the effect of any human endeavour to mock the stupendous mechanism of the Creator of the world. (Note: Seymour argues that evidence from Polidori's diary conflicts with Mary Shelley's account of when the idea came to her (157).)

She began writing what she assumed would be a short story. With Percy Shelley's encouragement, she expanded this tale into her first novel, Frankenstein; or, The Modern Prometheus, published on 1 January 1818. She later described that summer in Switzerland as the moment "when I first stepped out from childhood into life". The story of the writing of Frankenstein has been fictionalised several times and has formed the basis for a number of films.

In September 2011, the astronomer Donald Olson, after a visit to the Lake Geneva villa the previous year, and inspecting data about the motion of the moon and stars, concluded that her waking dream took place "between 2am and 3am" on 16 June 1816, several days after the initial idea by Lord Byron that they each write a ghost story.

=== Authorship of Frankenstein ===
While her husband Percy encouraged her writing, the extent of Percy's contribution to the novel is unknown and has been argued over by readers and critics. Mary Shelley wrote, "I certainly did not owe the suggestion of one incident, nor scarcely of one train of feeling, to my husband, and yet but for his incitement, it would never have taken the form in which it was presented to the world." She wrote that the preface to the first edition was Percy's work "as far as I can recollect". There are differences in the 1818, 1823 and 1831 editions, which have been attributed to Percy's editing. James Rieger concluded Percy's "assistance at every point in the book's manufacture was so extensive that one hardly knows whether to regard him as editor or minor collaborator", while Anne K. Mellor later argued Percy only "made many technical corrections and several times clarified the narrative and thematic continuity of the text." Charles E. Robinson, editor of a facsimile edition of the Frankenstein manuscripts, concluded that Percy's contributions to the book "were no more than what most publishers' editors have provided new (or old) authors or, in fact, what colleagues have provided to each other after reading each other's works in progress."

Writing on the 200th anniversary of Frankenstein, literary scholar and poet Fiona Sampson asked, "Why hasn't Mary Shelley gotten the respect she deserves?" She noted that "In recent years Percy's corrections, visible in the Frankenstein notebooks held at the Bodleian Library in Oxford, have been seized on as evidence that he must have at least co-authored the novel. In fact, when I examined the notebooks myself, I realized that Percy did rather less than any line editor working in publishing today." Sampson published her findings in In Search of Mary Shelley (2018), one of many biographies written about Shelley.

=== Bath and Marlow ===
On their return to England in September 1816, Mary and Percy moved—with Claire Clairmont, who took lodgings nearby—to Bath, where they hoped to keep Claire's pregnancy secret. At Cologny, Mary Godwin had received two letters from her half-sister, Fanny Imlay, who alluded to her "unhappy life"; on 9 October, Fanny wrote an "alarming letter" from Bristol that sent Percy Shelley racing off to search for her, without success. On the morning of 10 October, Fanny Imlay was found dead in a room at a Swansea inn, along with a suicide note and a laudanum bottle. On 10 December, Percy Shelley's wife, Harriet, was discovered drowned in the Serpentine, a lake in Hyde Park, London. Both suicides were hushed up. Harriet's family obstructed Percy Shelley's efforts—fully supported by Mary Godwin—to assume custody of his two children by Harriet. His lawyers advised him to improve his case by marrying; so he and Mary, who was pregnant again, married on 30 December 1816 at St Mildred's Church, Bread Street, London. Her father gave consent to her marriage as required for a minor aged under twenty-one and Mr and Mrs Godwin were present as witnesses who signed the register, the marriage ending the family rift.

Claire Clairmont gave birth to a baby girl on 13 January, at first called Alba, later Allegra. (Note: Alba was renamed "Allegra" in 1818. (Seymour, 177)) In March of that year, the Chancery Court ruled Percy Shelley morally unfit to assume custody of his children and later placed them with a clergyman's family. Also in March, the Shelleys moved with Claire and Alba to Albion House at Marlow, Buckinghamshire, a large, damp building on the river Thames. There Mary Shelley gave birth to her third child, Clara, on 2 September. At Marlow, they entertained their new friends Marianne and Leigh Hunt, worked hard at their writing, and often discussed politics.

Early in the summer of 1817, Mary Shelley finished Frankenstein, which was published anonymously in January 1818. Reviewers and readers assumed that Percy Shelley was the author, since the book was published with his preface and dedicated to his political hero William Godwin. At Marlow, Mary edited the joint journal of the group's 1814 Continental journey, adding material written in Switzerland in 1816, along with Percy's poem "Mont Blanc". The result was the History of a Six Weeks' Tour, published in November 1817. That autumn, Percy Shelley often lived away from home in London to evade creditors. The threat of a debtor's prison, combined with their ill health and fears of losing custody of their children, contributed to the couple's decision to leave England for Italy on 12 March 1818, taking Claire Clairmont and Alba with them. They had no intention of returning.

=== Italy ===
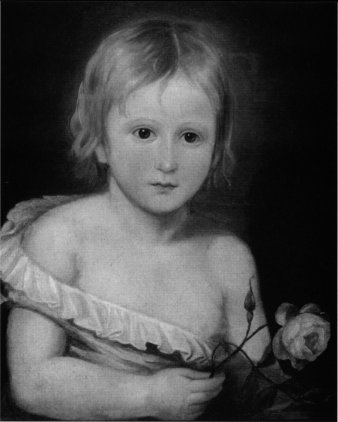
William "Willmouse" Shelley, painted just before his death from malaria in 1819 (portrait by Amelia Curran, 1819)

One of the party's first tasks on arriving in Italy was to hand Alba over to Byron, who was living in Venice. He had agreed to raise her so long as Claire had nothing more to do with her. The Shelleys then embarked on a roving existence, never settling in any one place for long. (Note: At various times, the Shelleys lived at Livorno, Bagni di Lucca, Venice, Este, Naples, Rome, Florence, Pisa, Bagni di Pisa, and San Terenzo.) Along the way, they accumulated a circle of friends and acquaintances who often moved with them. The couple devoted their time to writing, reading, learning, sightseeing, and socialising. The Italian adventure was, however, blighted for Mary Shelley by the deaths of both her children—Clara, in September 1818 in Venice, and William, in June 1819 in Rome. (Note: Clara died of dysentery at the age of one, and William of malaria at three and a half. (Seymour, 214, 231)) These losses left her in a deep depression that isolated her from Percy Shelley, who wrote in his notebook:

My dearest Mary, wherefore hast thou gone,
And left me in this dreary world alone?
Thy form is here indeed—a lovely one—
But thou art fled, gone down a dreary road
That leads to Sorrow's most obscure abode.
For thine own sake I cannot follow thee
Do thou return for mine.

For a time, Mary Shelley found comfort only in her writing. The birth of her fourth child, Percy Florence, on 12 November 1819, finally lifted her spirits, though she nursed the memory of her lost children till the end of her life.

Italy provided the Shelleys, Byron, and other exiles with political freedom unattainable at home. Despite its associations with personal loss, Italy became for Mary Shelley "a country which memory painted as paradise". Their Italian years were a time of intense intellectual and creative activity for both Shelleys. While Percy composed a series of major poems, Mary wrote the novel Matilda, the historical novel Valperga, and the plays Proserpine and Midas. Mary wrote Valperga to help alleviate her father's financial difficulties, as Percy refused to assist him further. She was often physically ill, however, and prone to depressions. She also had to cope with Percy's interest in other women, such as Sophia Stacey, Emilia Viviani, and Jane Williams. Since Mary Shelley shared his belief in the non-exclusivity of marriage, she formed emotional ties of her own among the men and women of their circle. She became particularly fond of the Greek revolutionary Prince Alexandros Mavrokordatos and of Jane and Edward Williams. (Note: The Williamses were not technically married; Jane was still the wife of an army officer named Johnson.)

In December 1818, the Shelleys travelled south with Claire Clairmont and their servants to Naples, where they stayed for three months, receiving only one visitor, a physician. In 1820, they found themselves plagued by accusations and threats from Paolo and Elise Foggi, former servants whom Percy Shelley had dismissed in Naples shortly after the Foggis had married. The pair revealed that on 27 February 1819 in Naples, Percy Shelley had registered as his child by Mary Shelley a two-month-old baby girl named Elena Adelaide Shelley. The Foggis also claimed that Claire Clairmont was the baby's mother. Biographers have offered various interpretations of these events: that Percy Shelley decided to adopt a local child; that the baby was his by Elise, Claire, or an unknown woman; or that she was Elise's by Byron. (Note: Elise had been employed by Byron as Allegra's nurse. Mary Shelley stated in a letter that Elise had been pregnant by Paolo at the time, which was the reason they had married, but not that she had had a child in Naples. Elise seems to have first met Paolo only in September. See Mary Shelley's letter to Isabella Hoppner, 10 August 1821, Selected Letters, 75–79.) Mary Shelley insisted she would have known if Claire had been pregnant, but it is unclear how much she really knew. The events in Naples, a city Mary Shelley later called a paradise inhabited by devils, remain shrouded in mystery. (Note: "Establishing Elena Adelaide's parentage is one of the greatest bafflements Shelley left for his biographers." (Bieri, 106)) The only certainty is that she herself was not the child's mother. Elena Adelaide Shelley died in Naples on 9 June 1820.

After leaving Naples, the Shelleys settled in Rome, the city where her husband wrote "the meanest streets were strewed with truncated columns, broken capitals...and sparkling fragments of granite or porphyry...The voice of dead time, in still vibrations, is breathed from these dumb things, animated and glorified as they were by man". Rome inspired her to begin writing the unfinished novel Valerius, the Reanimated Roman, where the eponymous hero resists the decay of Rome and the machinations of "superstitious" Catholicism. The writing of her novel was broken off when her son William died of malaria. Shelley bitterly commented that she had come to Italy to improve her husband's health, and instead the Italian climate had just killed her two children, leading her to write: "May you my dear Marianne never know what it is to lose two only and lovely children in one year—to watch their dying moments—and then at last to be left childless and forever miserable". To deal with her grief, Shelley wrote the novella The Fields of Fancy, which became Matilda, dealing with a young woman whose beauty inspired incestuous love in her father, who ultimately commits suicide to stop himself from acting on his passion for his daughter, while she spends the rest of her life full of despair about "the unnatural love I had inspired". The novella offered a feminist critique of a patriarchal society as Matilda is punished in the afterlife, though she did nothing to encourage her father's feelings.

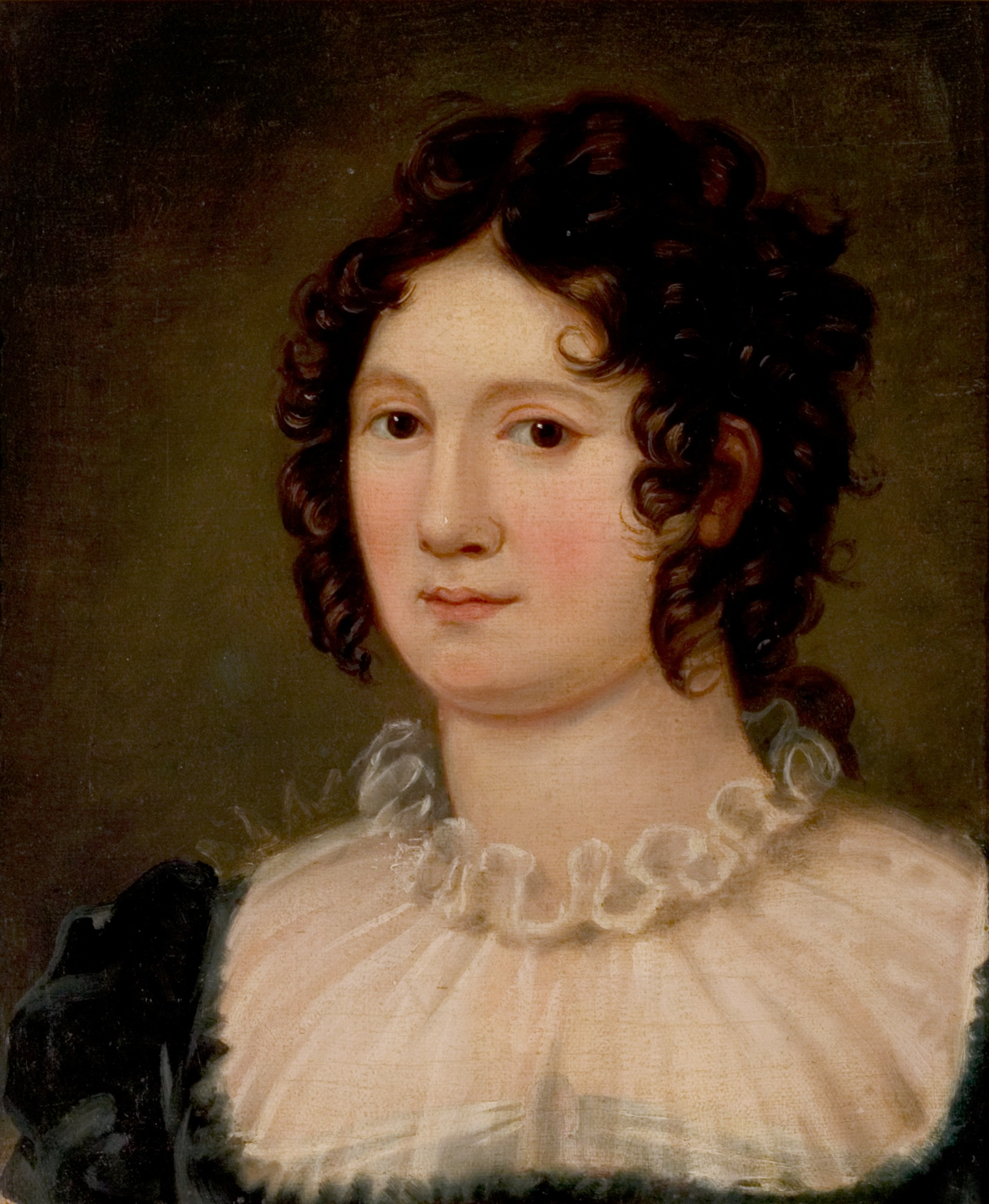
Claire Clairmont, Mary's stepsister and mistress of Lord Byron (portrait by Amelia Curran, 1819)

In the summer of 1822, a pregnant Mary moved with Percy, Claire, and Edward and Jane Williams to the isolated Villa Magni, at the sea's edge near the hamlet of San Terenzo in the Bay of Lerici. Once they were settled in, Percy broke the "evil news" to Claire that her daughter Allegra had died of typhus in a convent at Bagnacavallo. Mary Shelley was distracted and unhappy in the cramped and remote Villa Magni, which she came to regard as a dungeon. On 16 June, she miscarried, losing so much blood that she nearly died. Rather than wait for a doctor, Percy sat her in a bath of ice to stanch the bleeding, an act the doctor later told him saved her life. All was not well between the couple that summer, however, and Percy spent more time with Jane Williams than with his depressed and debilitated wife. Much of the short poetry Shelley wrote at San Terenzo involved Jane rather than Mary.

The coast offered Percy Shelley and Edward Williams the chance to enjoy their "perfect plaything for the summer", a new sailing boat. The boat had been designed by Daniel Roberts and an admirer of Byron, Edward Trelawny, who had joined the party in January 1822. On 1 July 1822, Percy Shelley, Edward Ellerker Williams, and Captain Daniel Roberts sailed south down the coast to Livorno. There Percy Shelley discussed with Byron and Leigh Hunt the launch of a radical magazine called The Liberal. On 8 July, he and Edward Williams set out on the return journey to Lerici with their eighteen-year-old boat boy, Charles Vivian. They never reached their destination. A letter arrived at Villa Magni from Hunt to Percy Shelley, dated 8 July, saying, "pray write to tell us how you got home, for they say you had bad weather after you sailed Monday & we are anxious". "The paper fell from me," Mary told a friend later. "I trembled all over." She and Jane Williams rushed desperately to Livorno and then to Pisa in the fading hope that their husbands were still alive. Ten days after the storm, three bodies washed up on the coast near Viareggio, midway between Livorno and Lerici. Trelawny, Byron, and Hunt cremated Percy Shelley's corpse on the beach at Viareggio.

=== Return to England and writing career ===
"[Frankenstein] is the most wonderful work to have been written at twenty years of age that I ever heard of. You are now five and twenty. And, most fortunately, you have pursued a course of reading and cultivated your mind in a manner the most admirably adapted to make you a great and successful author. If you cannot be independent, who should be?"

— William Godwin to Mary Shelley

After her husband's death, Mary Shelley lived for a year with Leigh Hunt and his family in Genoa, where she often saw Byron and transcribed his poems. She resolved to live by her pen and for her son, but her financial situation was precarious. On 23 July 1823, she left Genoa for England and stayed with her father and stepmother in the Strand until a small advance from her father-in-law enabled her to lodge nearby. Sir Timothy Shelley had at first agreed to support his grandson, Percy Florence, only if he were handed over to an appointed guardian. Mary Shelley rejected this idea instantly. She managed instead to wring out of Sir Timothy a limited annual allowance (which she had to repay when Percy Florence inherited the estate), but to the end of his days, he refused to meet her in person and dealt with her only through lawyers. Mary Shelley busied herself with editing her husband's poems, among other literary endeavours, but concern for her son restricted her options. Sir Timothy threatened to stop the allowance if any biography of the poet were published. In 1826, Percy Florence became the legal heir of the Shelley estate after the death of his half-brother Charles Shelley, his father's son by Harriet Shelley. Sir Timothy raised Mary's allowance from £100 a year to £250 but remained as difficult as ever. Mary Shelley enjoyed the stimulating society of William Godwin's circle, but poverty prevented her from socialising as she wished. She also felt ostracised by those who, like Sir Timothy, still disapproved of her relationship with Percy Bysshe Shelley.

On 29 August 1823, she attended a performance of Presumption; or, the Fate of Frankenstein, the first stage adaptation of her novel, at the English Opera House in the West End. The popularity of the play caused a second printing of Shelley's novel and a proliferation of other theatrical adaptations. In the summer of 1824, Mary Shelley moved to Kentish Town in north London to be near Jane Williams. She may have been, in the words of her biographer Muriel Spark, "a little in love" with Jane. Jane later disillusioned her by gossiping that Percy had preferred her to Mary, owing to Mary's inadequacy as a wife. At around this time, Mary Shelley was working on her novel, The Last Man (1826); and she assisted a series of friends who were writing memoirs of Byron and Percy Shelley—the beginnings of her attempts to immortalise her husband. She also met the American actor John Howard Payne and the American writer Washington Irving, who intrigued her. Payne fell in love with her and in 1826 asked her to marry him. She refused, saying that after being married to one genius, she could only marry another. Payne accepted the rejection, and tried – without success – to talk his friend Irving into proposing himself. Mary Shelley was aware of Payne's plan, but how seriously she took it is unclear.

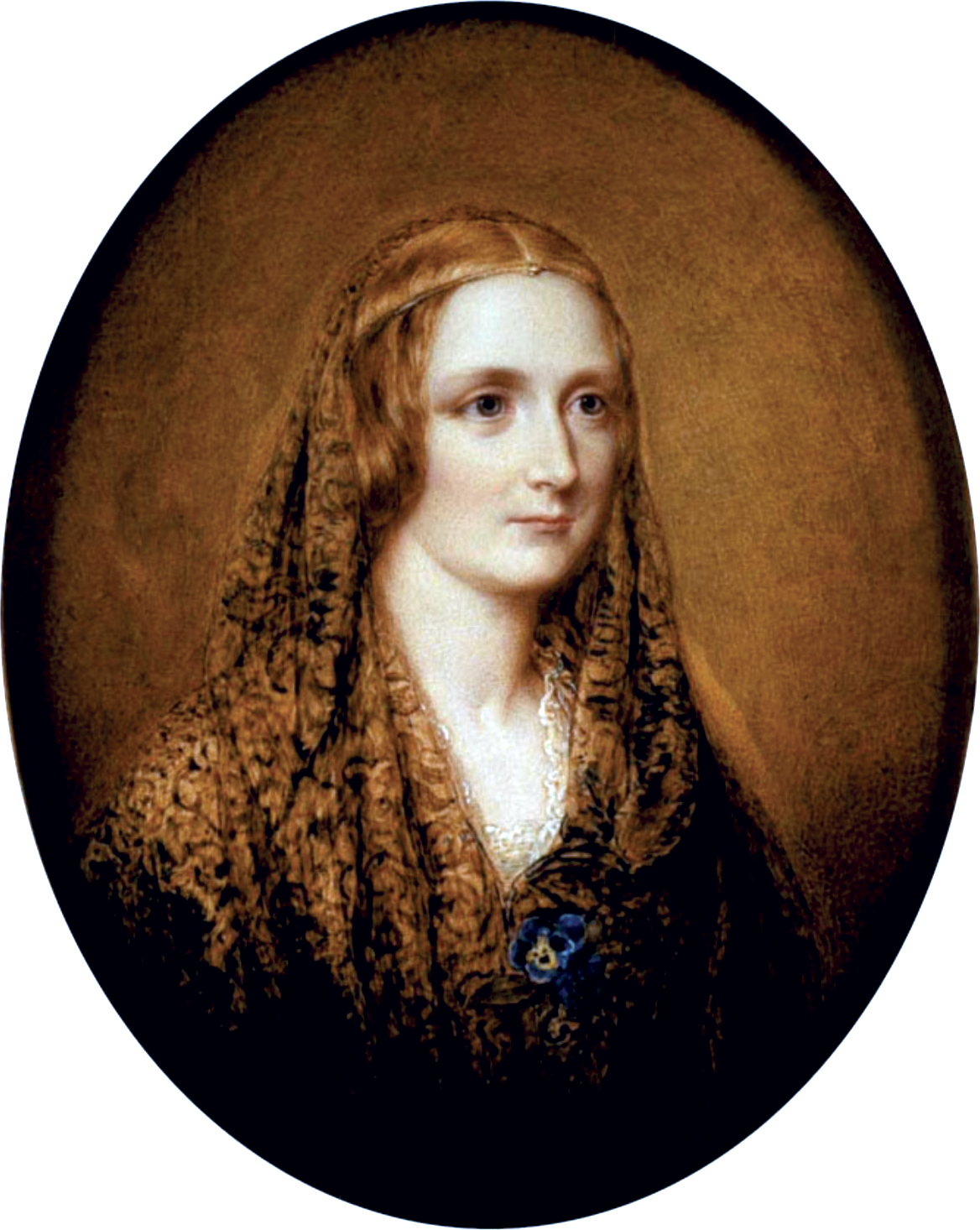
Reginald Easton's miniature of Mary Shelley is allegedly drawn from her death mask (c. 1857).

In 1827, Mary Shelley was party to a scheme that enabled her friend Isabel Robinson and Isabel's lover, Mary Diana Dods, who wrote under the name David Lyndsay, to embark on a life together in France as husband and wife. (Note: Dods, who had an infant daughter, assumed the name Walter Sholto Douglas and was accepted in France as a man.) With the help of Payne, whom she kept in the dark about the details, Mary Shelley obtained false passports for the couple. In 1828, she fell ill with smallpox while visiting them in Paris; weeks later she recovered, unscarred but without her youthful beauty.

During the period 1827–40, Mary Shelley was busy as an editor and writer. She wrote the novels The Fortunes of Perkin Warbeck (1830), Lodore (1835), and Falkner (1837). She contributed five volumes of Lives of Italian, Spanish, Portuguese, and French authors to Dionysius Lardner's Cabinet Cyclopaedia. She also wrote stories for ladies' magazines. She was still helping to support her father, and they looked out for publishers for each other. In 1830, she sold the copyright for a new edition of Frankenstein for £60 to Henry Colburn and Richard Bentley for their new Standard Novels series. After her father's death in 1836 at the age of eighty, she began assembling his letters and a memoir for publication, as he had requested in his will; but after two years of work, she abandoned the project. Throughout this period, she also championed Percy Shelley's poetry, promoting its publication and quoting it in her writing. By 1837, Percy's works were well-known and increasingly admired. In the summer of 1838 Edward Moxon, the publisher of Tennyson and the son-in-law of Charles Lamb, proposed publishing an edition of the collected works of Percy Shelley. Mary wanted to include in this collection an unexpurgated version of Percy Shelley's epic poem Queen Mab. Moxon wanted to leave out the most radical passages as too shocking and atheistical, but Mary prevailed, thanks to Harriet de Boinville, who agreed to Mary's request to borrow her own original copy gifted by Percy Shelley. Mary was paid £500 to edit the Poetical Works (1838), which Sir Timothy insisted should not include a biography. Mary found a way to tell the story of Percy's life, nonetheless: she included extensive biographical notes about the poems.

Shelley continued to practise her mother's feminist principles by extending aid to women of whom society disapproved. For instance, Shelley extended financial aid to Mary Diana Dods, a single mother and illegitimate herself, who appears to have been a lesbian, and gave her the new identity of Walter Sholto Douglas, husband of her lover Isabel Robinson. Shelley also assisted Georgiana Paul, a woman disallowed for by her husband for alleged adultery. Shelley wrote in her diary about her assistance to the latter: "I do not make a boast-I do not say aloud-behold my generosity and greatness of mind-for in truth it is simple justice I perform-and so I am still reviled for being worldly".

Mary Shelley continued to treat potential romantic partners with caution. In 1828, she met and flirted with the French writer Prosper Mérimée, but her one surviving letter to him appears to be a deflection of his declaration of love. She was delighted when her old friend from Italy, Edward Trelawny, returned to England, and they joked about marriage in their letters. Their friendship had altered, however, following her refusal to cooperate with his proposed biography of Percy Shelley; and he later reacted angrily to her omission of the atheistic section of Queen Mab from Percy Shelley's poems. Oblique references in her journals, from the early 1830s until the early 1840s, suggest that Mary Shelley had feelings for the radical politician Aubrey Beauclerk, who may have disappointed her by twice marrying others. (Note: Beauclerk married Ida Goring in 1838 and, after Ida's death, Mary Shelley's friend Rosa Robinson in 1841. A clear picture of Mary Shelley's relationship with Beauclerk is difficult to reconstruct from the evidence. (Seymour, 425–426))

Mary Shelley's first concern during these years was the welfare of Percy Florence. She honoured her late husband's wish that his son attend public school and, with Sir Timothy's grudging help, had him educated at Harrow. To avoid boarding fees, she moved to Harrow on the Hill herself so that Percy could attend as a day scholar. Though Percy went on to Trinity College, Cambridge, and dabbled in politics and the law, he showed no sign of his parents' gifts.

=== Final years and death ===
In 1840 and 1842, mother and son travelled together on the continent, journeys that Mary Shelley recorded in Rambles in Germany and Italy in 1840, 1842 and 1843 (1844). In 1844, Sir Timothy Shelley finally died at the age of ninety, "falling from the stalk like an overblown flower", as Mary put it. For the first time, she and her son were financially independent, though the estate proved less valuable than they had hoped.

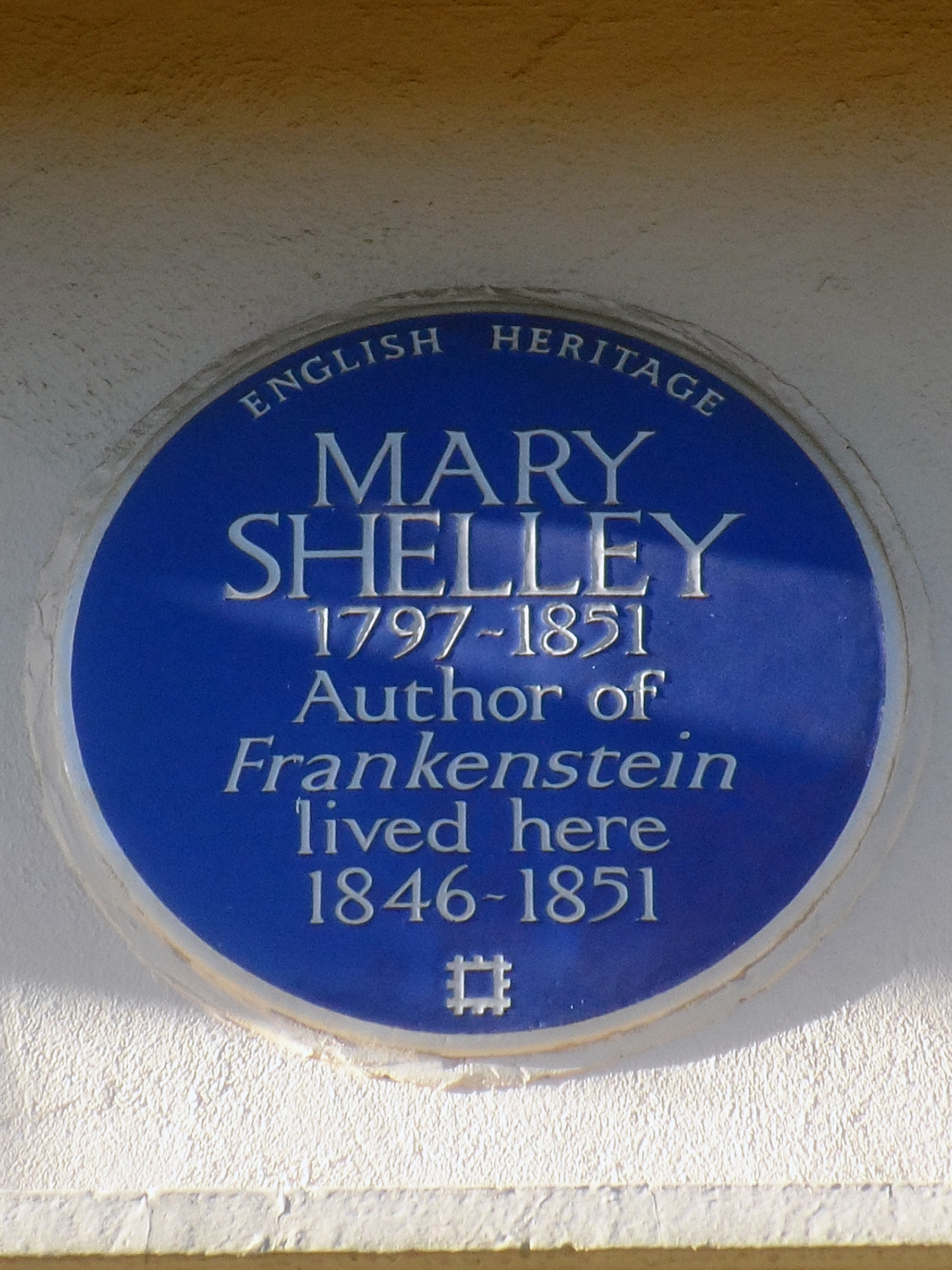
English Heritage blue plaque in Chester Square, Belgravia, London, where Shelley lived in her final years

In the mid-1840s, Mary Shelley found herself the target of three separate blackmailers. In 1845, an Italian political exile called Gatteschi, whom she had met in Paris, threatened to publish letters she had sent him. A friend of her son bribed a police chief into seizing Gatteschi's papers, including the letters, which were then destroyed. Shortly afterwards, Mary Shelley bought some letters written by herself and Percy Bysshe Shelley from a man calling himself G. Byron and posing as the illegitimate son of the late Lord Byron. Also in 1845, Percy Bysshe Shelley's cousin Thomas Medwin approached her, claiming to have written a damaging biography of Percy Shelley. He said he would suppress it in return for £250, but Mary Shelley refused. (Note: According to Bieri, Medwin claimed to possess evidence relating to Naples. Medwin is the source for the theory that the child registered by Percy Shelley in Naples was his daughter by a mystery woman. See also, Journals, 249–250 n3.)

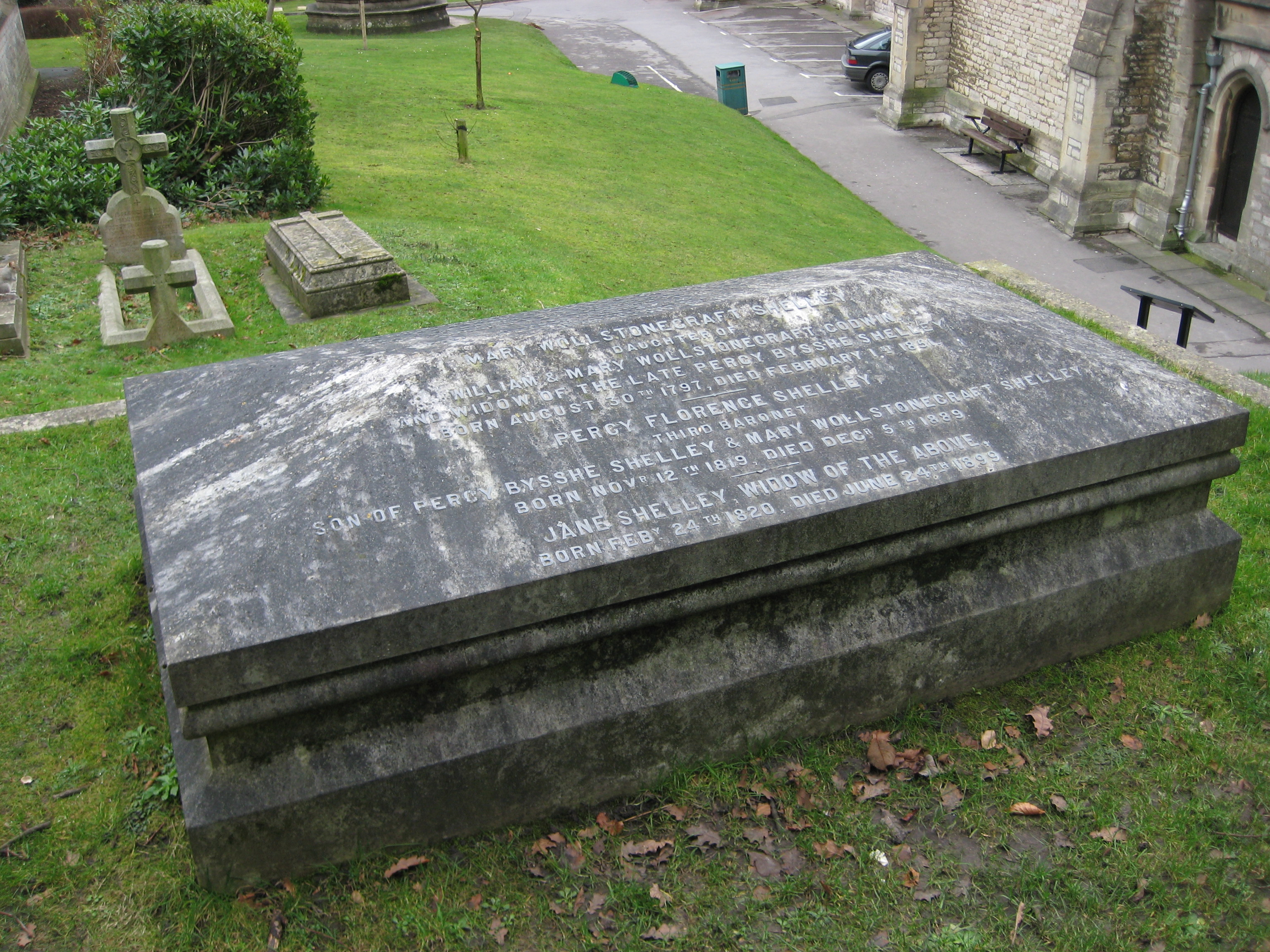
In order to fulfil Shelley's wishes, Percy Florence and his wife Jane had the coffins of her parents exhumed and buried with her in Bournemouth.

In 1848, Percy Florence married Jane Gibson St John. The marriage proved a happy one, and Mary Shelley and Jane were fond of each other. Mary lived with her son and daughter-in-law at Field Place, Sussex, the Shelleys' ancestral home, and at Chester Square, London, and accompanied them on travels abroad.

Mary Shelley's last years were blighted by illness. From 1839, she suffered from headaches and bouts of paralysis in parts of her body, which sometimes prevented her from reading and writing. On 1 February 1851, at Chester Square, she died at the age of fifty-three from what her physician suspected was a brain tumour. According to Jane Shelley, Mary Shelley had asked to be buried with her mother and father; but Percy and Jane, judging the graveyard at St Pancras to be "dreadful", chose to bury her instead at St Peter's Church, Bournemouth, near their new home at Boscombe. On the first anniversary of Mary Shelley's death, the Shelleys opened her box-desk. Inside they found locks of her dead children's hair, a notebook she had shared with Percy Bysshe Shelley, and a copy of his poem Adonaïs with one page folded round a silk parcel containing some of his ashes and the remains of his heart.

== Literary themes and styles ==
Mary Shelley lived a literary life. Her father encouraged her to learn to write by composing letters, and her favourite occupation as a child was writing stories. All of Mary's juvenilia were lost when she ran off with Percy in 1814, and none of her surviving manuscripts can be definitively dated before that year. Her first published work is often thought to have been Mounseer Nongtongpaw, comic verses written for Godwin's Juvenile Library when she was ten and a half; however, the poem is attributed to another writer in the most recent authoritative collection of her works. Percy Shelley enthusiastically encouraged Mary Shelley's writing: "My husband was, from the first, very anxious that I should prove myself worthy of my parentage, and enrol myself on the page of fame. He was forever inciting me to obtain literary reputation."

=== Novels ===
==== Autobiographical elements ====
Certain sections of Mary Shelley's novels are often interpreted as masked rewritings of her life. Critics have pointed to the recurrence of the father–daughter motif in particular as evidence of this autobiographical style. For example, commentators frequently read Mathilda (1820) autobiographically, identifying the three central characters as versions of Mary Shelley, William Godwin, and Percy Shelley. Mary Shelley herself confided that she modelled the central characters of The Last Man on her Italian circle. Lord Raymond, who leaves England to fight for the Greeks and dies in Constantinople, is based on Lord Byron; and the utopian Adrian, Earl of Windsor, who leads his followers in search of a natural paradise and dies when his boat sinks in a storm, is a fictional portrait of Percy Bysshe Shelley. However, as she wrote in her review of Godwin's novel Cloudesley (1830), she did not believe that authors "were merely copying from our own hearts". William Godwin regarded his daughter's characters as types rather than portraits from real life. Some modern critics, such as Patricia Clemit and Jane Blumberg, have taken the same view, resisting autobiographical readings of Mary Shelley's works.

==== Novelistic genres ====
"[Euthanasia] was never heard of more; even her name perished....The private chronicles, from which the foregoing relation has been collected, end with the death of Euthanasia. It is therefore in public histories alone that we find an account of the last years of the life of Castruccio."

— From Mary Shelley, Valperga

Mary Shelley employed the techniques of many different novelistic genres, most vividly the Godwinian novel, Walter Scott's new historical novel, and the Gothic novel. The Godwinian novel, made popular during the 1790s with works such as Godwin's Caleb Williams (1794), "employed a Rousseauvian confessional form to explore the contradictory relations between the self and society", and Frankenstein exhibits many of the same themes and literary devices as Godwin's novel. However, Shelley critiques those Enlightenment ideals that Godwin promotes in his works. In The Last Man, she uses the philosophical form of the Godwinian novel to demonstrate the ultimate meaninglessness of the world. While earlier Godwinian novels had shown how rational individuals could slowly improve society, The Last Man and Frankenstein demonstrate the individual's lack of control over history.

Shelley uses the historical novel to comment on gender relations; for example, Valperga is a feminist version of Scott's masculinist genre. Introducing women into the story who are not part of the historical record, Shelley uses their narratives to question established theological and political institutions. Shelley sets the male protagonist's compulsive greed for conquest in opposition to a female alternative: reason and sensibility. In Perkin Warbeck, Shelley's other historical novel, Lady Gordon stands for the values of friendship, domesticity, and equality. Through her, Shelley offers a feminine alternative to the masculine power politics that destroy the male characters. The novel provides a more inclusive historical narrative to challenge the one which usually relates only masculine events.

==== Gender ====
With the rise of feminist literary criticism in the 1970s, Mary Shelley's works, particularly Frankenstein, began to attract much more attention from scholars. Feminist and psychoanalytic critics were largely responsible for the recovery from neglect of Shelley as a writer. Ellen Moers was one of the first to claim that Shelley's loss of a baby was a crucial influence on the writing of Frankenstein. She argues that the novel is a "birth myth" in which Shelley comes to terms with her guilt for causing her mother's death as well as for failing as a parent. Shelley scholar Anne K. Mellor suggests that, from a feminist viewpoint, it is a story "about what happens when a man tries to have a baby without a woman ... [Frankenstein] is profoundly concerned with natural as opposed to unnatural modes of production and reproduction". Victor Frankenstein's failure as a "parent" in the novel has been read as an expression of the anxieties which accompany pregnancy, giving birth, and particularly maternity.

Sandra Gilbert and Susan Gubar argue in their seminal book The Madwoman in the Attic (1979) that in Frankenstein in particular, Shelley responded to the masculine literary tradition represented by John Milton's Paradise Lost. In their interpretation, Shelley reaffirms this masculine tradition, including the misogyny inherent in it, but at the same time "conceal[s] fantasies of equality that occasionally erupt in monstrous images of rage". Mary Poovey reads the first edition of Frankenstein as part of a larger pattern in Shelley's writing, which begins with literary self-assertion and ends with conventional femininity. Poovey suggests that Frankenstein's multiple narratives enable Shelley to split her artistic persona: she can "express and efface herself at the same time". Shelley's fear of self-assertion is reflected in the fate of Frankenstein, who is punished for his egotism by losing all his domestic ties.

Feminist critics sometimes focus on how authorship itself, particularly female authorship, is represented in and through Shelley's novels. Mellor argues that Shelley uses the Gothic style not only to explore repressed female sexual desire but also as way to "censor her own speech in Frankenstein". According to Poovey and Mellor, Shelley did not want to promote her own authorial persona and felt deeply inadequate as a writer, and "this shame contributed to the generation of her fictional images of abnormality, perversion, and destruction".

Shelley's writings focus on the role of the family in society and women's role within that family. She celebrates the "feminine affections and compassion" associated with the family and suggests that civil society will fail without them. Shelley was "profoundly committed to an ethic of cooperation, mutual dependence, and self-sacrifice". In Lodore, for example, the central story follows the fortunes of the wife and daughter of the title character, Lord Lodore, who is killed in a duel at the end of the first volume, leaving a trail of legal, financial, and familial obstacles for the two "heroines" to negotiate. The novel is engaged with political and ideological issues, particularly the education and social role of women. It dissects a patriarchal culture that separated the sexes and pressured women into dependence on men. In the view of Shelley scholar Betty T. Bennett, "the novel proposes egalitarian educational paradigms for women and men, which would bring social justice as well as the spiritual and intellectual means by which to meet the challenges life invariably brings". However, Falkner is the only one of Mary Shelley's novels in which the heroine's agenda triumphs. The novel's resolution proposes that when female values triumph over violent and destructive masculinity, men will be freed to express the "compassion, sympathy, and generosity" of their better natures.

==== Enlightenment and Romanticism ====
Frankenstein, like much Gothic fiction of the period, mixes a visceral and alienating subject matter with speculative and thought-provoking themes. Rather than focusing on the twists and turns of the plot, however, the novel foregrounds the mental and moral struggles of the protagonist, Victor Frankenstein, and Shelley imbues the text with her own brand of politicised Romanticism, one that criticised the individualism and egotism of traditional Romanticism. Victor Frankenstein is like Satan in Paradise Lost, and Prometheus: he rebels against tradition; he creates life; and he shapes his own destiny. These traits are not portrayed positively; as Blumberg writes, "his relentless ambition is a self-delusion, clothed as quest for truth". He must abandon his family to fulfill his ambition.

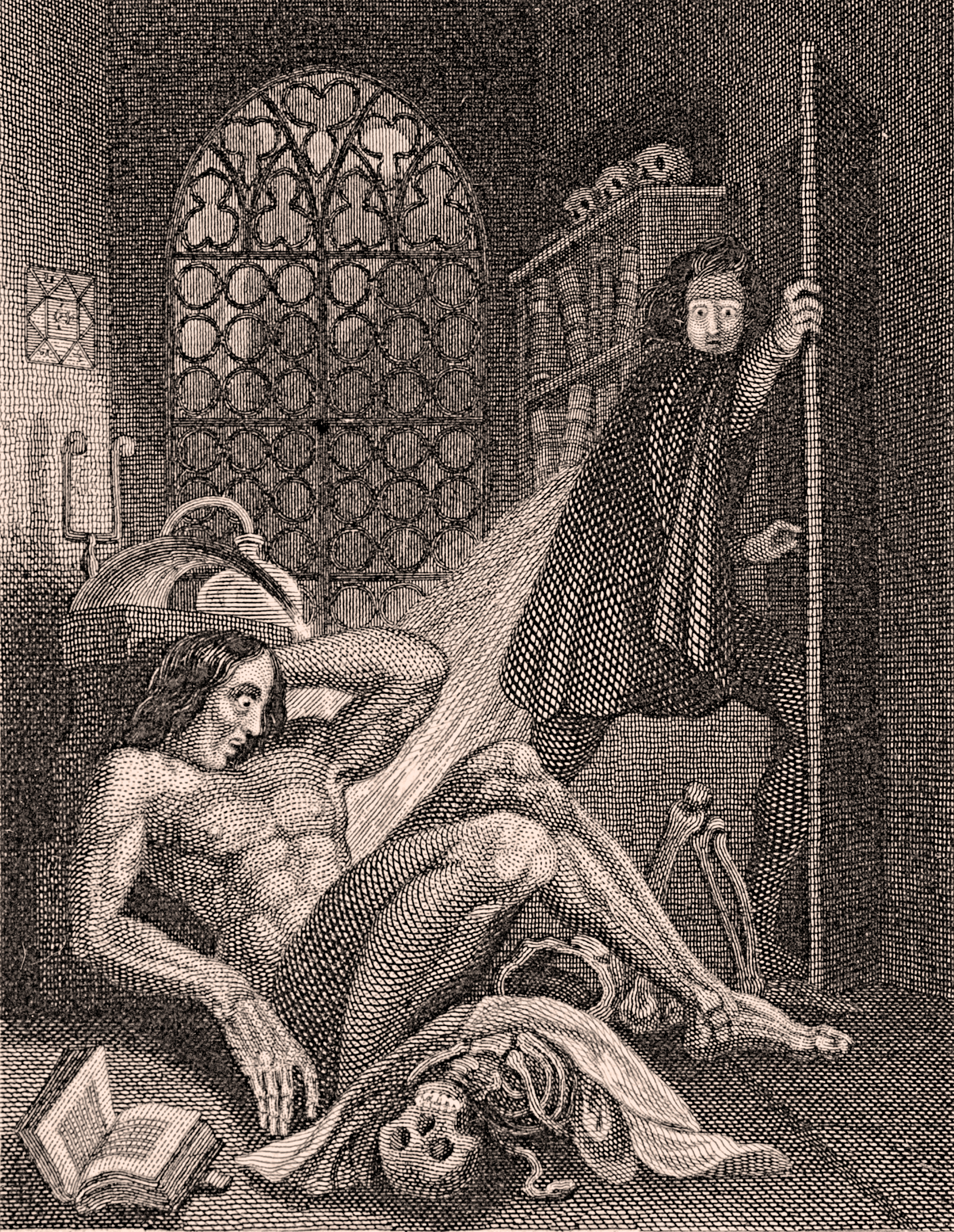
The frontispiece to the 1831 Frankenstein by Theodor von Holst, one of the first two illustrations for the novel

Mary Shelley believed in the Enlightenment idea that people could improve society through the responsible exercise of political power, but she feared that the irresponsible exercise of power would lead to chaos. In practice, her works largely criticise the way 18th-century thinkers such as her parents believed such change could be brought about. The creature in Frankenstein, for example, reads books associated with radical ideals but the education he gains from them is ultimately useless. Shelley's works reveal her as less optimistic than Godwin and Wollstonecraft; she lacks faith in Godwin's theory that humanity could eventually be perfected.

As literary scholar Kari Lokke writes, The Last Man, more so than Frankenstein, "in its refusal to place humanity at the centre of the universe, its questioning of our privileged position in relation to nature ... constitutes a profound and prophetic challenge to Western humanism." Specifically, Mary Shelley's allusions to what radicals believed was a failed revolution in France and the Godwinian, Wollstonecraftian, and Burkean responses to it, challenge "Enlightenment faith in the inevitability of progress through collective efforts". As in Frankenstein, Shelley "offers a profoundly disenchanted commentary on the age of revolution, which ends in a total rejection of the progressive ideals of her own generation". Not only does she reject these Enlightenment political ideals, but she also rejects the Romantic notion that the poetic or literary imagination can offer an alternative.

==== Politics ====
There is a new scholarly emphasis on Shelley as a lifelong reformer, deeply engaged in the liberal and feminist concerns of her day. In 1820, she was thrilled by the Liberal uprising in Spain which forced the king to grant a constitution. In 1823, she wrote articles for Leigh Hunt's periodical The Liberal and played an active role in the formulation of its outlook. She was delighted when the Whigs came back to power in 1830 and at the prospect of the Reform Act 1832 (2 & 3 Will. 4. c. 45).

Critics have until recently cited Lodore and Falkner as evidence of increasing conservatism in Mary Shelley's later works. In 1984, Mary Poovey influentially identified the retreat of Mary Shelley's reformist politics into the "separate sphere" of the domestic. Poovey suggested that Mary Shelley wrote Falkner to resolve her conflicted response to her father's combination of libertarian radicalism and stern insistence on social decorum. Mellor largely agreed, arguing that "Mary Shelley grounded her alternative political ideology on the metaphor of the peaceful, loving, bourgeois family. She thereby implicitly endorsed a conservative vision of gradual evolutionary reform." This vision allowed women to participate in the public sphere but it inherited the inequalities inherent in the bourgeois family.

However, in the last decade or so this view has been challenged. For example, Bennett claims that Mary Shelley's works reveal a consistent commitment to Romantic idealism and political reform and Jane Blumberg's study of Shelley's early novels argues that her career cannot be easily divided into radical and conservative halves. She contends that "Shelley was never a passionate radical like her husband and her later lifestyle was not abruptly assumed nor was it a betrayal. She was in fact challenging the political and literary influences of her circle in her first work." In this reading, Shelley's early works are interpreted as a challenge to Godwin and Percy Bysshe Shelley's radicalism. Victor Frankenstein's "thoughtless rejection of family", for example, is seen as evidence of Shelley's constant concern for the domestic.

=== Short stories ===
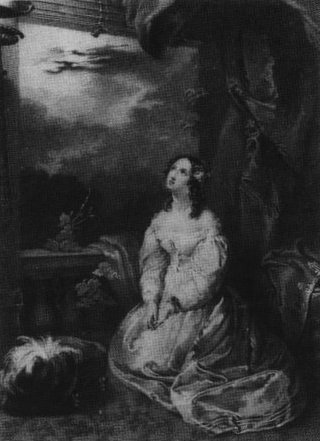
Shelley frequently wrote stories to accompany prepared illustrations for gift books, such as this one, which accompanied "Transformation" in the 1830 The Keepsake.

In the 1820s and 1830s, Mary Shelley frequently wrote short stories for gift books or annuals, including sixteen for The Keepsake, which was aimed at middle-class women and bound in silk, with gilt-edged pages. Mary Shelley's work in this genre has been described as that of a "hack writer" and "wordy and pedestrian". However, critic Charlotte Sussman points out that other leading writers of the day, such as the Romantic poets William Wordsworth and Samuel Taylor Coleridge, also took advantage of this profitable market. She explains that "the annuals were a major mode of literary production in the 1820s and 1830s", with The Keepsake the most successful.

Many of Shelley's stories are set in places or times far removed from early 19th-century Britain, such as Greece and the reign of Henry IV of France. Shelley was particularly interested in "the fragility of individual identity" and often depicted "the way a person's role in the world can be cataclysmically altered either by an internal emotional upheaval, or by some supernatural occurrence that mirrors an internal schism". In her stories, female identity is tied to a woman's short-lived value in the marriage market while male identity can be sustained and transformed through the use of money. Although Mary Shelley wrote twenty-one short stories for the annuals between 1823 and 1839, she always saw herself, above all, as a novelist. She wrote to Leigh Hunt, "I write bad articles which help to make me miserable—but I am going to plunge into a novel and hope that its clear water will wash off the mud of the magazines."

=== Travelogues ===
When they ran off to France in the summer of 1814, Mary Godwin and Percy Shelley began a joint journal, which they published in 1817 under the title History of a Six Weeks' Tour, adding four letters, two by each of them, based on their visit to Geneva in 1816, along with Percy Shelley's poem "Mont Blanc". The work celebrates youthful love and political idealism and consciously follows the example of Mary Wollstonecraft and others who had combined travelling with writing. The perspective of the History is philosophical and reformist rather than that of a conventional travelogue; in particular, it addresses the effects of politics and war on France. The letters the couple wrote on the second journey confront the "great and extraordinary events" of the final defeat of Napoleon at Waterloo after his "Hundred Days" return in 1815. They also explore the sublimity of Lake Geneva and Mont Blanc as well as the revolutionary legacy of the philosopher and novelist Jean-Jacques Rousseau.

Mary Shelley's last full-length book, written in the form of letters and published in 1844, was Rambles in Germany and Italy in 1840, 1842 and 1843, which recorded her travels with her son Percy Florence and his university friends. In Rambles, Shelley follows the tradition of Mary Wollstonecraft's Letters Written in Sweden, Norway, and Denmark and her own A History of a Six Weeks' Tour in mapping her personal and political landscape through the discourse of sensibility and sympathy. For Shelley, building sympathetic connections between people is the way to build civil society and to increase knowledge: "knowledge, to enlighten and free the mind from clinging deadening prejudices—a wider circle of sympathy with our fellow-creatures;—these are the uses of travel". Between observations on scenery, culture, and "the people, especially in a political point of view", she uses the travelogue form to explore her roles as a widow and mother and to reflect on revolutionary nationalism in Italy. (Note: Mary Shelley donated the £60 fee for Rambles to the exiled Italian revolutionary Ferdinand Gatteschi, whose essay on the Carbonari rebels she included in the book. (Orr, "Mary Shelley's Rambles ")) She also records her "pilgrimage" to scenes associated with Percy Shelley. According to critic Clarissa Orr, Mary Shelley's adoption of a persona of philosophical motherhood gives Rambles the unity of a prose poem, with "death and memory as central themes". At the same time, Shelley makes an egalitarian case against monarchy, class distinctions, slavery, and war.

=== Biographies ===
Between 1832 and 1839, Mary Shelley wrote many biographies of notable Italian, Spanish, Portuguese, and French men and a few women for Dionysius Lardner's Lives of the Most Eminent Literary and Scientific Men. These formed part of Lardner's Cabinet Cyclopaedia, one of the best of many such series produced in the 1820s and 1830s in response to growing middle-class demand for self-education. Until the republication of these essays in 2002, their significance within her body of work was not appreciated. (Note: However, "precise attribution of all the biographical essays" in these volumes "is very difficult", according to Kucich.) In the view of literary scholar Greg Kucich, they reveal Mary Shelley's "prodigious research across several centuries and in multiple languages", her gift for biographical narrative, and her interest in the "emerging forms of feminist historiography". Shelley wrote in a biographical style popularised by the 18th-century critic Samuel Johnson in his Lives of the Poets (1779–1781), combining secondary sources, memoir and anecdote, and authorial evaluation. She records details of each writer's life and character, quotes their writing in the original as well as in translation, and ends with a critical assessment of their achievement.

For Shelley, biographical writing was supposed to, in her words, "form as it were a school in which to study the philosophy of history", and to teach "lessons". Most frequently and importantly, these lessons consisted of criticisms of male-dominated institutions such as primogeniture. Shelley emphasises domesticity, romance, family, sympathy, and compassion in the lives of her subjects. Her conviction that such forces could improve society connects her biographical approach with that of other early feminist historians such as Mary Hays and Anna Jameson. Unlike her novels, most of which had an original print run of several hundred copies, the Lives had a print run of about 4,000 for each volume: thus, according to Kucich, Mary Shelley's "use of biography to forward the social agenda of women's historiography became one of her most influential political interventions".

=== Editorial work ===
"The qualities that struck anyone newly introduced to Shelley, were, first, a gentle and cordial goodness that animated his intercourse with warm affection, and helpful sympathy. The other, the eagerness and ardour with which he was attached to the cause of human happiness and improvement."

— Mary Shelley, "Preface", Poetical Works of Percy Bysshe Shelley

Soon after Percy Shelley's death, Mary Shelley determined to write his biography. In a letter of 17 November 1822, she announced: "I shall write his life—& thus occupy myself in the only manner from which I can derive consolation." However, her father-in-law, Sir Timothy Shelley, effectively banned her from doing so. (Note: Sir Timothy Shelley made his allowance to Mary (on behalf of Percy Florence) dependent on her not putting the Shelley name in print.) Mary began her fostering of Percy's poetic reputation in 1824 with the publication of his Posthumous Poems. In 1839, while she was working on the Lives, she prepared a new edition of his poetry, which became, in the words of literary scholar Susan J. Wolfson, "the canonizing event" in the history of her husband's reputation. The following year, Mary Shelley edited a volume of her husband's essays, letters, translations, and fragments, and throughout the 1830s, she introduced his poetry to a wider audience by publishing assorted works in the annual The Keepsake.

Evading Sir Timothy's ban on a biography, Mary Shelley often included in these editions her own annotations and reflections on her husband's life and work. "I am to justify his ways," she had declared in 1824; "I am to make him beloved to all posterity." It was this goal, argues Blumberg, that led her to present Percy's work to the public in the "most popular form possible". To tailor his works for a Victorian audience, she cast Percy Shelley as a lyrical rather than a political poet. As Mary Favret writes, "the disembodied Percy identifies the spirit of poetry itself". Mary glossed Percy's political radicalism as a form of sentimentalism, arguing that his republicanism arose from sympathy for those who were suffering. She inserted romantic anecdotes of his benevolence, domesticity, and love of the natural world. Portraying herself as Percy's "practical muse", she also noted how she had suggested revisions as he wrote.

Despite the emotions stirred by this task, Mary Shelley arguably proved herself in many respects a professional and scholarly editor. Working from Percy's messy, sometimes indecipherable, notebooks, she attempted to form a chronology for his writings, and she included poems, such as Epipsychidion, addressed to Emilia Viviani, which she would rather have left out. She was forced, however, into several compromises, and, as Blumberg notes, "modern critics have found fault with the edition and claim variously that she miscopied, misinterpreted, purposely obscured, and attempted to turn the poet into something he was not". According to Wolfson, Donald Reiman, a modern editor of Percy Bysshe Shelley's works, still refers to Mary Shelley's editions, while acknowledging that her editing style belongs "to an age of editing when the aim was not to establish accurate texts and scholarly apparatus but to present a full record of a writer's career for the general reader". In principle, Mary Shelley believed in publishing every last word of her husband's work; but she found herself obliged to omit certain passages, either by pressure from her publisher, Edward Moxon, or in deference to public propriety. For example, she removed the atheistic passages from Queen Mab for the first edition. After she restored them in the second edition, Moxon was prosecuted and convicted of blasphemous libel, though the prosecution was brought out of principle by the Chartist publisher Henry Hetherington, and no punishment was sought. Mary Shelley's omissions provoked criticism, often stinging, from members of Percy Shelley's former circle, and reviewers accused her of, among other things, indiscriminate inclusions. Her notes have nevertheless remained an essential source for the study of Percy Shelley's work. As Bennett explains, "biographers and critics agree that Mary Shelley's commitment to bring Shelley the notice she believed his works merited was the single, major force that established Shelley's reputation during a period when he almost certainly would have faded from public view".

== Reputation ==
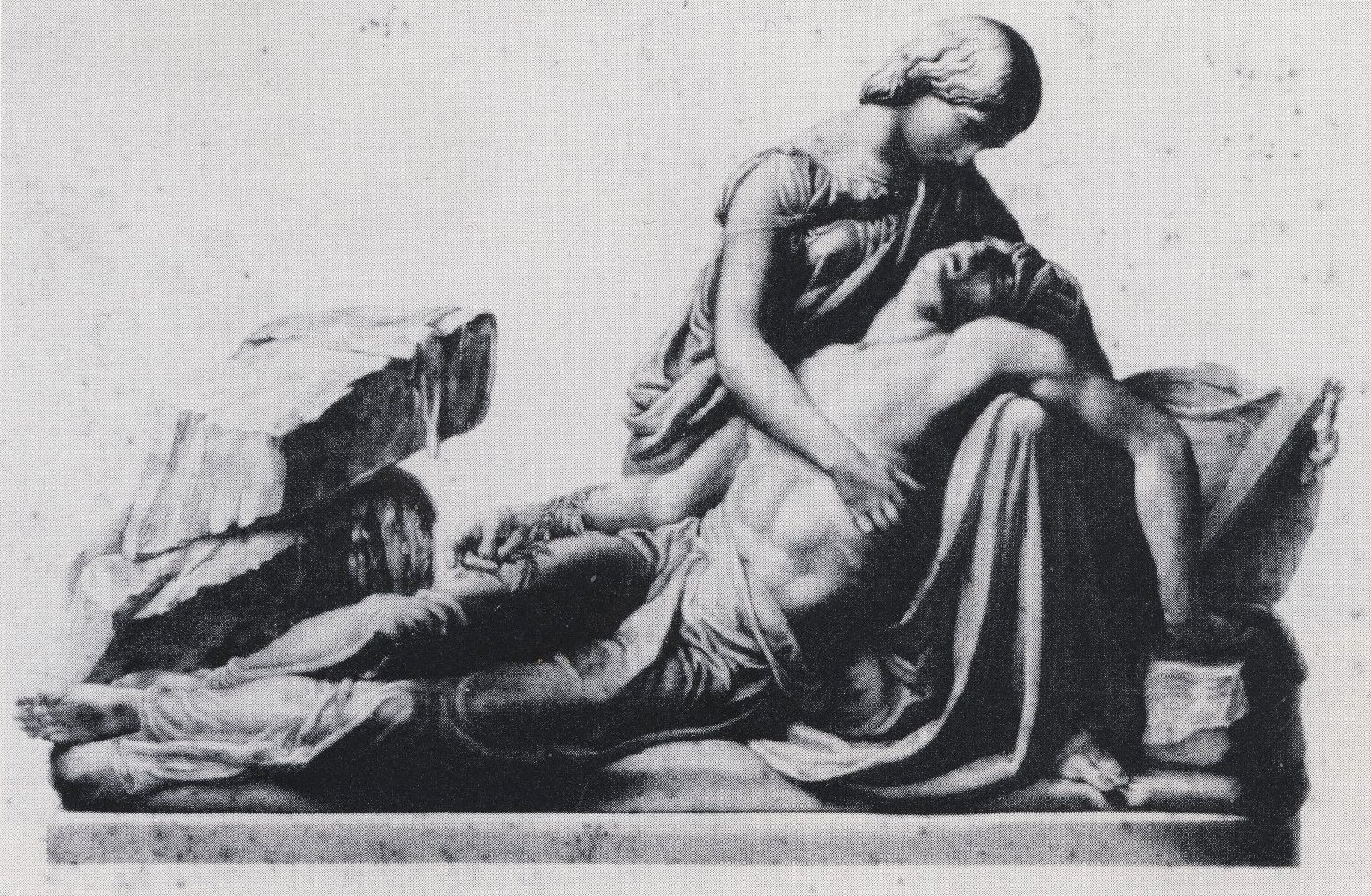
Engraving by George Stodart after a monument of Mary and Percy Shelley by Henry Weekes (1853)

In her own lifetime Mary Shelley was taken seriously as a writer, though reviewers often missed her writings' political edge. After her death, however, she was chiefly remembered as the wife of Percy Bysshe Shelley and as the author of Frankenstein. In fact, in the introduction to her letters published in 1945, editor Frederick Jones wrote, "a collection of the present size could not be justified by the general quality of the letters or by Mary Shelley's importance as a writer. It is as the wife of [Percy Bysshe Shelley] that she excites our interest." This attitude had not disappeared by 1980 when Betty T. Bennett published the first volume of Mary Shelley's complete letters. As she explains, "the fact is that until recent years scholars have generally regarded Mary Wollstonecraft Shelley as a result: William Godwin's and Mary Wollstonecraft's daughter who became Shelley's Pygmalion." It was not until Emily Sunstein's Mary Shelley: Romance and Reality in 1989 that a full-length scholarly biography was published.

The attempts of Mary Shelley's son and daughter-in-law to "Victorianise" her memory by censoring biographical documents contributed to a perception of Mary Shelley as a more conventional, less reformist figure than her works suggest. Her own timid omissions from Percy Shelley's works and her quiet avoidance of public controversy in her later years added to this impression. Commentary by Hogg, Trelawny, and other admirers of Percy Shelley also tended to downplay Mary Shelley's radicalism. Trelawny's Records of Shelley, Byron, and the Author (1878) praised Percy Shelley at the expense of Mary, questioning her intelligence and even her authorship of Frankenstein. Lady Shelley, Percy Florence's wife, responded in part by presenting a severely edited collection of letters she had inherited, published privately as Shelley and Mary in 1882.

From Frankenstein's first theatrical adaptation in 1823 to the cinematic adaptations of the 20th century, including the first cinematic version in 1910 and now-famous versions such as James Whale's 1931 Frankenstein, the seven films in the Hammer Horror series beginning with The Curse of Frankenstein (1957), Mel Brooks' satirical 1974 Young Frankenstein, and Kenneth Branagh's 1994 Mary Shelley's Frankenstein, many audiences first encounter the work of Mary Shelley through adaptation. Over the course of the 19th century, Mary Shelley came to be seen as a one-novel author at best, rather than as the professional writer she was; most of her works remained out of print until the 1980s, obstructing a larger view of her achievement. The republication of almost all her writing since the 1980s has stimulated a new recognition of its value, and she is now viewed as one of the most versatile and significant literary figures from the 19th century. Her habit of intensive reading and study, revealed in her journals and letters and reflected in her works, is now better appreciated. Shelley's conception of herself as an author has also been recognised; after Percy's death, she wrote of her authorial ambitions: "I think that I can maintain myself, and there is something inspiriting in the idea." Scholars now consider Mary Shelley to be a major Romantic figure, significant for her literary achievement and her political voice as a woman and a liberal.

== Selected works ==
- History of a Six Weeks' Tour (1817)
- Frankenstein; or, The Modern Prometheus (1818)
- Mathilda (1819)
- Valperga; or, The Life and Adventures of Castruccio, Prince of Lucca (1823)
- Posthumous Poems of Percy Bysshe Shelley (1824)
- The Last Man (1826)
- The Fortunes of Perkin Warbeck (1830)
- Lodore (1835)
- Falkner (1837)
- The Poetical Works of Percy Bysshe Shelley (1839)
- Contributions to Lives of the Most Eminent Literary and Scientific Men (1835–39), part of Dionysius Lardner's Cabinet Cyclopaedia
- Rambles in Germany and Italy in 1840, 1842, and 1843 (1844)

Collections of Mary Shelley's papers are housed in Lord Abinger's Shelley Collection on deposit at the Bodleian Library, the New York Public Library (particularly The Carl H. Pforzheimer Collection of Shelley and His Circle), the Huntington Library, the British Library, and in The John Murray Archive.

== See also ==
- Godwin–Shelley family tree
- Map of 1814 and 1816 European journeys
- Map of 1840s European journeys
- Mary Shelley – 2017 period-drama film
- Yours, Creature – 2023 poetry collection by Jessica Cuello

== Bibliography ==
=== Primary sources ===
- Shelley, Mary. Collected Tales and Stories. Ed. Charles E. Robinson. Baltimore, MD: Johns Hopkins University Press, 1976. ISBN 0-8018-1706-4.
- Shelley, Mary. Frankenstein; or, The Modern Prometheus. Ed. Susan J. Wolfson. New York: Pearson Longman, 2007. ISBN 0-321-39953-6.
- Shelley, Mary. The Journals of Mary Shelley, 1814–44. Ed. Paula R. Feldman and Diana Scott-Kilvert. Baltimore, MD: Johns Hopkins University Press, 1995. ISBN 0-8018-5088-6.
- Shelley, Mary. The Last Man. Ed. Morton D. Paley. Oxford: Oxford Paperbacks, 1998. ISBN 0-19-283865-2.
- Shelley, Mary. Lodore. Ed. Lisa Vargo. Ontario: Broadview Press, 1997. ISBN 1-55111-077-6.
- Shelley, Mary. Mary Shelley's Literary Lives and Other Writings. 4 vols. Ed. Tilar J. Mazzeo. London: Pickering & Chatto, 2002. ISBN 1-85196-716-8.
- Shelley, Mary. Mathilda Archived 7 November 2015 at the Wayback Machine. Ed. Elizabeth Nitchie. Chapel Hill, NC: University of North Carolina Press, 1959. Project Gutenberg. Retrieved 16 February 2008.
- Shelley, Mary. Matilda; with Mary and Maria, by Mary Wollstonecraft. Ed. Janet Todd. London: Penguin, 1992. ISBN 0-14-043371-6.
- Shelley, Mary, ed. The Poetical Works of Percy Bysshe Shelley Archived 27 April 2016 at the Wayback Machine. London: Edward Moxon, 1840. Google Books. Retrieved 6 April 2008.
- Shelley, Mary. Selected Letters of Mary Wollstonecraft Shelley. Ed. Betty T. Bennett. Baltimore, MD: Johns Hopkins University Press, 1995. ISBN 0-8018-4886-5.
- Shelley, Mary. Valperga; or, The Life and Adventures of Castruccio, Prince of Lucca. Ed. Michael Rossington. Oxford: Oxford Paperbacks, 2000. ISBN 0-19-283289-1.
- Shelley, Percy Bysshe. Shelley's Poetry and Prose. Eds. Donald H. Reiman and Neil Fraistat. 2nd ed. New York: W. W. Norton and Co., 2002. ISBN 0-393-97752-8.

=== Secondary sources ===
- Bennett, Betty T. "Finding Mary Shelley in her Letters". Romantic Revisions. Ed. Robert Brinkley and Keith Hanley. Cambridge: Cambridge University Press, 1992. ISBN 0-521-38074-X.
- Bennett, Betty T., ed. Mary Shelley in her Times. Baltimore, MD: Johns Hopkins University Press, 2003. ISBN 0-8018-7733-4.
- Bennett, Betty T. Mary Wollstonecraft Shelley: An Introduction. Baltimore, MD: Johns Hopkins University Press, 1998. ISBN 0-8018-5976-X.
- Bennett, Betty T. "The Political Philosophy of Mary Shelley's Historical Novels: Valperga and Perkin Warbeck". The Evidence of the Imagination. Ed. Donald H. Reiman, Michael C. Jaye, and Betty T. Bennett. New York: New York University Press, 1978. ISBN 0-8147-7372-9.
- Bieri, James. Percy Bysshe Shelley, a Biography: Exile of Unfulfilled Renown, 1816–1822. Newark, DE: University of Delaware Press, 2005. ISBN 0-87413-893-0.
- Blumberg, Jane. Mary Shelley's Early Novels: "This Child of Imagination and Misery". Iowa City, IA: University of Iowa Press, 1993. ISBN 0-87745-397-7.
- Brewer, William D. (Spring 1999). "William Godwin, Chivalry, and Mary Shelley's The Fortunes of Perkin Warbeck". Papers on Language and Literature. 35 (2): 187–205.
- Bunnell, Charlene E. "All the World's a Stage": Dramatic Sensibility in Mary Shelley's Novels. New York: Routledge, 2002. ISBN 0-415-93863-5.
- Carlson, J.A. England's First Family of Writers: Mary Wollstonecraft, William Godwin, Mary Shelley. Baltimore, MD: Johns Hopkins University Press, 2007. ISBN 0-8018-8618-X.
- Clemit, Pamela. "From The Fields of Fancy to Matilda". Mary Shelley in her Times. Ed. Betty T. Bennett. Baltimore, MD: Johns Hopkins University Press, 2003. ISBN 0-8018-7733-4.
- Clemit, Pamela. The Godwinian Novel: The Rational Fictions of Godwin, Brockden Brown, Mary Shelley. Oxford: Clarendon Press, 1993. ISBN 0-19-811220-3.
- Conger, Syndy M., Frederick S. Frank, and Gregory O'Dea, eds. Iconoclastic Departures: Mary Shelley after "Frankenstein". Essays in Honor of the Bicentenary of Mary Shelley's Birth. Madison, NJ: Farleigh Dickinson University Press, 1997. ISBN 0-8386-3684-5.
- Eberle-Sinatra, Michael, ed. Mary Shelley's Fictions: From Frankenstein to Falkner. New York: St. Martin's Press/Palgrave, 2000. ISBN 0-333-77106-0.
- Fisch, Audrey A., Anne K. Mellor, and Esther H. Schorr, eds. The Other Mary Shelley: Beyond "Frankenstein". New York: Oxford University Press, 1993. ISBN 0-19-507740-7.
- Frank, Frederick S. "Mary Shelley's Other Fictions: A Bibliographic Consensus". Iconoclastic Departures: Mary Shelley after "Frankenstein". Essays in Honor of the Bicentenary of Mary Shelley's Birth. Ed. Syndy M. Conger, Frederick S. Frank, and Gregory O'Dea. Madison, NJ: Farleigh Dickinson University Press, 1997. ISBN 0-8386-3684-5.
- Garrett, Martin. Mary Shelley. Oxford: Oxford University Press, 2002. ISBN 0195217896
- Gilbert, Sandra M. and Susan Gubar. The Madwoman in the Attic: The Woman Writer and the Nineteenth-Century Literary Imagination. 1979. New Haven: Yale University Press, 1984. ISBN 0-300-02596-3.
- Gittings, Robert and Jo Manton. Claire Clairmont and the Shelleys. Oxford: Oxford University Press, 1992. ISBN 0-19-818594-4.
- Holmes, Richard. Shelley: The Pursuit. 1974. London: Harper Perennial, 2003. ISBN 0-00-720458-2.
- Jones, Steven. "Charles E. Robinson, Ed. The Frankenstein Notebooks: A Facsimile Edition of Mary Shelley's Novel, 1816–17 (Parts One and Two)". (Book Review). Romantic Circles website, 1 January 1998. Retrieved 15 September 2016.
- Jump, Harriet Devine, Pamela Clemit, and Betty T. Bennett, eds. Lives of the Great Romantics III: Godwin, Wollstonecraft & Mary Shelley by Their Contemporaries. London: Pickering & Chatto, 1999. ISBN 1-85196-512-2.
- Levine, George, and U. C. Knoepflmacher, eds. The Endurance of Frankenstein: Essays on Mary Shelley's novel. Berkeley, CA: University of California Press, 1979. ISBN 0-520-03612-3.
- Mellor, Anne K. Mary Shelley: Her Life, her Fiction, Her Monsters. London: Routledge, 1990. ISBN 0-415-90147-2.
- Myers, Mitzi. "Mary Wollstonecraft Godwin Shelley: The Female Author between Public and Private Spheres". Mary Shelley in her Times. Ed. Betty T. Bennett. Baltimore, MD: Johns Hopkins University Press, 2003. ISBN 0-8018-7733-4.
- Norman, Sylva (1953). "Shelley's Last Residence". Keats–Shelley Journal. 2 (Jan). Keats–Shelley Association of America: 1–10. JSTOR 30212475.
- Orr, Clarissa Campbell. "Mary Shelley's Rambles in Germany and Italy, the Celebrity Author, and the Undiscovered Country of the Human Heart". Romanticism on the Net 11 (August 1998). Retrieved 22 February 2008.
- Poovey, Mary. The Proper Lady and the Woman Writer: Ideology as Style in the Works of Mary Wollstonecraft, Mary Shelley and Jane Austen. Chicago: University of Chicago Press, 1985. ISBN 0-226-67528-9.
- Robinson, Charles E., ed. The Frankenstein Notebooks: A Facsimile Edition of Mary Shelley's Novel, 1816–17 (Parts One and Two). The Manuscripts of the Younger Romantics, Volume IX, Donald H. Reiman, general ed. Garland Publishing, 1996. ISBN 0-8153-1608-9.
- Schor, Esther, ed. The Cambridge Companion to Mary Shelley. Cambridge: Cambridge University Press, 2003. ISBN 0-521-00770-4.
- Seymour, Miranda. Mary Shelley. London: John Murray, 2000. ISBN 0-7195-5711-9.
- Sites, Melissa. "Re/membering Home: Utopian Domesticity in Mary Shelley's Lodore". A Brighter Morn: The Shelley Circle's Utopian Project. Ed. Darby Lewes. Lanham, MD: Lexington Books, 2003. ISBN 0-7391-0472-1.
- Smith, Johanna M. "A Critical History of Frankenstein". Frankenstein. Case Studies in Contemporary Criticism. New York: Palgrave Macmillan, 2000. ISBN 0-312-22762-0.
- Spark, Muriel. Mary Shelley. London: Cardinal, 1987. ISBN 0-7474-0318-X.
- St Clair, William. The Godwins and the Shelleys: The Biography of a Family. London: Faber & Faber, 1989. ISBN 0-571-15422-0.
- Sterrenburg, Lee. "The Last Man: Anatomy of Failed Revolutions". Nineteenth Century Fiction 33 (1978): 324–347.
- Sunstein, Emily W. Mary Shelley: Romance and Reality. 1989. Baltimore, MD: Johns Hopkins University Press, 1991. ISBN 0-8018-4218-2.
- Townsend, William C. Modern State Trials. London: Longman, Brown, Green, and Longmans, 1850.
- Wake, Ann M Frank. "Women in the Active Voice: Recovering Female History in Mary Shelley's Valperga and Perkin Warbeck". Iconoclastic Departures: Mary Shelley after "Frankenstein". Essays in Honor of the Bicentenary of Mary Shelley's Birth. Ed. Syndy M. Conger, Frederick S. Frank, and Gregory O'Dea. Madison, NJ: Farleigh Dickinson University Press, 1997. ISBN 0-8386-3684-5.
- White, Daniel E. "'The god undeified': Mary Shelley's Valperga, Italy, and the Aesthetic of Desire Archived 31 March 2008 at the Wayback Machine". Romanticism on the Net 6 (May 1997). Retrieved 22 February 2008.
