= Emily W. Sunstein =

American campaigner, political activist and biographer (1924–2007)

Emily Sunstein
- Born: Emily Weisberg; April 28, 1924; Dallas
- Died: April 21, 2007 (aged 82); Philadelphia, Pennsylvania
- Education: AB, Vassar College
- Spouse: Leon Sunstein Jr.

Emily Weisberg Sunstein (April 28, 1924 – April 21, 2007) was an American campaigner, political activist and biographer.

== Biography ==
Born Emily Weisberg in Dallas, Texas, and graduated from high school there. She married stockbroker Leon Sunstein, Jr. in 1943 a year before earning a bachelor's degree in Art History in 1944 from Vassar College. The couple then moved to Elkins Park before raising three children in Wyncote.

Before beginning her writing career, Sunstein was active in civic affairs. A charter member of Americans for Democratic Action (founded in 1947), she later became the first woman to serve as head of the Philadelphia chapter of the American Jewish Committee.

She sat on the State Commission for Human Relations from 1970 to 1974, was the head of the state Conference on Women's Economics Issues and the head of the Philadelphia YWCA in 1975.

She and her husband built a sprawling modern cedar home overlooking Fairmount Park in the mid-1970s.

Her first book, A different face: The life of Mary Wollstonecraft (Harper & Row Co., 1975) was published in 1975. In 1989, her second book, Mary Shelley: Romance and Reality (Little, Brown and Co., 1989) was published to critical acclaim. She won the Modern Language Association Prize for Independent Scholars in 1989.

She moved away from politics and started to enjoy other passions such as writing, collecting art, entertaining and horticulture. She remained active in Jewish causes until she became ill in the mid-1990s.

== Writings ==
- Mary Shelley : Romance and Reality - 1991 - 514 pages
- A Different Face: The Life of Mary Wollstonecraft. New York: Harper and Row, 1975. ISBN 0-06-014201-4.
