= Betty T. Bennett =

American literary scholar (1935–2006)

Betty T. Bennett (1935–2006) was Distinguished Professor of Literature and Dean of the College of Arts and Sciences (1985–1997) at American University. She was previously Dean of the School of Liberal Arts and Sciences and acting provost of Pratt Institute from 1979 to 1985. Among her numerous awards and honors, Bennett was a fellow of the National Endowment for the Humanities and fellow of American Council of Learned Societies. She won the Keats-Shelley Association of America - Distinguished Scholar Award in 1992 and was Founding President, Phi Beta Kappa, Zeta Chapter at American University. Born in Brooklyn, New York, Bennett graduated from Brooklyn College magna cum laude and later received a master's degree (1962) and PhD (1970) in English and American literature from New York University.

Bennett was an internationally known scholar on the life of Frankenstein author Mary Wollstonecraft Shelley and her circle of friends. She is best known for her three-volume The Letters of Mary Wollstonecraft Shelley, which she edited and published from 1980 to 1988. In a 1988 review of Dr. Bennett's final volume of the letters, author Brian Aldiss declared her work "a great contribution to scholarship, and one that never need be done again." The books contain nearly 1,300 letters, some 500 of which were previously unpublished. For several years before her death, Bennett worked on a much anticipated literary biography of Shelley, which is scheduled to be released by Harvard University Press.

== Major publications ==
As author:

- British War Poetry in the Age of Romanticism, 1793-1815 (1976)
- The Evidence of the Imagination: Studies of Interactions Between Life and Art in English Romantic Literature (1978)
- Mary Diana Dods, a Gentleman and a Scholar (1991)
- Shelley: Poet and Legislator of the World (1996)
- Mary Wollstonecraft Shelley: An Introduction (1998)
- Mary Shelley in Her Times (2000)

As editor or co-editor:

- The Letters of Mary Wollstonecraft Shelley (1980–88)
- The Mary Shelley Reader (1990)
- Mythological Dramas: Proserpine and Midas (1992) (works by Mary Shelley)
- Selected Letters of Mary Wollstonecraft Shelley (1995)
- Lives of the Great Romantics, Volume 3, Godwin, Wollstonecraft, and Mary Shelley by Their Contemporaries (1999) (editor)
