= List of 18th-century British periodicals =

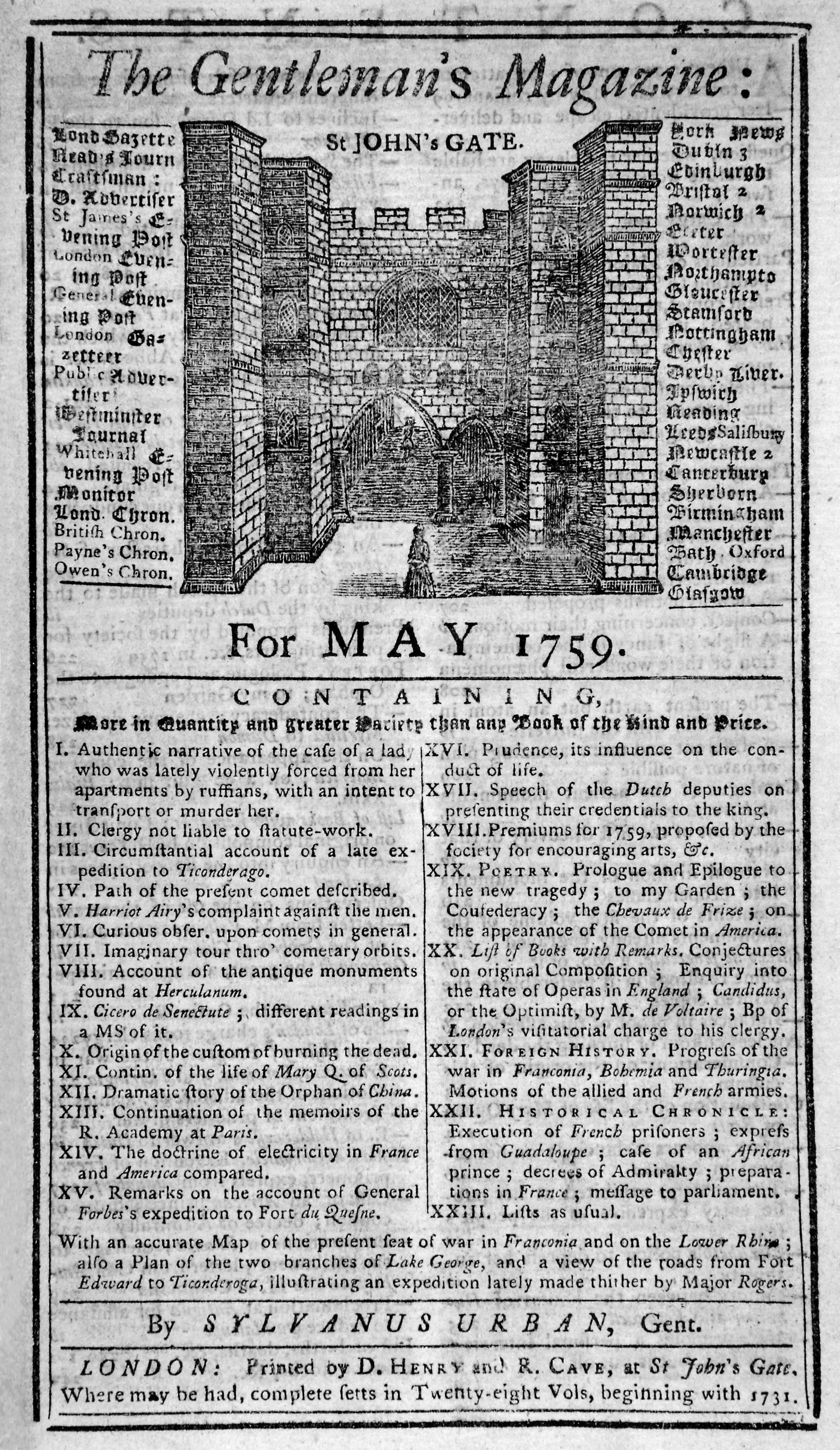
Front page of The Gentleman's Magazine, May 1759

This list of 18th-century British periodicals excludes daily newspapers.

== In order of first publication ==
- The Tatler (1709–1711)
- The Female Tatler (8 July 1709–31 March 1710). Thrice weekly; 115 issues
- The Spectator (1711–1714). Founded by Joseph Addison and Richard Steele; published daily, 1711–1712; in 1714, three times a week for six months. Collected in book form it remained hugely popular for the rest of the century.
- Vetusta Monumenta (1718–1906). Illustrated antiquarian papers published at intermittent intervals by the Society of Antiquaries of London.
- The Intelligencer (1728–1729). Launched by Jonathan Swift and Thomas Sheridan
- The Plain Dealer (1724–1725). Bi-weekly. Founded by Aaron Hill.
- The Weekly Register (1729–1735). Anti-ministerial periodical featuring essays by James Ralph.
- The Grub Street Journal (1730–738). Journal inspired by Alexander Pope's Dunciad
- The Gentleman's Magazine (1731–1907). Monthly.
- The London Magazine (1732–1785)
- The Bee (1733–1735). Founded by Eustace Budgell.
- The Prompter (1734–1736). A theatrical and literary periodical chiefly associated with Aaron Hill and William Popple.
- Lloyd's List (1734–). Weekly, then semi-weekly.
- The Champion (1737–1744). Political weekly co-edited by Henry Fielding and James Ralph.
- The Scots Magazine (1739–1826).
- Birmingham Gazette (1741–1862). Weekly.
- Old England (1743). Short-lived political journal funded by Dodington and Chesterfield, edited by James Ralph.
- The Female Spectator (1744–1746). Monthly; 24 issues
- The Remembrancer (1747–1751). Opposition weekly aligned with Prince Frederick and managed by James Ralph.
- The Universal Magazine of Knowledge and Pleasure (1747–1814). Monthly. Editors included James Hinton, W. Bent, and Percival Stockdale.
- The Monthly Review (1749–1845). Monthly. Founded by Ralph Griffiths and Robert Dodsley. Oliver Goldsmith was a contributor.
- The Rambler (1750–1752). Twice weekly.
- The Protester (2 June–10 November 1753). Weekly political paper, Bedford-Whig alignment; edited by James Ralph under the pseudonym “Issachar Barebone”.
- The Adventurer (1752–1754). Twice weekly. Founded by John Hawkesworth, Samuel Johnson, and others.
- The World (1753–1756). Every Thursday. Founded by "Adam Fitz-Adam" (i.e. Edwin Moore) and published by the Dodsleys.
- The Connoisseur (1754–1756). Weekly.
- The Critical Review (1756–1817)
- The London Chronicle (1756–1823). Thrice weekly.
- The Annual Register (1758–). Annually.
- Universal Chronicle, which published Samuel Johnson'sThe Idler (1758–1760)
- The Bee (1759–1759)
- The Lady's Museum (1760–1761): monthly
- Exeter Mercury or West Country Advertiser, later Trewman's Exeter Flying Post (1763–1917)
- The Gospel Magazine (1766–)
- Theological Repository (1769–1771, 1784, 1786, 1788)
- Town and Country Magazine (1769–)
- The Lady's Magazine (1770–1837). Monthly.
- The Building Magazine (1774–1778)
- Wesleyan Methodist Magazine (1778–1969). Monthly
- The Arminian Magazine (1778–1913)
- The European Magazine, and London Review (1782–1826). Founded by James Perry; later edited by Isaac Reed.
- A New Review (1782–1786). Edited by Paul Henry Maty.
- Annals of Agriculture (1784–1815). Started by Arthur Young.
- The New Town & Country Magazine (1787–1789)
- The Analytical Review (1788–1799)
- The Botanical Magazine, subsequently Curtis's Botanical Magazine (1787–)
- The Observer (1791–). Weekly.
- The Sporting Magazine. (1792–). Monthly.
- British Critic. Quarterly (1793–1826)
- Anthologia hibernica (1793–1794). Published in Dublin.
- The Monthly Mirror (1795–1811). Founded by Thomas Bellamy.
- The Tribune (1795–1796). Edited by John Thelwall
- The Aberdeen Magazine, Or, Universal Repository. (1796–1798)
- The Monthly Magazine (1796–1825). Founded by Sir Richard Phillips, edited by John Aikin
- The Watchman (1796). Founded and edited by Samuel Taylor Coleridge
- Bell's Weekly Messenger (1796–1832). Weekly.
- The Anti-Jacobin, or, Weekly Examiner (1797–1798)
- The Anti-Jacobin Review (1798–1821)
- The Philosophical Magazine (1798–)
- The Asiatic annual register (1799–1811)
- Conjuror's Magazine (1791–1794?)
- The Lady's Monthly Museum (1798–1832)

== In alphabetical order ==
- The Aberdeen Magazine, Or, Universal Repository. (1796–1798)
- The Adventurer (1752–1754). Twice weekly. Founded by John Hawkesworth, Samuel Johnson, and others.
- The Analytical Review (1788–1799)
- Annals of Agriculture (1784–1815). Started by Arthur Young.
- The Annual Register (1758–). Annually.
- Anthologia hibernica (1793–1794). Published in Dublin.
- The Anti-Jacobin Review (1798–1821)
- The Anti-Jacobin, or, Weekly Examiner (1797–1798)
- The Arminian Magazine (1778–1913)
- The Asiatic annual register (1799–1811)
- The Bee (1733–1735). Founded by Eustace Budgell.
- The Bee (1759–1759)
- Bell's Weekly Messenger (1796–1832)
- Birmingham Gazette (1741–1862)
- The Botanical Magazine, subsequently Curtis's Botanical Magazine (1787–)
- British Critic. Quarterly (1793–1826)
- The Building Magazine (1774–1778)
- The Champion (1737–1744). Political weekly co-edited by Henry Fielding and James Ralph.
- Conjuror's Magazine (1791–1794?)
- The Connoisseur (1754–1756). Weekly.
- The Critical Review (1756–1817)
- The European Magazine, and London Review (1782–1826). Founded by James Perry; later edited by Isaac Reed.
- Exeter Mercury or West Country Advertiser, later Trewman's Exeter Flying Post (1763–1917)
- The Female Spectator (1744—1746). Monthly; 24 issues
- The Female Tatler (8 July 1709–31 March 1710). Thrice weekly; 115 issues
- The Grub Street Journal (1730–1738). Journal inspired by Alexander Pope's Dunciad
- The Intelligencer (1728–1729). Launched by Jonathan Swift and Thomas Sheridan
- The Lady's Magazine (1770–1837). Monthly.
- The Lady's Monthly Museum (1798–1832)
- The Lady's Museum (1760–1761): monthly
- Lloyd's List (1734–). Weekly, then semi-weekly.
- The London Chronicle (1756–1823). Thrice weekly.
- The London Magazine (1732–1785)
- The Monthly Magazine (1796–1825). Founded by Sir Richard Phillips, edited by John Aikin
- The Monthly Mirror (1795–1811). Founded by Thomas Bellamy.
- The Monthly Review (1749–1845). Monthly. Founded by Ralph Griffiths and Robert Dodsley. Oliver Goldsmith was a contributor.
- A New Review (1782–1786). Edited by Paul Henry Maty.
- The New Town & Country Magazine (1787–1789)
- The Observer (1791–). Weekly.
- Old England (1743). Short-lived political journal funded by Dodington and Chesterfield, edited by James Ralph.
- The Philosophical Magazine (1798–)
- The Plain Dealer (1724–1725). Bi-weekly. Founded by Aaron Hill.
- The Prompter (1734–1736). A theatrical and literary periodical chiefly associated with Aaron Hill and William Popple.
- The Protester (2 June–10 November 1753). Weekly political paper, Bedford-Whig alignment; edited by James Ralph under the pseudonym “Issachar Barebone”.
- The Rambler (1750–1752). Twice weekly.
- The Remembrancer (1747–1751). Opposition weekly aligned with Prince Frederick and managed by James Ralph.
- The Scots Magazine (1739–1826).
- The Sporting Magazine. (1792–). Monthly.
- The Spectator (1711–1714). Founded by Joseph Addison and Richard Steele; published daily, 1711–1712; in 1714, three times a week for six months. Collected in book form it remained hugely popular for the rest of the century.
- The Tatler (1709–1711)
- Theological Repository (1769–1771, 1784, 1786, 1788)
- Town and Country Magazine (1769–)
- The Tribune (1795–1796). Edited by John Thelwall
- Universal Chronicle, which published Samuel Johnson's The Idler (1758–1760)
- Vetusta Monumenta (1718–1906). Illustrated antiquarian papers published at intermittent intervals by the Society of Antiquaries of London.
- The Watchman (1796). Founded and edited by Samuel Taylor Coleridge
- The Weekly Register (early 1730s). Anti-ministerial periodical featuring essays by James Ralph.
- Wesleyan Methodist Magazine (1778–1969). Monthly
- The World (1753–1756). Every Thursday. Founded by "Adam Fitz-Adam" (i.e. Edwin Moore) and published by the Dodsleys.

== See also ==
- List of 18th-century British periodicals for women
- List of eighteenth century journals
- List of nineteenth-century British periodicals
