= List of 18th-century British periodicals for women =

According to the Encyclopædia Britannica, "In the 18th century, when women were expected to participate in social and political life, those magazines aimed primarily at women were relatively robust and stimulating in content." Here follows a list of some of the major British periodicals marketed to women in the period. Between them they cover a wide range of material, from Augustan periodical essays, to advice, to mathematical puzzles, to fashion. Some were written and edited by women and others by men. In many cases, both editorship and individual authorship is obscure.

== Periodicals marketed to women ==
- The Ladies' Mercury (27 February 1693 – 17 March 1693): weekly; 4 issues
- The Ladies' Diary: or, Woman's Almanack (1704–1841): annually
- The Female Tatler (8 July 1709 – 31 March 1710): thrice weekly; 115 issues
- The Female Spectator (1744–1746): monthly; 24 issues; edited/written by Eliza Haywood
- The Ladies magazine or, the Universal entertainer (1749–1753)
- The Lady's Museum (1760–1761): monthly; edited/written by Charlotte Lennox
- The Lady's Magazine; or, Polite Companion for the Fair Sex (1759–1766): monthly
- The Lady's Magazine; or Entertaining Companion for the Fair Sex, Appropriated Solely to Their Use and Amusement, (1770–1832): monthly; merged with The Lady's Monthly Museum in 1832 and La Belle Assemblée in 1837
- The Lady's Monthly Museum; Or, Polite Repository of Amusement and Instruction (1798–1832): monthly; merged with The Lady's Magazine in 1832 and La Belle Assemblée in 1837

=== Notable contributions by women to general periodicals ===
- Analytical Review (1788 to 1798): Mary Wollstonecraft
- The Athenian Mercury (1690–1697): Elizabeth Singer Rowe
- The Examiner (1710–1714): Delarivier Manley
- The Gentleman's Magazine (1731–1922): Mary Barber; Anna Eliza Bray; Susanna Highmore; Laetitia Pilkington
- The Monthly Mirror (1795 to 1811): Eliza Kirkham Mathews
- Monthly Review (1749–1845): Anna Letitia Barbauld; Elizabeth Moody

=== Images ===
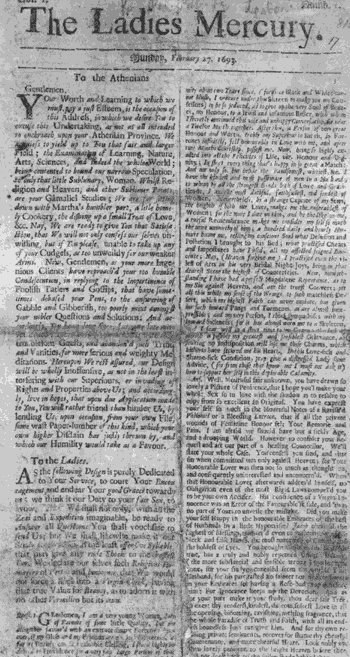
The Ladies Mercury, February 27, 1693

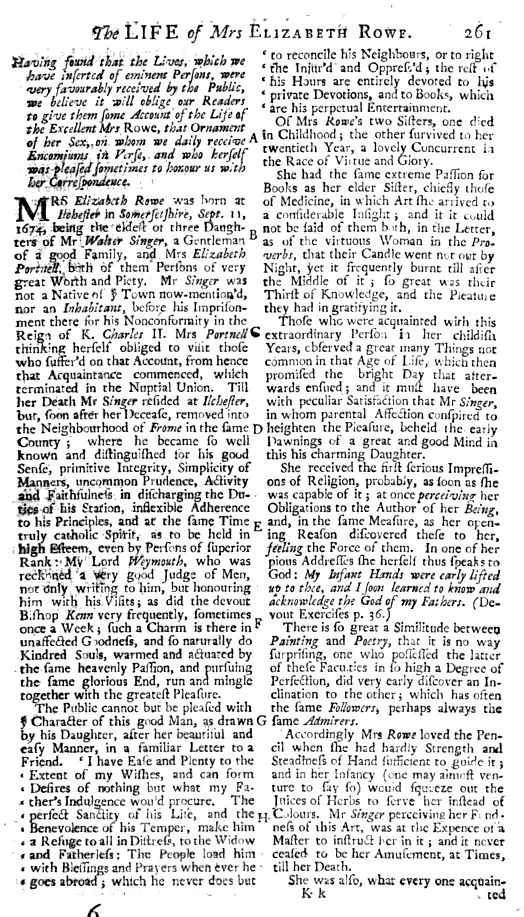
"The Life of Mrs. Elizabeth Row," The Gentleman's Magazine (May 1739)

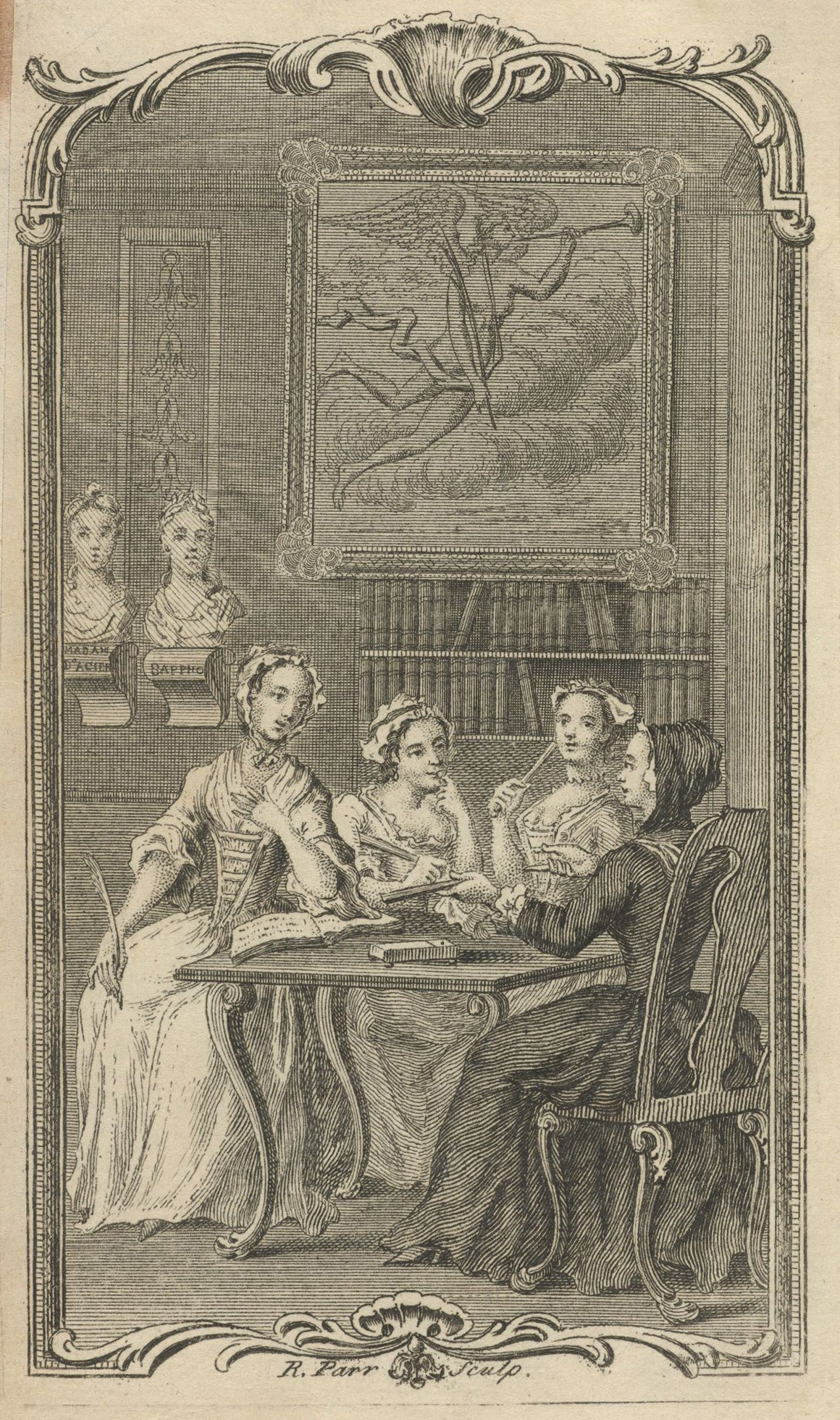
Frontispiece to The Female Spectator, London: 1746, by Eliza Haywood

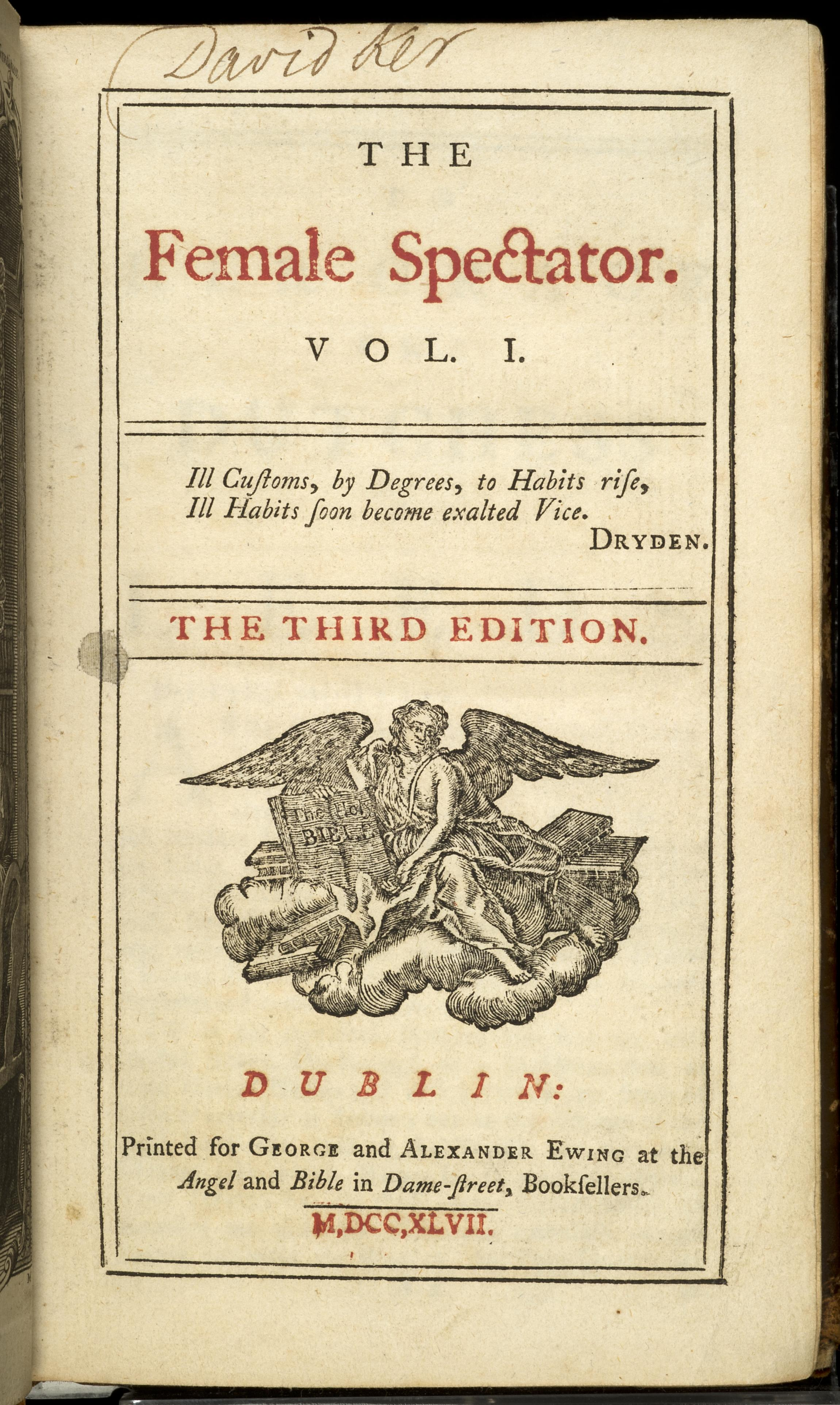
Title page, The Female Spectator 3rd ed. Vol. I, Dublin, 1747

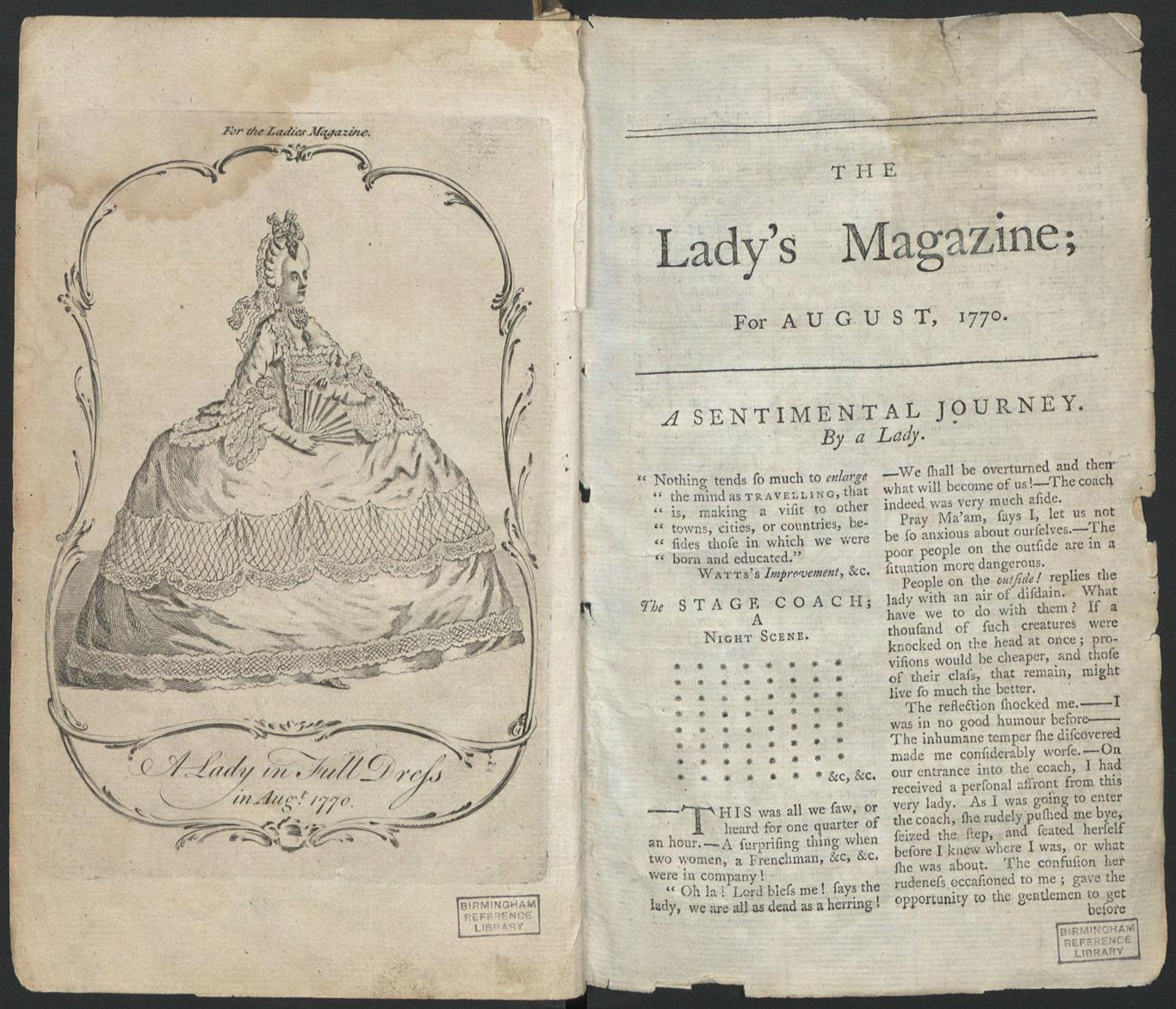
The Lady's Magazine, 1 August 1770

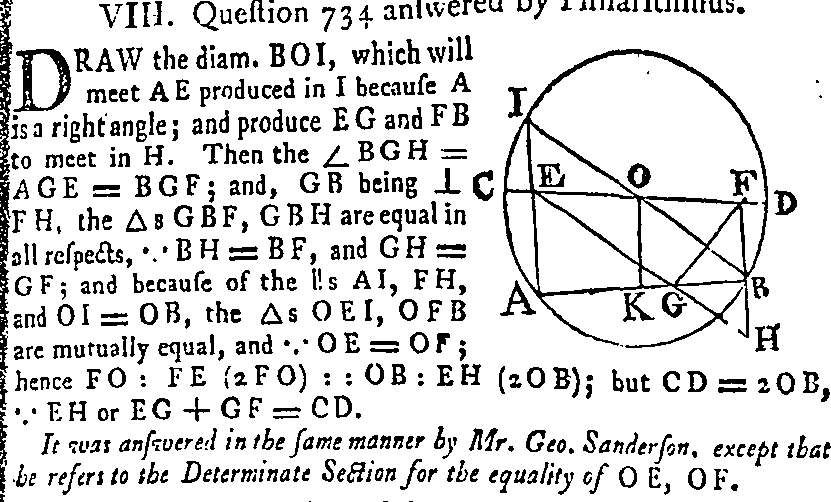
Image of mathematical solution, The Ladies' Diary, 1779

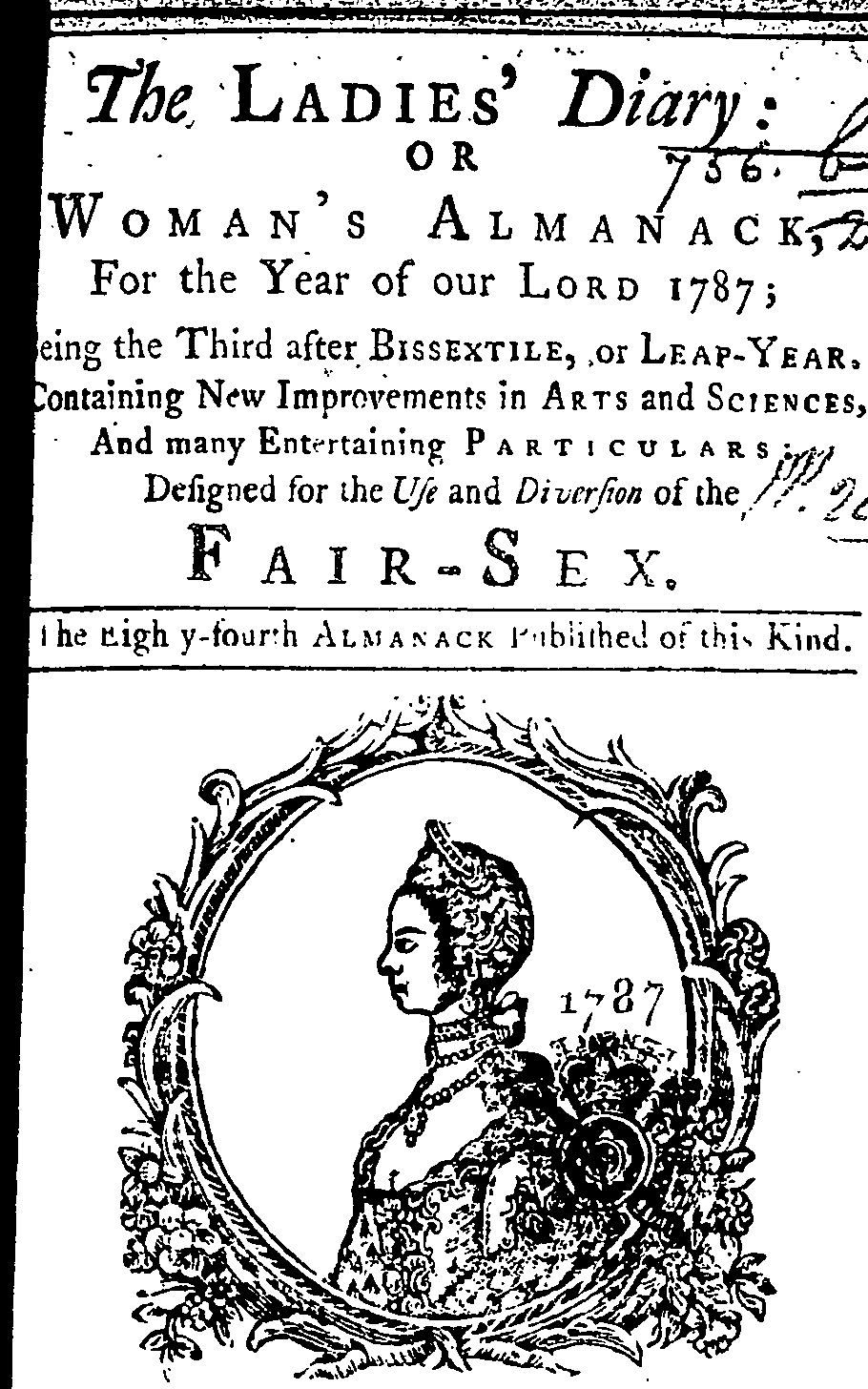
Cover, The Ladies' Diary, 1787

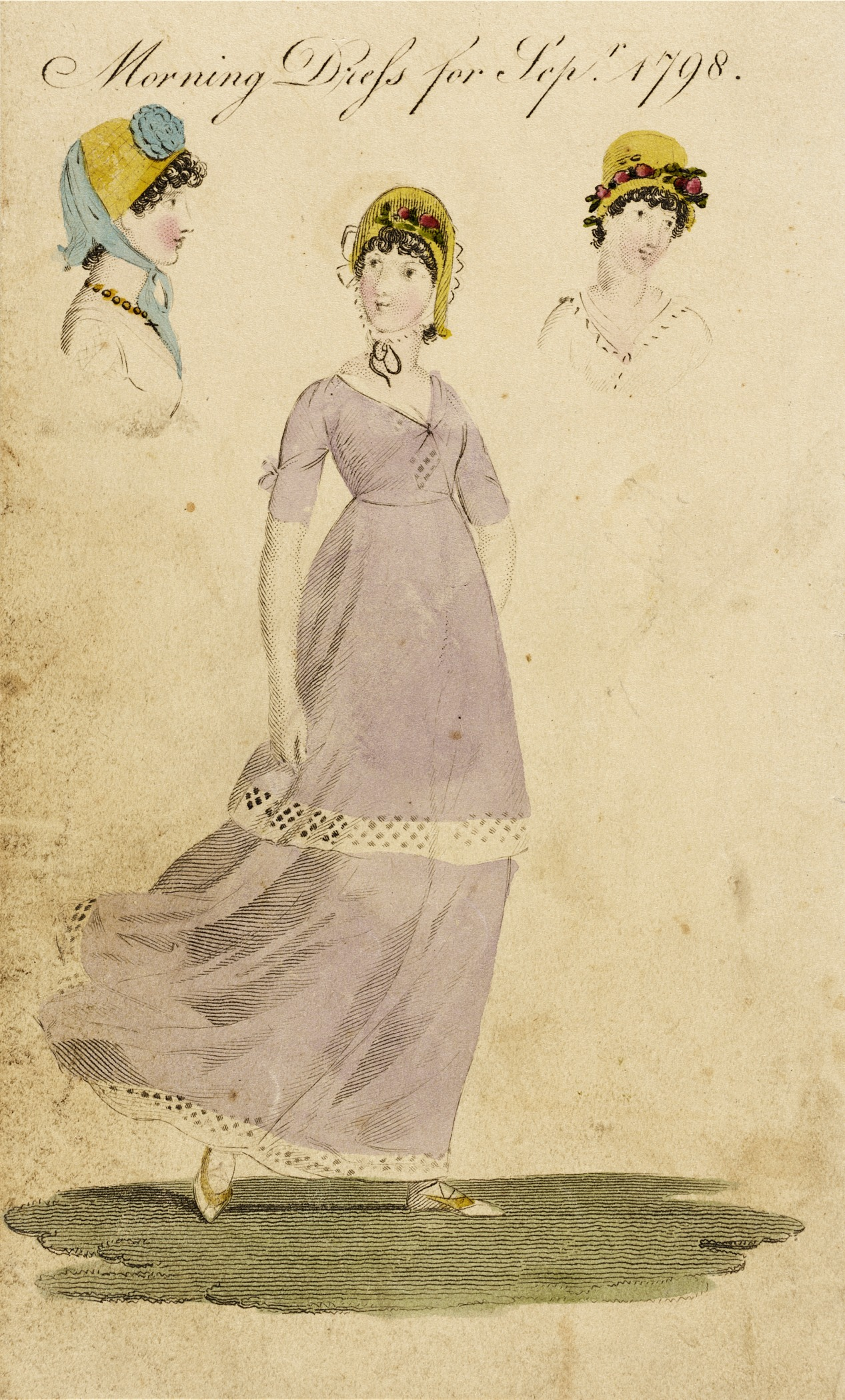
Fashion Plate: Morning dress, The Lady's Monthly Museum, Sept. 1798

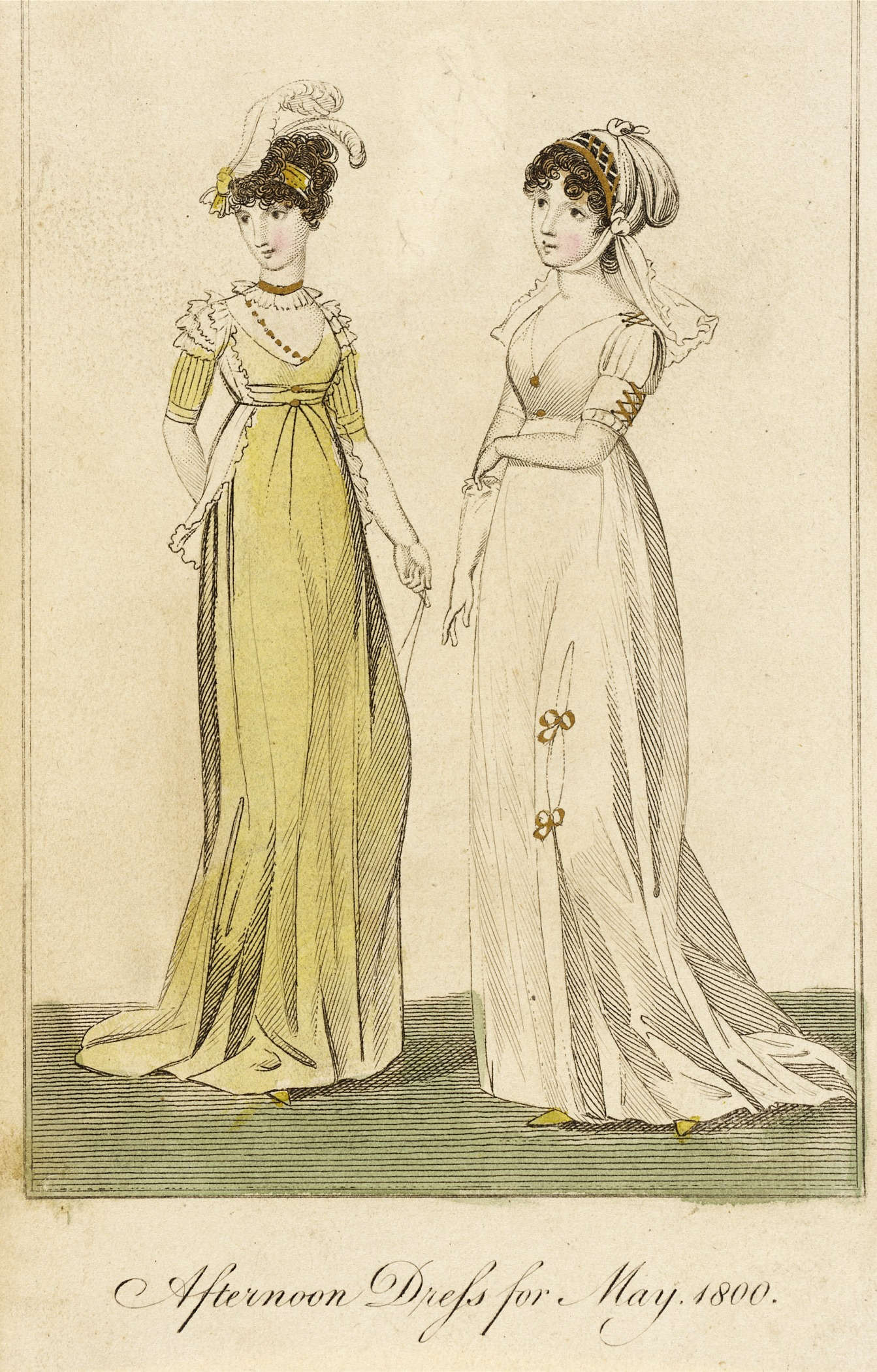
Fashion Plate: Afternoon dress, The Lady's Monthly Museum, May 1800

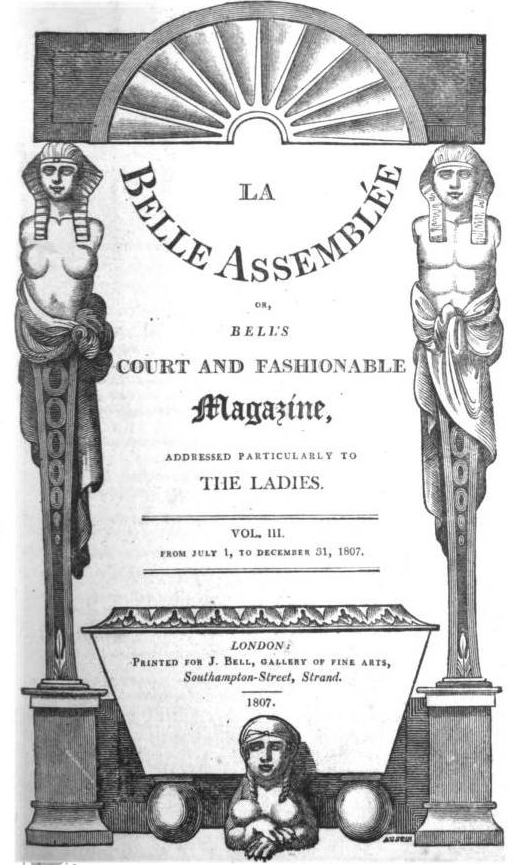
Title page from La Belle Assemblée or, Bell's court and fashionable magazine Volume III, 1807

== See also ==
- The August essay/journalism
- History of women's magazines
- List of 18th-century British periodicals
- List of defunct women's magazines
