= The Universal Magazine =

The Universal Magazine may refer to:

- The Universal Magazine of Knowledge and Pleasure (1747–1814), published in London
- The Universal Magazine (1900 monthly) (1900–1902), published in London

== See also ==
- List of 18th-century British periodicals
