= Elizabeth Moody =

Elizabeth Moody may refer to:

- Elizabeth Moody (poet) (1737–1814), British poet and literary critic
- Elizabeth Moody (actress) (1939–2010), New Zealand film, television and theatre actress and director
- Elizabeth Moody, subject of Mrs Elizabeth Moody with her sons Samuel and Thomas, a portrait by Thomas Gainsborough
