= John Caverhill =

Scottish physician and writer

- Died: 1 September 1781; Melrose, Roxburghshire
- Occupation: Physician

John Caverhill (died 1 September 1781) was a Scottish physician and writer.

Caverhill was admitted a licentiate of the Royal College of Physicians in 1767. He was elected a Fellow of the Royal Society in 1760 and obtained his M.D. from Marischal College.

In 1769, Caverhill authored Treatise on the Cause and Cure of Gout an early work on gout, which he put forward the theory that the matter of nerves was earthy, and descended through the nerves to form the bones, and that the friction of this earthy substance, in its way to the bones, gave rise to animal heat. A year later, he followed this by Experiments on the Cause of Heat in Living Animals in which he attempted to prove his theory by a large number of barbarous experiments on rabbits, destroying various nerves or portions of the spinal cord, and awaiting the death of the animals.

Caverhill's experiments on animals were criticized as cruel and immoral in the Monthly Review. Caverhill died at Melrose, Roxburghshire.

== Selected publications ==
- Treatise on the Cause and Cure of Gout (1769)
- Experiments on the Cause of Heat in Living Animals (1770)
- A Dissertation on Nervous Ganglions and Nervous Plexus (1772)
- Explanation of the Seventy Weeks of Daniel (1777)
