= La Belle Assemblée =

Defunct British women's magazine

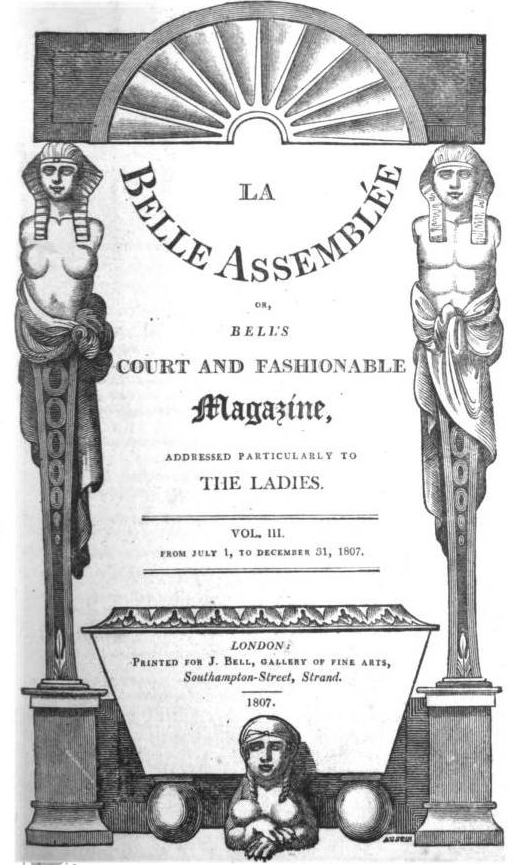
La Belle Assemblée, title page, Volume III, July to December 1807

La Belle Assemblée (in full La Belle Assemblée or, Bell's Court and Fashionable Magazine Addressed Particularly to the Ladies) was a British women's magazine published from 1806 to 1837, founded by John Bell (1745–1831).

== Publishing history ==
The magazine was published as La Belle Assemblée from 1806 until May 1832. It became The Court Magazine and Belle Assemblée from 1832 to 1837. After 1837 the Belle Assemblée name was dropped when the magazine merged with the Lady's Magazine and Museum (itself a merger of The Lady's Magazine and a competitor) to become The Court Magazine and Monthly Critic.

It was published by John Bell from 1806 until his retirement in 1821, and by G. & W. Whittaker & Co. from 1823 to 1829. Between these dates the magazine was listed as "Published for the proprietors".

== Content ==
La Belle Assemblée is now best known for its fashion plates of Regency era styles, but until the 1820s it also published original poetry and fiction, non-fiction articles on politics and science, book and theatre reviews, and serialized novels, including Oakwood Hall by Catherine Hutton. Other notable contributors to La Belle Assemblée include Mary Shelley. Contributions from readers were also encouraged and published.

While each number of La Belle Assemblée typically contained five plates—one depicting a member of the court or fashionable society, two depicting the latest fashions, and a further two providing sheet music and a sewing pattern—the magazine was not dominated by the frivolities of fashionable dress. Indeed, Bell separated the portion of the work dealing with the fashions of the month from the remainder of the publication. One could (at least initially) purchase either of the two divisions of the work separately; the first consisting of the bulk of the letterpress, together with two of the plates, the second ('La Belle Assemblée') consisting of the fashion plates and sewing pattern, together, usually, with four pages describing the plates and discussing the latest London and Paris fashions.

In the 1820s, changing expectations of the role of women in British society coincided with a marked decrease in the intellectual scope of La Belle Assemblée and its competitors, which increasingly focused on fashion and domestic pursuits.

Until spring 1822, the fashion plates were labeled a month ahead, e.g., the plates published in May 1810 were marked June 1810. Mary Ann Bell was a well known contributor to the fashion content in the publication.

The changes in the early 1820s may have resulted from John Bell's retirement some time in 1821.

== Similar magazines ==
Similarly titled fashion publications included The Penny Belle Assemblée or Maids, Wives and Widows' Gazette of Fashions (1830s), the Weekly Belle Assemblée, and its successor the New Monthly Belle Assemblée (1834–1870).

== See also ==
- Gallery of Fashion
- List of 18th-century British periodicals
- List of 18th-century British periodicals for women
- List of 19th-century British periodicals

== Plates from La Belle Assemblée ==
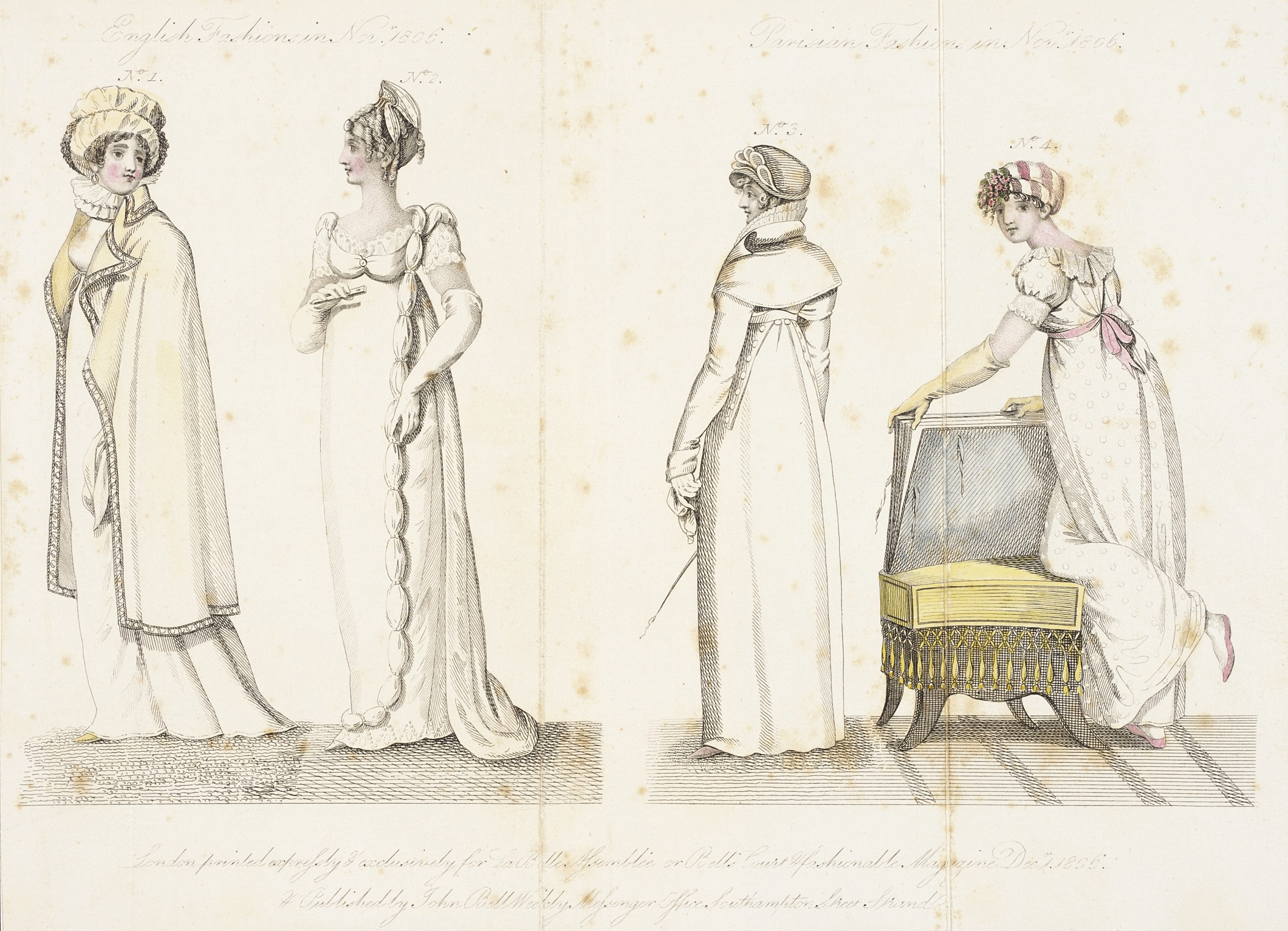
Fashion plate, Nov 1806 (from Oct 1806 issue)

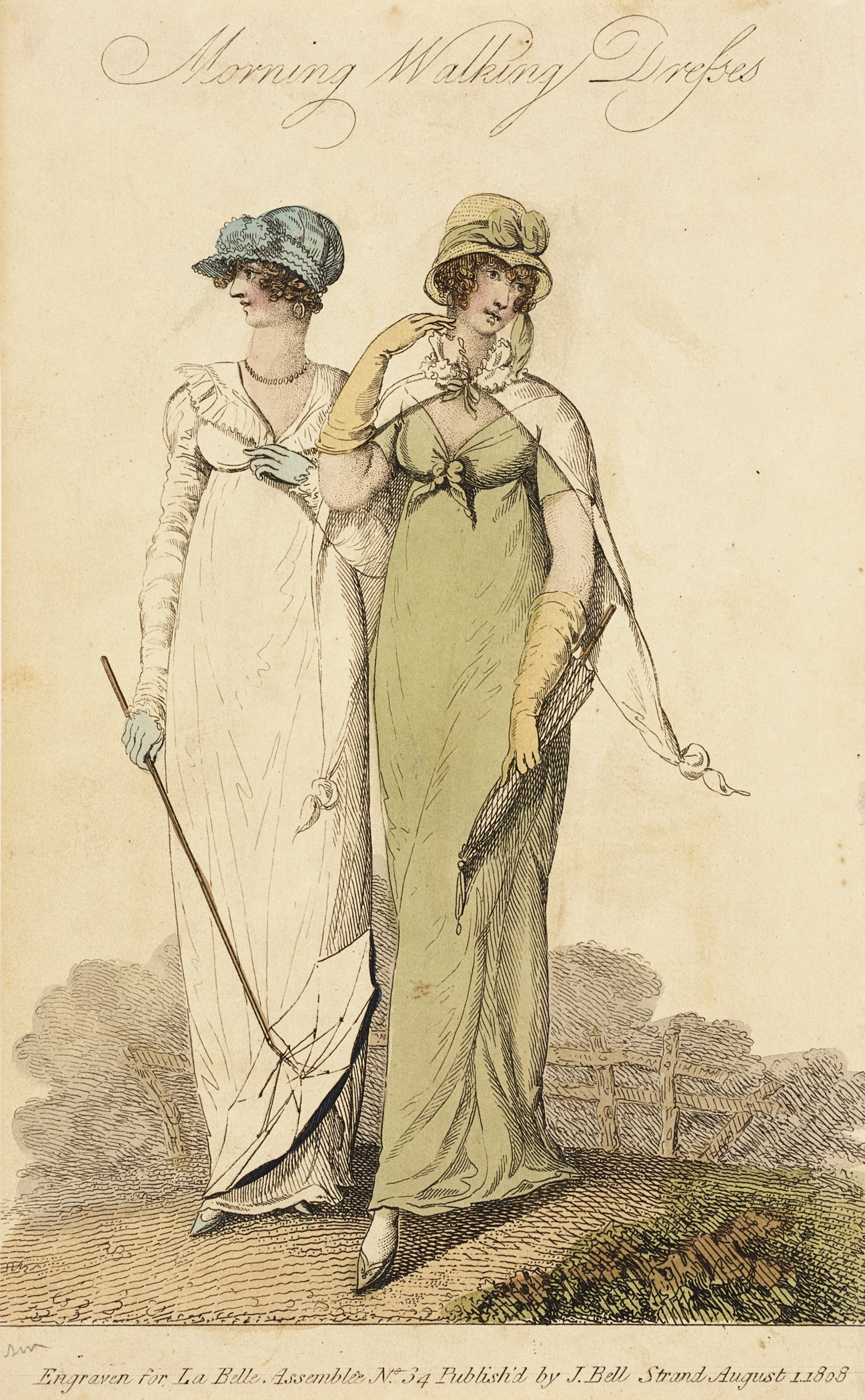
Fashion plate, Aug 1808 (from Jul 1808 issue)

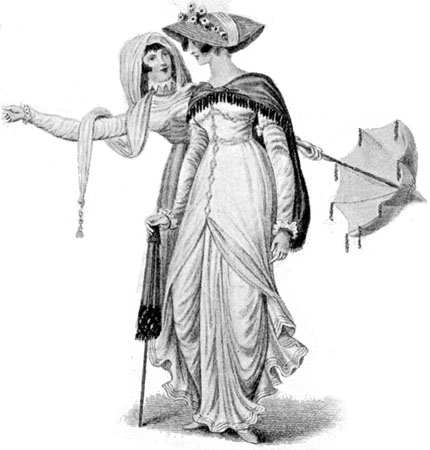
Fashion plate, 1809

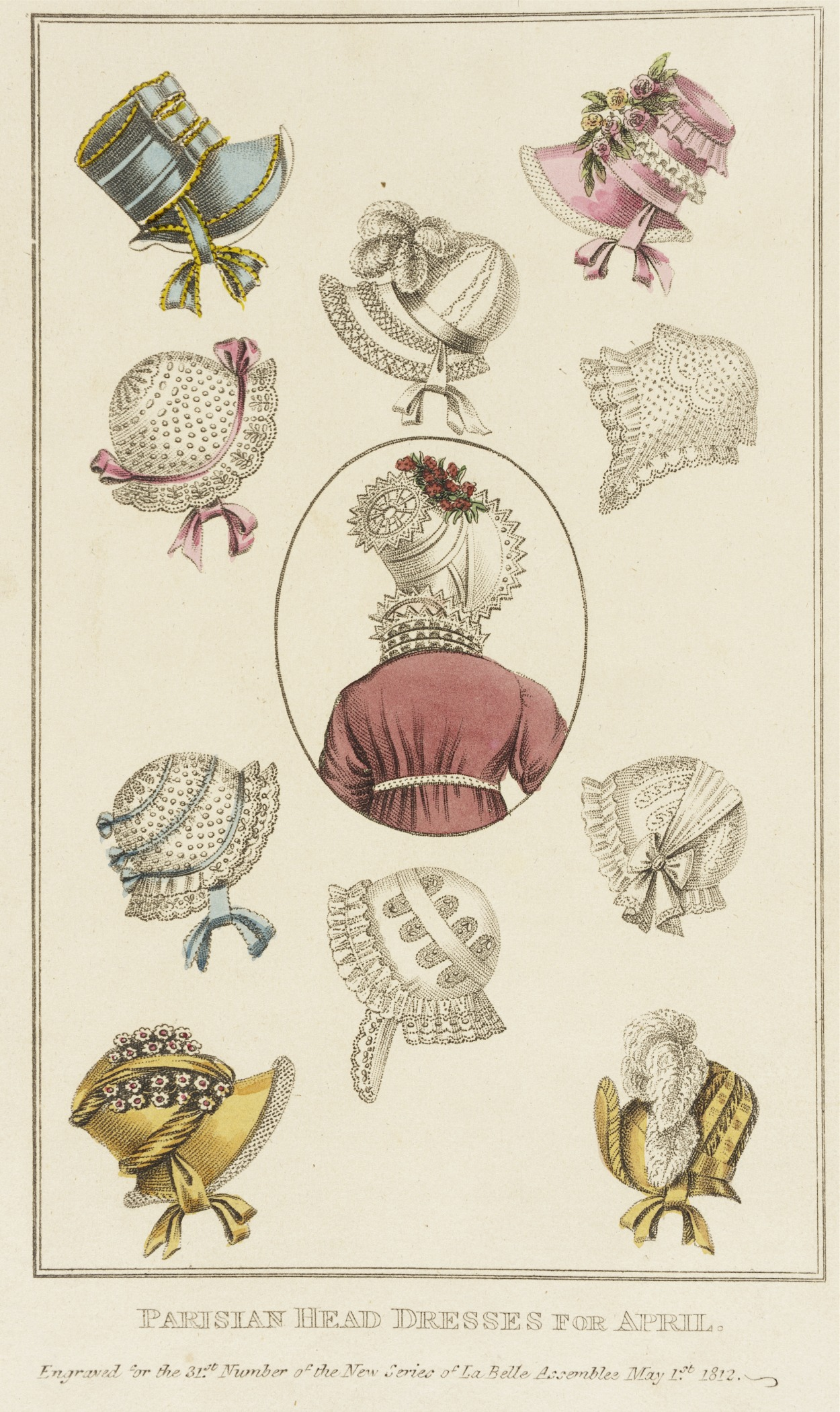
Fashion plate, May 1812 (from Apr 1812 issue)

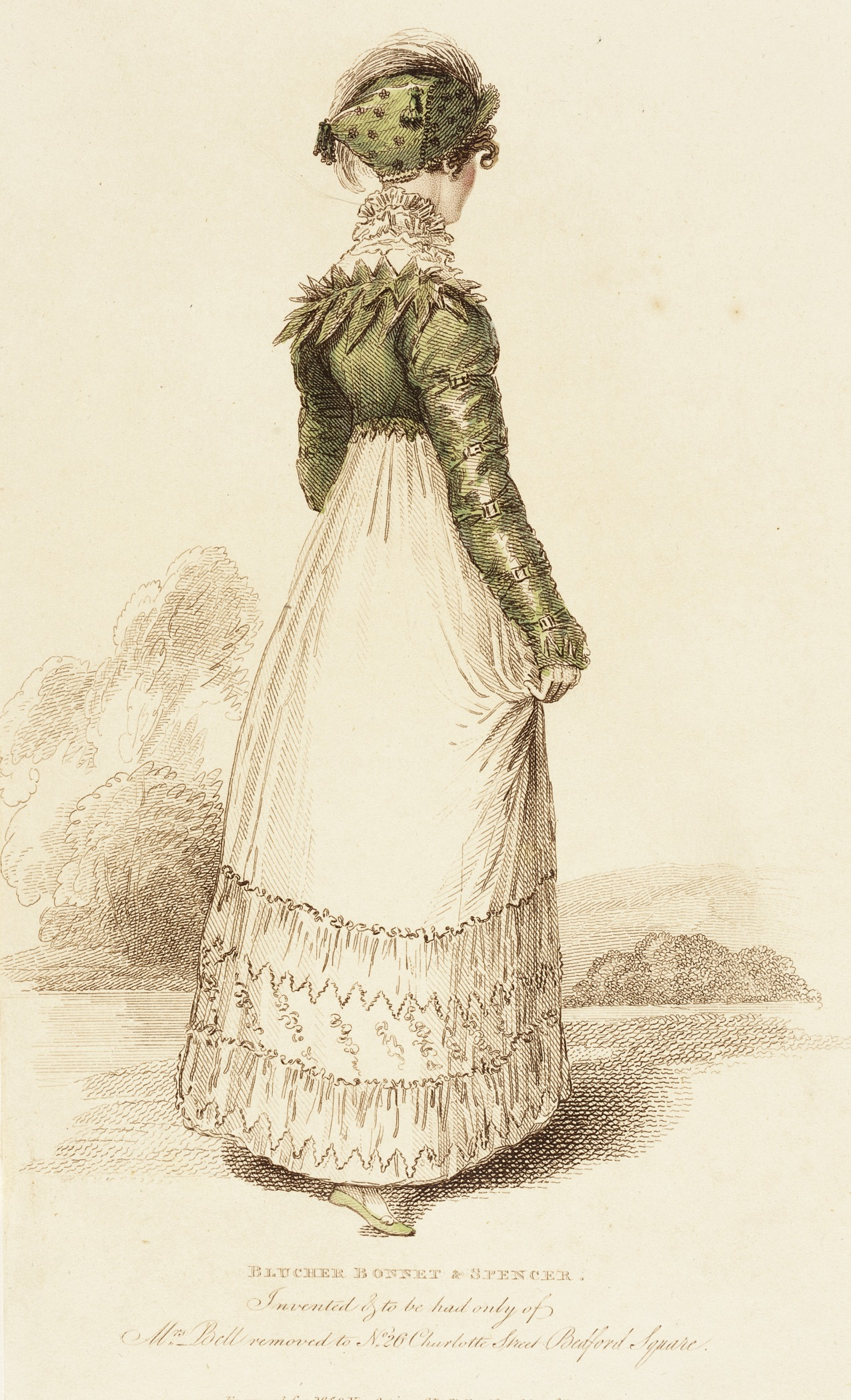
Fashion plate, Jun 1814 (from May 1814 issue)

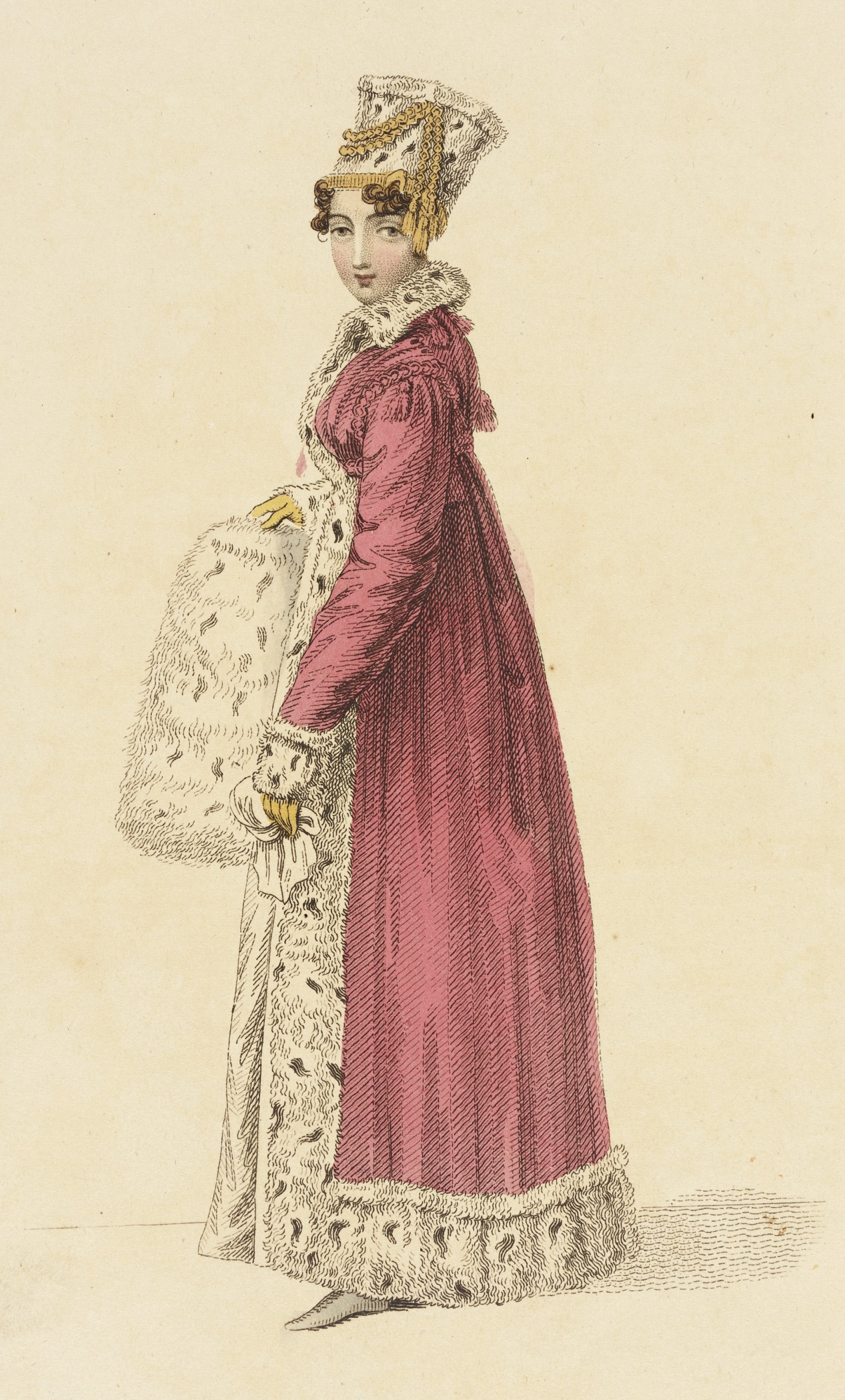
Fashion plate, Jan 1817 (from Dec 1816 issue)

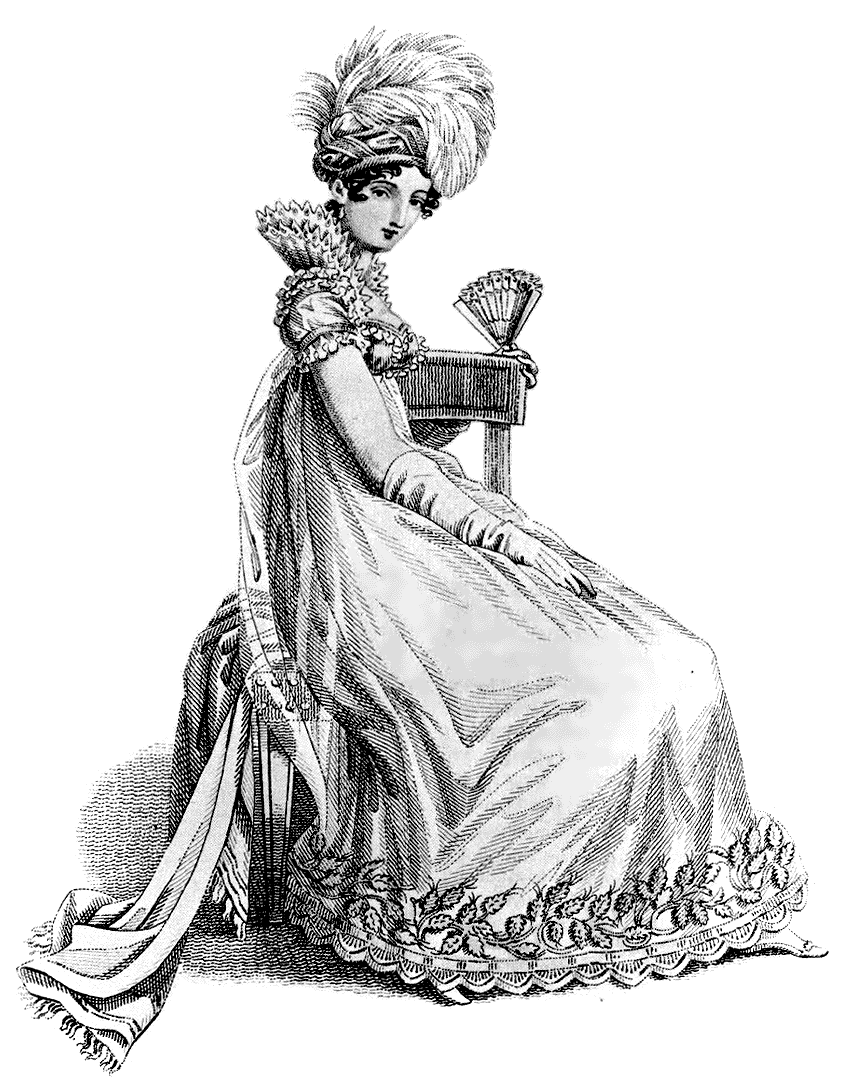
Fashion plate, ballgown, 1818

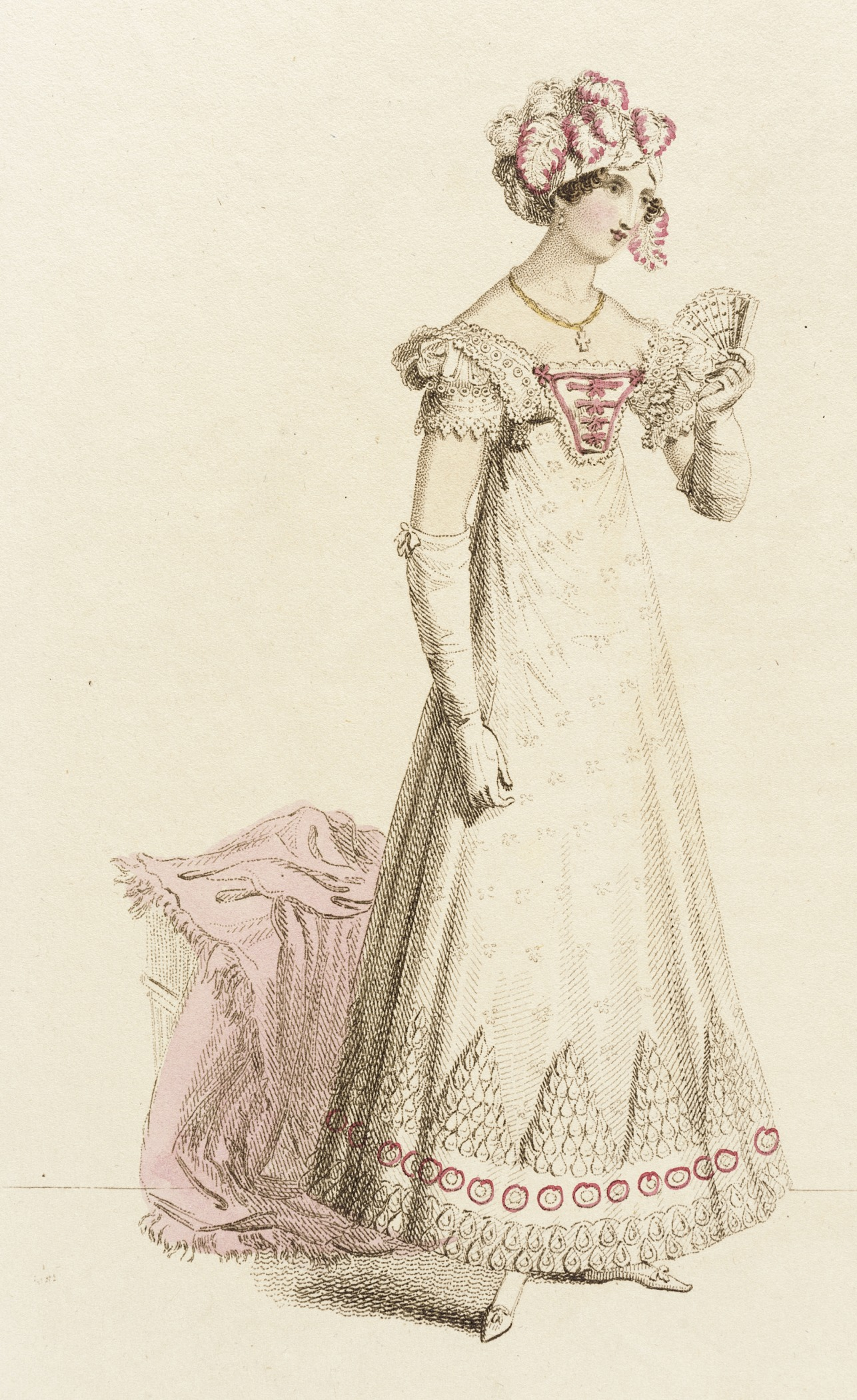
Fashion plate, Jan 1820 (from Dec 1819 issue)

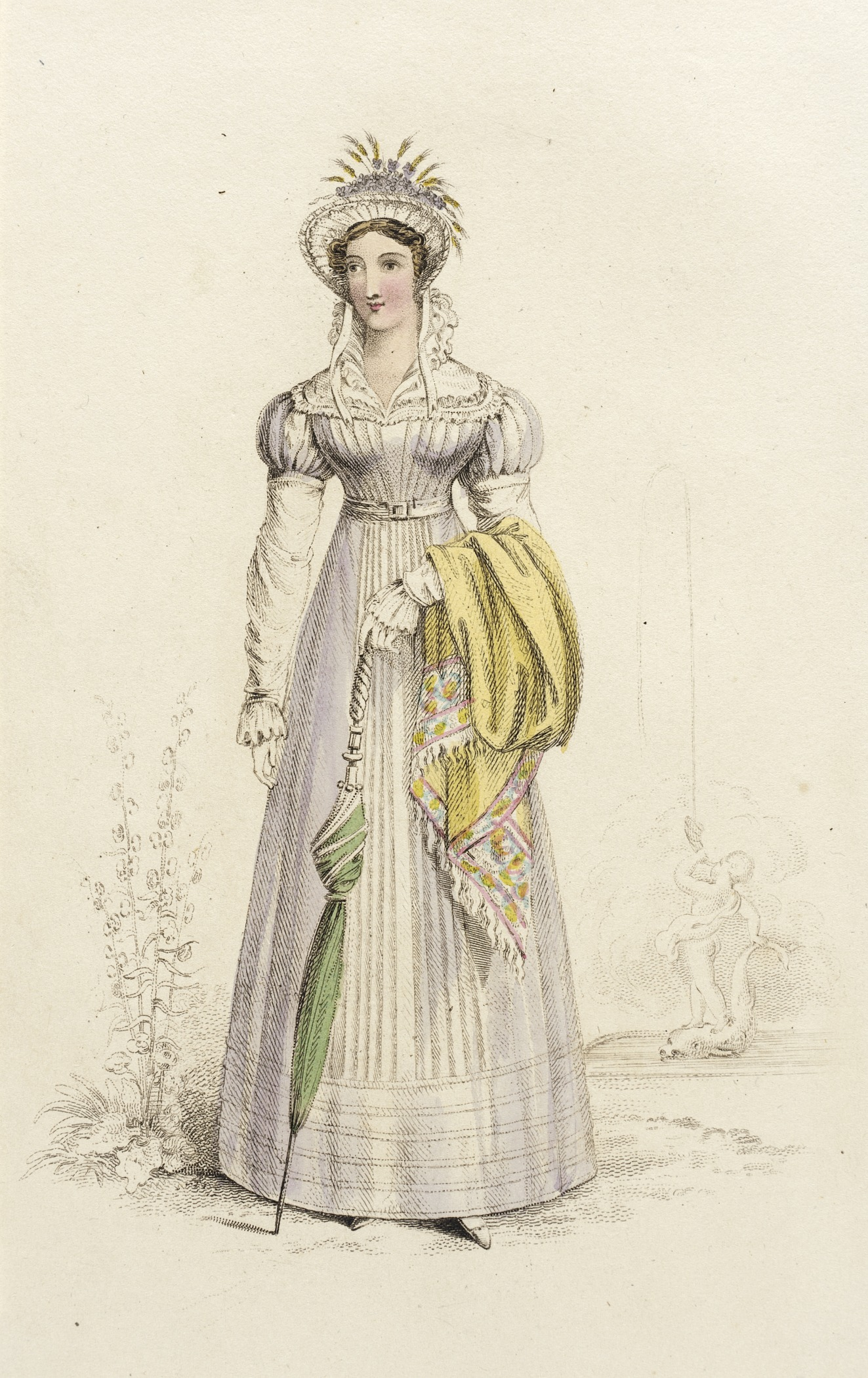
Fashion plate, Jun 1822

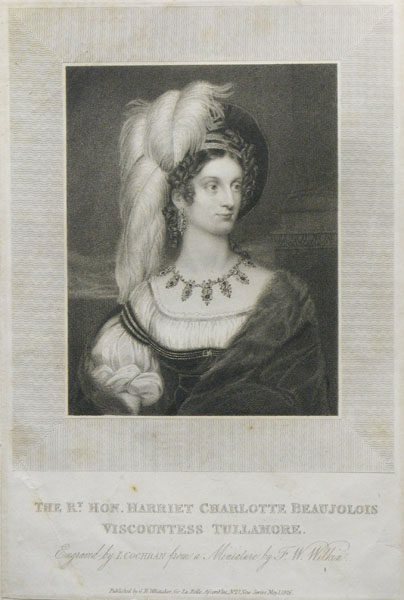
Portrait of the Rt. Hon. Harriet Charlotte Beaujolois, Viscountess Tullamore, engraved by John Cochran, 1826

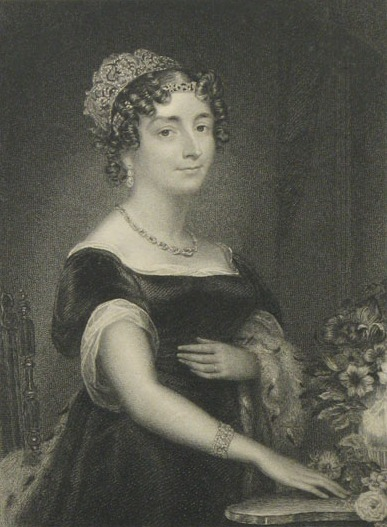
Charlotte Percy, Duchess of Northumberland. Stipple engraving by T. A. Dean, 1829
