= Patent leather =

Type of coated leather

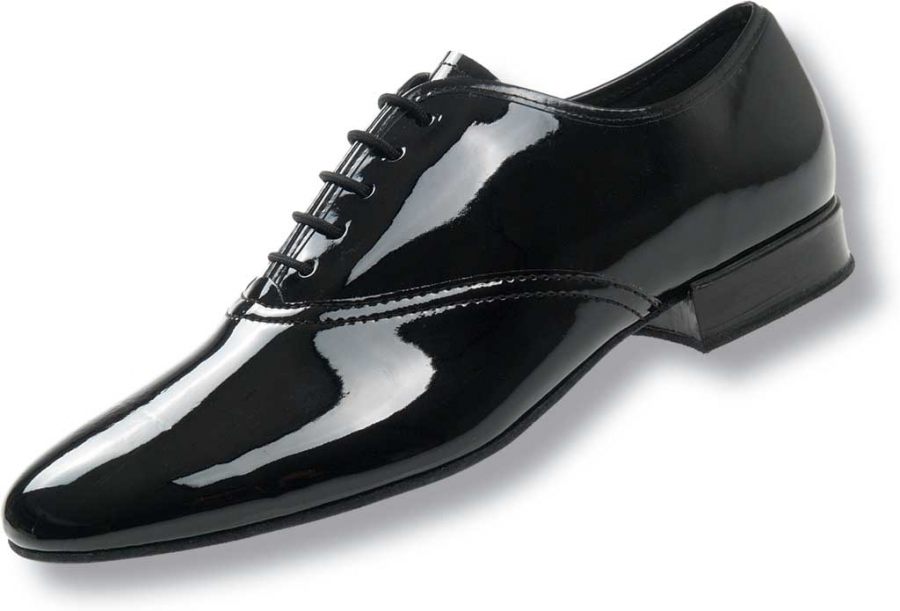
A men's black patent leather shoe

Patent leather is a type of coated leather with a high-gloss finish. In general, patent leather is fine grain leather that is treated to give it a glossy appearance. Characterized by a glass-like finish that catches the light, patent leather comes in all colors just like regular leather. In addition to the mirror-like finish, patent leather is also virtually waterproof, while still retaining a very flexible texture. The visual aspects of patent leather have made it a sought-after material for formal accessories.

Patent leather and poromerics are used in applications where an eye-catching glossy appearance is the most important consideration. Examples include fashion items such as wallets and handbags, dance and uniform shoes, thigh-high boots and professional wrestling boots, belts and trench coats. In recent years patent leather has become a popular material for limited-edition sneakers.

Originally a lacquer coating that was based on linseed oil was used; the process was then widely substituted with plastics such as Parkesine. Modern patent leather is typically made with a plastic or synthetic coating. This has also allowed for the availability of more colors and patterns.

Patent leather is sometimes confused with artificial leathers such as DuPont's Corfam and Kuraray's Clarino, which are artificial materials with a similar glossy appearance.

== History ==
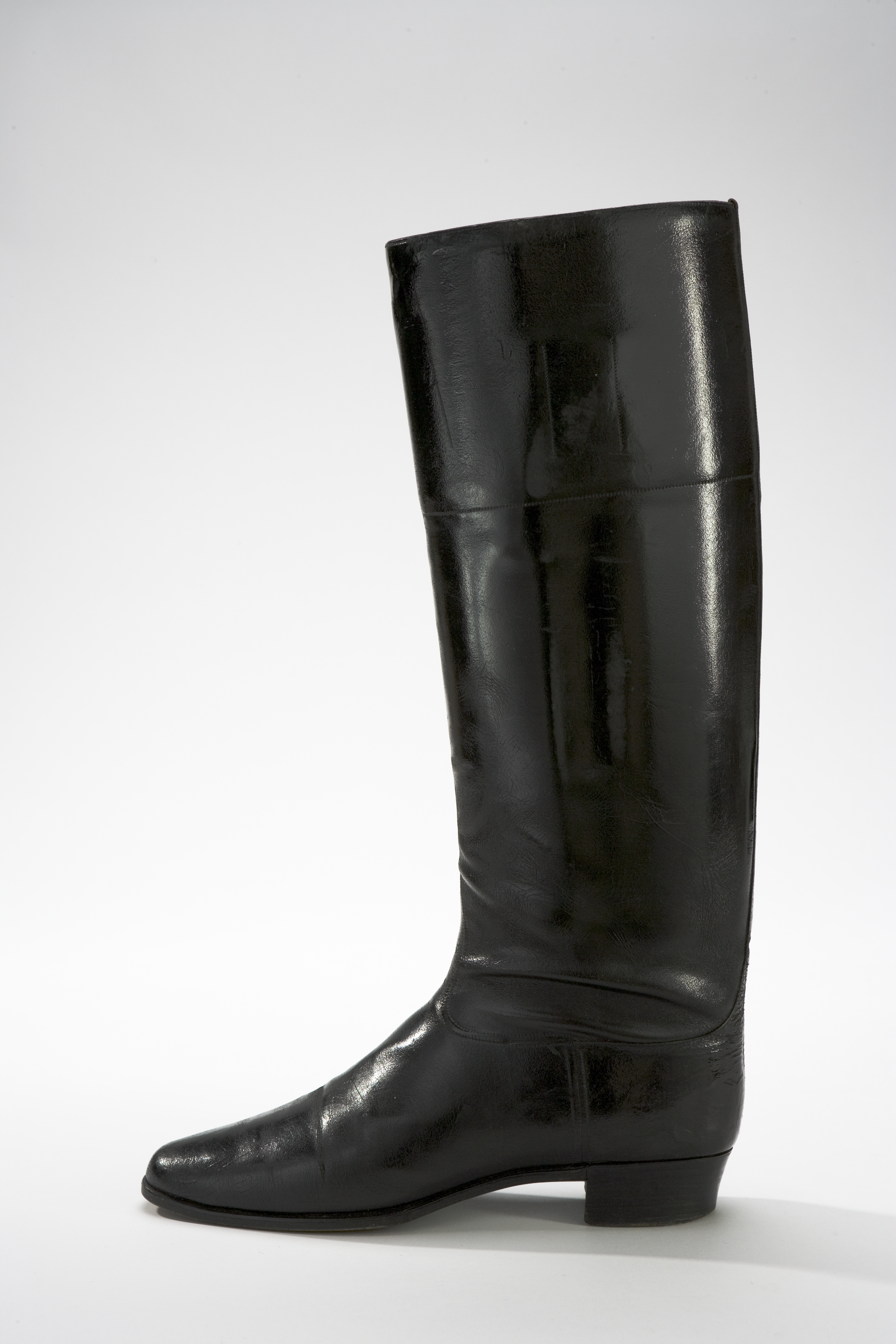
Riding boot from 1910–1920s

An early reference to patent leather is in the 1793 British periodical The Bee, or Literary Weekly Intelligencer, which notes, in an article entitled "Hand's patent leather", that "a gentleman of the name of Hand" in Birmingham, England, obtained a patent for preparing flexible leather having a glaze and polish that renders it impervious to water and need only be wiped with a sponge to restore it to its original lustre. In November 1799, inventor Edmund Prior, of Holborn, London, England, received a patent for a method of painting and colouring all kinds of leather; and, in January 1805, inventor Charles Mollersten, of Hackney Wick, received a patent for applying a chemical composition in the preparation of hides, skins, and leather to give "a beautiful gloss". However, patent leather primarily owes its popularity to Seth Boyden.

The coating process was introduced to the United States and improved by inventor Seth Boyden, of Newark, New Jersey, in 1818, with commercial manufacture beginning September 20, 1819. Boyden's process, which he did not patent, used a lacquer coating that was based on linseed oil. In 1818, Boyden received a piece of German-made patent leather, said to be a German military cap front, from a local carriage manufacturer and used that to investigate the possibility of creating a version of leather in the United States that was treated in such a way that the material would be decidedly more dressy than work boots and similar leather goods, but retain its desirable qualities of protection and durability. Reverse engineering the European patent leather, he discovered a way to produce his patent leather. Using a series of coating treatments based on linseed oil, the new shiny leather began commercial production on September 20, 1819. Boyden's efforts resulted in the production of glossy leather that quickly caught on as a complement to formal dress. Boyden never patented his inventive process.

A subsequent European method of manufacture was described in 1906 as follows:

In the preparation of enamelled leather, a foundation coat of lampblack mixed with linseed oil has been laid on the flesh side, since the infancy of the industry in Europe. Successive coats of this mixture are applied, the skin being allowed to dry and the surface ground down with pumice-stone after each coat. Then the skins are blackened again with a fluid black mixed with turpentine, and hung up to dry again. After the skins have been allowed to settle, being laid in a pile for about a month, or longer if possible, the leather is tacked onto a frame and receives a brush coat of varnish. A baking follows in an oven of moderate heat. The temperature is gradually raised and the baking continued three days. Exposure to the sun for ten hours completes the process. Recently American manufacturers have been making patent leather from chrome-tanned skins. The product is quite different, as is also the process employed. The leather is softer, more flexible, and takes a less brilliant polish than that made from bark-tanned leather, but it is much less likely to crack and is more suitable for shoes than the brittle and inflexible leather made by the older process.

Later, the substitution of plastics such as Parkesine in lieu of treatments with linseed oil allowed patent leather to be produced more cheaply. Eventually, synthetic resins further simplified the process and cut production costs even further, making mass production of patent leather possible.

In the British fashion trends of the 1960s, shoes, boots, and handbags were often made of patent leather or vinyl. Patent shoes were available in black, yellow, green, orange, hot pink, white, blue and red.

== Product care ==
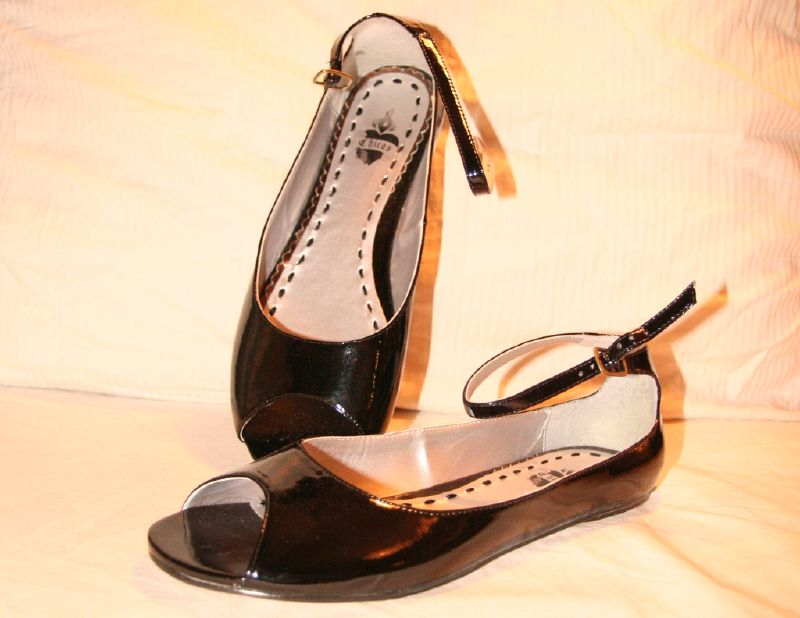
Patent leather shoes

Patent leather and poromerics are cleaned in a similar way. Dirt adhering to the coating can be removed with a damp cloth, using a mild soap if needed. Minor scratches and scuff marks in the coating can be removed using one of several special-purpose patent leather and poromeric cleaners on the market. With wear and tear, patent leather will eventually lose its glossy finish, but will still be smoother than most other types of leather, looking almost rubbery.

Lighter color patent leather is prone to color migration. When a patent item is stored next to a colored item, the dye from the colored item can migrate into the patent leather. Storing patent leather items in a white dust bag will help prevent this.
