= John Bew =

John Bew may refer to:

- John Bew (bookseller) (1774–1793), bookseller and publisher in London
- John Bew (historian), professor of history
