= The Adventurer (newspaper) =

18th-century British newspaper

The Adventurer (1752–1754) was a London 18th-century bi-weekly newspaper undertaken after the successful conclusion of The Rambler. Contributors included John Hawkesworth and Samuel Johnson.
