= The Tatler (1709 journal) =

18th-century literary journal

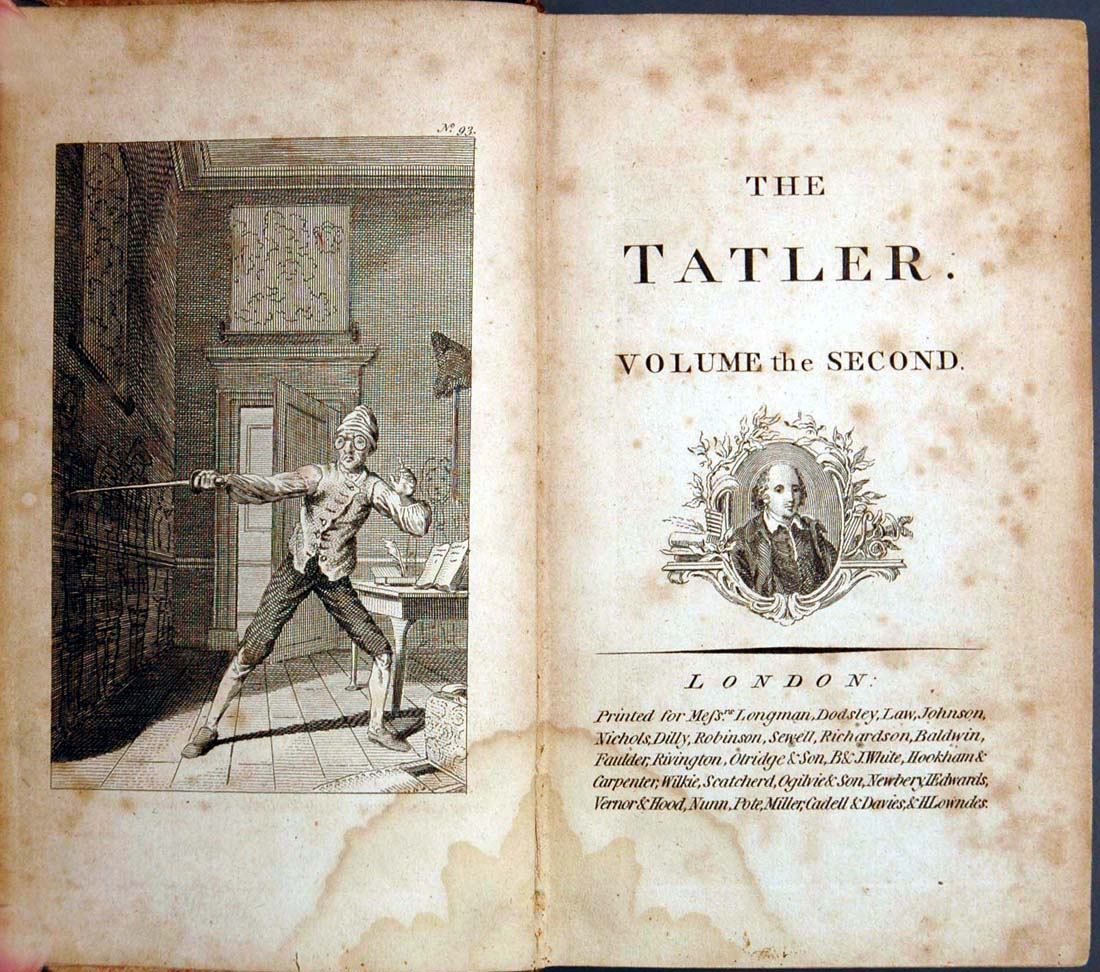
- The Tatler (1709 journal)
- Categories: Fashion
- Frequency: Thrice weekly
- First issue: 1709
- Country: United Kingdom
- Language: English

The Tatler was a British literary and society journal begun by Richard Steele in 1709 and published for two years. It represented a new approach to journalism, featuring cultivated essays on contemporary manners, and established the pattern that would be copied in such British classics as Addison and Steele's The Spectator, Samuel Johnson's The Rambler and The Idler, and Goldsmith's Citizen of the World. The Tatler would also influence essayists as late as Charles Lamb and William Hazlitt. Addison and Steele liquidated The Tatler in order to make a fresh start with the similar Spectator, and the collected issues of Tatler are usually published in the same volume as the collected Spectator.

== 1709 journal ==
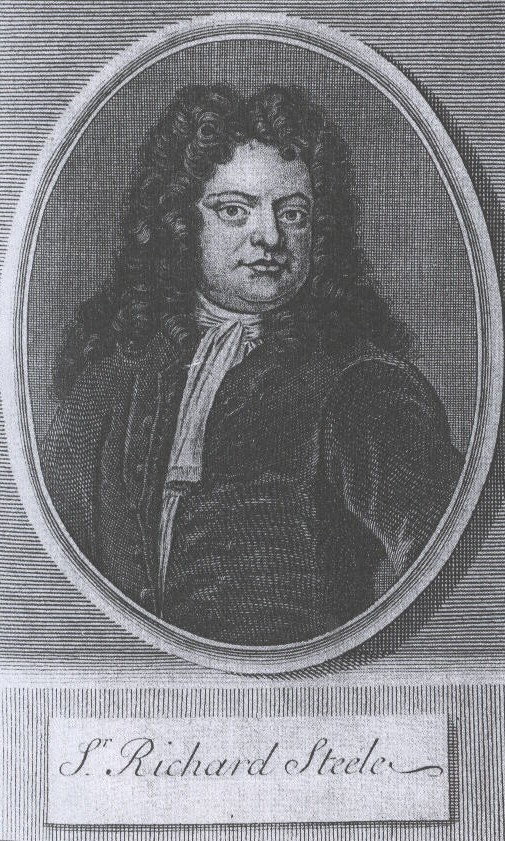
Richard Steele

The Tatler was founded in 1709 by Richard Steele, who used the pen name "Isaac Bickerstaff, Esquire". This is the first known such consistently adopted journalistic persona, which adapted to the first person, as it were, the 17th-century genre of "characters", as first established in English by Sir Thomas Overbury and then expanded by Lord Shaftesbury's Characteristicks (1711). Steele's conceit (embodied in the title "The Tatler") was to publish the news and gossip heard in various London coffeehouses (in reality he mixed real gossip with invented stories of his own), and, so he declared in the opening paragraph, to leave the subject of politics to the newspapers, while presenting Whiggish views and correcting middle-class manners, while instructing "these Gentlemen, for the most part being Persons of strong Zeal, and weak Intellects ... what to think." To assure complete coverage of local gossip (or 'tattle' - hence the title), he pretended to place a reporter in each of the city's four most popular coffeehouses, and the text of each issue was subdivided according to the names of these four: accounts of manners and mores were datelined from White's; literary notes from Will's; notes of antiquarian interest were dated from the Grecian Coffee House; and news items from St. James's Coffee House.

The journal was originally published three times a week, and Steele eventually brought in contributions from his literary friends Jonathan Swift and Joseph Addison, though both of them pretended to be writing as Isaac Bickerstaff and authorship was revealed only when the papers were collected in a bound volume. The original Tatler was published for only two years, from 12 April 1709 to 2 January 1711. A collected edition was published in 1710–11, with the title The Lucubrations of Isaac Bickerstaff, Esq. In 1711, Steele and Addison decided to liquidate The Tatler, and co-founded The Spectator magazine, which used a different persona than Bickerstaff.

== Subsequent incarnations ==
Several later journals revived the name Tatler. Three short series are preserved in the Burney Collection:

- John Morphew, the original printer, continued to produce further issues in 1711 under the "Isaac Bickerstaffe" name from 4 January (No. 272) to 17 May (No. 330).
- A single issue (numbered 1) of a rival Tatler was published by Baldwin on 11 January 1711.
- In 1753–4, several issues by "William Bickerstaffe, nephew of the late Isaac Bickerstaffe" were published.

James Watson, who had previously reprinted the London Tatler in Edinburgh, began his own Tatler there on 13 January 1711, with "Donald Macstaff of the North" replacing Isaac Bickerstaffe.

Three months after the original Tatler was first published, an unknown woman writer using the pen name "Mrs. Crackenthorpe" published what was called the Female Tatler. Scholars from the 1960s to the 1990s thought the anonymous woman might have been Delarivier Manley, but she was subsequently ruled out as author and the woman remains unknown. However, its run was much shorter: the magazine was published thrice weekly and ran for less than a year, from 8 July 1709 to 31 March 1710. The London Tatler and the Northern Tatler were later 18th-century imitations. The Tatler Reviv'd ran for 17 issues from October 1727 to January 1728; another publication of the same name had six issues in March 1750.

On 4 September 1830, Leigh Hunt launched The Tatler: A Daily Journal of Literature and the Stage. He edited it until 13 February 1832, and others continued it until 20 October 1832.

In July 1901, Clement Shorter, the publisher of The Sphere, introduced a magazine called Tatler, named after Steele's periodical. After several mergers and name changes it remains in print, now owned by Condé Nast Publications.

== See also ==
- List of 18th-century British periodicals
- List of 18th-century British periodicals for women

== Bibliography ==
=== Editions ===
- Ross, Angus (ed.) Selections from The Tatler and The Spectator (Harmondsworth: Penguin, 1982)ISBN 978-0140432985. Edited with an introduction and notes. Out of print.

=== Further reading ===
- "The Story of Tatler: A 300-year frolic through Tatler's history, from coffee-house tri-weekly to glossy monthly". Tatler: 71–114. November 2009.
- Henry W. Kent (1903). "Tatler". Bibliographical Notes on One Hundred Books Famous in English Literature. NY: Grolier Club.
- "Contributors to the Tatler, Spectator, and Guardian periodicals". Oxford Dictionary of National Biography. January 2022. doi:10.1093/odnb/9780198614128.013.105462.
