= The Universal Magazine of Knowledge and Pleasure =

British periodical (London, 1747–1814)

- Frontispiece from Series 2, Volume XCV (July 1794). The whole issue is available in DjVu format on Wikimedia Commons.
- Frequency: Monthly
- Publisher: John Hinton
- First issue: 1747
- Final issue Number: 1814; Series 2, volume 21
- Country: England
- Language: English

The Universal Magazine of Knowledge and Pleasure was a periodical published in London in the period 1747–1814 by John Hinton and W. Bent. It advertised itself as dealing with "Letters, Debates, Essays, Tales, Poetry, History, Biography, Antiquities, Voyages, Travels, Astronomy, Geography, Mathematics, Mechanics, Architecture, Philosophy, Medicine, Chemistry, Husbandry, Gardening and other Arts and Sciences; which may render it Instructive and Entertaining. To which will be added An Impartial Account of Books in several Languages, And of the state of Learning in Europe; also Of the New Theatrical Entertainments." The magazine was published under Royal Licence according to an Act of Parliament obtained by Hinton.

== See also ==
- The Universal Magazine (1900 monthly)
- List of 18th-century British periodicals

== Sources ==
- Catalog Record: The Universal magazine of knowledge and pleasure | HathiTrust Digital Library. HathiTrust.
- "The Universal Magazine of Knowledge and Pleasure". 2. Vol. XCV. London: James Hinton. 1794.
