= Mary Pilkington =

English novelist and poet (1761–1839)

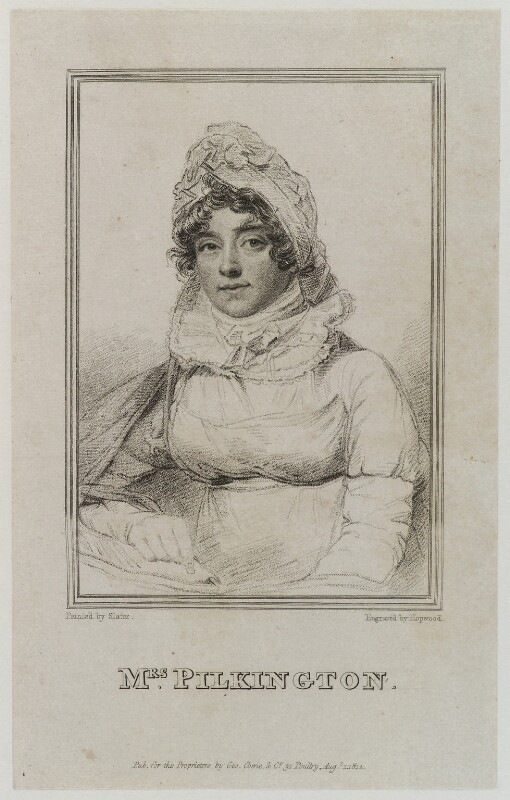
Portrait of Mary Pilkington by James Hopwood Sr, 1812 (NPG CC BY-NC-ND 3.0)

Mary Pilkington (born Mary Susanna Hopkins, 1761–1839) was an English novelist and poet. Many of her over forty novels were written for children.

== Biography ==
Pilkington was born in Cambridge, England. Her father died when she was 15 years old and she went to live with her grandfather. The man who had taken over her father's medical practice eventually became her husband in 1786. While he was away working as a naval surgeon, she took work as a governess.

Pilkington's portrait, painted by Joseph Slater Jr., is held by the Royal Collection Trust. An engraving of her by James Hopwood the Elder is held by the National Portrait Gallery, London, and another by Isaac Slater is held by the Victoria and Albert Museum.

She published over forty novels in the years leading up to 1825, many of them for children. She also wrote for periodicals, notably The Lady's Monthly Museum — which she left over poor compensation — and The Lady's Magazine.

== Selected works ==
- Delia, a pathetic and interesting tale (1790)
- Rosina (1793)
- Miscellaneous Poems (1796)
- Edward Barnard; or, merit exalted (1797)
- The Subterranean Cavern (1798)
- Tales Of The Cottage Or, Stories Moral and Amusing (1798)
- The Accusing Spirit (1802)
- Marvellous Adventures; or, the Vicissitudes of a Cat (1802)
- Memoirs of Celebrated Female Characters, who Have Distinguished Themselves by Their Talents and Virtues in Every Age and Nation, Containing the Most Extensive Collection of Illustrious Examples of Feminine Excellence Ever Published, in which the Virtuous and the Vicious are Painted in Their True Colours, by Mrs. Pilkington (1804)
- Crimes and Characters (1805)
- Ellen (1807)
- Sinclair (1809)
- Parental Care Producing Practical Virtue (1810)
- Celebrity (1815)
