= List of 18th-century journals =

This list of 18th-century journals covers published academic journals from a variety of fields, that were current and printed between 1700 and 1799. It also includes journals that, although initially published before 1700, were current and in print during that century as well. Note that a number of personal books and publications were also titled as "journals"; unless notable, these have been excluded.

== Formal published subject-related journals by subject ==
=== Natural sciences ===
Name	Subject area and type	Date (from)	Date (to)	Founded/printed by	Notes					
Journal für die Botanik ["Journal of Botany"]	Botany (Germany)	1799								
Allgemeines Journal der Chemie ["General Journal of Chemistry"]	Chemistry (Germany)	1798		Aleksandr Ivanovich Sherer, Leipzig		The London Medical Journal: By a Society of Physicians	Medicine (UK)	1781	Society of Physicians in London, "Printed by W[illiam]. Richardson and sold by J. Murray, no 32, Fleet-street"	"Original from Oxford University"
Parisian Chirurgical [Surgical Journal	Medicine (France)	1794		Pierre-Joseph Desault	"Original from Oxford University"					
A Journal of Natural Philosophy, Chemistry and the Arts	William Nicholson	1797		For G. G. and J. Robinson [etc.]						

=== Philosophy, logic, and mathematics ===
Name	Subject area and type	Date (from)	Date (to)	Founded/printed by	Notes
Philosophical Transactions of the Royal Society	Philosophy			The Royal Society	One of the first two peer reviewed journals.

=== Literature ===
Name	Subject area and type	Date (from)	Date (to)	Founded/printed by	Notes
The Monthly Review or Literary Journal		1774		"By Several Hands"	Oxford University?
A Literary journal [edited by J.P. Droz]		1746			

=== Religious and spiritual ===
Name	Subject area and type	Date (from)	Date (to)	Founded/printed by	Notes
The journal of a two months tour: with a view of promoting religion among the frontier inhabitants of Pennsylvania, and of introducing Christianity among the Indians to the westward of the Alegh-geny mountains.	Christianity (evangelism)	1768		By ?Charles Beatty, printed in London, for W. Davenhill [etc.]	
Journal of the Meetings and Convention of the Protestant Episcopal Church in the Diocese of Pennsylvania	Christianity (USA)	17		Episcopal Church/Diocese of Pennsylvania	
The Christian journal, or Common incidents spiritual instructors	Christianity	1792		Author: John Brown	
The Rev. Mr. John Wesley's Journal	Christianity (USA)	1979		Author: John Wesley	University of Michigan

=== Governmental and other public inquiries ===
Name	Subject area and type	Date (from)	Date (to)	Founded/printed by	Notes
Executive Journal of the Northwest Territory	Official journal (Ohio)	1788	1803		"The Executive Journal of the Northwest Territory. In it are recorded all of the official acts and communiques of the governor, Arthur St. Clair, and the secretary, Winthrop Sargent. Singly and individually, it is the most important historical manuscript dealing with the Northwest Territory from its inception in 1788 to its demise with the creation of the state of Ohio." Held at the Library of the Ohio State Museum.
A Journal of the Session: Containing the Decisions of the Lords of Council	Law (Scottish Court of Session)	1705	1713	Pub. 1714	
Journal of the Illinois General Assembly, House of Representatives	Illinois	1798			
The London journal	?UK Political journal	1720?			No. 76 was in January 1720, unclear when this journal ran from/to.
The Journal of the House of Burgesses.	[Virginia General Assembly]	1758			
Journal: Georgia Constitutional Convention	Georgia	1798			
Journal of proceedings, Maryland (Colony) Council	Maryland	1756			
Journal of the Indian Roads Congress	Public inquiry (India)	1792		M.K. Chatterjee, for the Indian Roads Congress	

== Biographical, diarist, and personal journals ==
=== Historical incidents ===
Name	Author	Date (from)	Date (to)	Founded/printed by	Notes
Brief Journal of the Taking of Cape Breton	"L.G."	1745?		Published 1745	
The Journal of Major George Washington (1754)	George Washington	1753	1754		The carrying of a letter from the governor of Virginia to the French commander of the forts recently built on the headwaters of the Ohio River in northwestern Pennsylvania.
An Historical Journal of the Transactions at Port Jackson and Norfolk Island	John Hunter, Philip Gidley King, Arthur Phillip	1793		Printed for John Stockdale, Piccadilly	
An historical journal of the campaigns in North-America, for the years 1757, 1758, 1759, and 1760 : containing the most remarkable occurrences of that period, particularly the two sieges of Quebec, &c. &c.	Captain John Knox	1769			
A journal of the siege of Quebec		1760			
A Journal of the Most Remarkable Occurrences that Took Place in Rome: Upon the Subversion of the Ecclesiastical Government in 1798	Richard Duppa	1799		G.G. and J. Robinson, Paternoster Row	New York public library
The History of the Revolutions in the Empire of Morocco, Upon the Death of the Late Emperor Muley Ishmael	Capt. John Braithwaite, accompanying John Russel, the Consul-General.	1729			
An Authentic Journal of the Siege of the Havana	"An Officer"	1762			Original is at Goldsmiths' Library, University of London
A Journal of the Expedition to Carthagena, with Notes	?Tobias Smollett and/or ? General Wentworth	1744		For J.Roberts, a contributor to the journal.	"Sometimes erroneously attributed ... Doubtfully assigned to Smollett"
A journal of what happened at Genoa, and in its territories [1746 'revolution']		1747		Translated from French for George Straham, London.	
A circumstantial journal of the blockade and siege of Gibraltar 1779–1783	Samuel Ancell	1793 (4th Ed.)		Printed by A. Edwards	
A journal of the plague year being observations or memorials, of the most remarkable occurrences, as well publick as private, which happened in London during the last great visitation in 1665	Daniel Defoe	1722			

=== Travel and exploration ===
Name	Subject area and type	Date (from)	Date (to)	Founded/printed by	Notes
A Journal from Grand Mount Sinai to Cairo and back again; Translated from a Manuscript, written by the Prefect of Egypt in company with the Missionaries of propaganda fide at Greater Cairo; To which are added some Remarks on the origin of Hierogliphics and the Mythology of the ancient Heathens	Robert Clayton	1753?		Published 1753	
Journal of the Ship London, Captain Walter Hues, along the North Coast of Magindanao, October 1764	Alexander Dalrymple	1764		Published 1781	
Journal of the Schooner Cuddalore through the Strait of Sapy, and on the South Coast of Man[-]e[-]rye, in February, March, and April 1761	Alexander Dalrymple	1761		Published 1793	
A Journal, of the Rev. Dr. Coke's Fourth Tour on the Continent of America	Travel (America)	1792?		Published 1792	printed by G. Paramore, sold by G. Whitfield, apparently via Methodist organizations
Captain Bilton's Journal of his unfortunate voyage from Lisbon to Virginia in the year 1707 giving an account of the miraculous preservation of himself and nine other persons. At length they were cast upon the cost of Anguilla, a small island...	Travel	1707		By Thomas Bilton, published A. Bettesworth and E. Curll, London, 1715	
A Journal of the Last Voyage Perform'd by Monsr. de la Sale, to the Gulph of Mexico, to Find Out the Mouth of the Missisipi.				By Henri Joutel, printed 1714	Last voyage of René-Robert Cavelier, Sieur de La Salle
Journal of a Tour to North Carolina by William Attmore, 1787	Travel (North Carolina)	1787		By William Attmore and Lida Tunstall Rodman.	Published by North Carolina Historical Society.
The Journal of an Excursion to the United States of North America in the Summer of 1794	Travel (North America)	1794		Henry Wansey	Published 1796
A Journal of a Voyage to the South Seas, in His Majesty's Ship	Travel	1768	1771	By Sydney Parkinson	Journal of captain Cooks first voyage, pub. 1773
A Description of East-Florida with a Journal, Kept by John Bartram	Travel (Florida)	1769		sold by W. Nicoll; and T. Jefferies	By William Stork. First edition (London, 1766) published under title: An account of East-Florida
A Journal of Eight Days Journey from Portsmouth to Kingston Upon Thames	Travel (UK)	1756		By Jonas Hanway, printed by H. Woodfall	
The History of a Voyage to the Malouine (or Falkland) Islands ... With An Account of the Patagonians.	Travel (Falkland Islands)	1763		Originally published by Don Pernety in French. Translated and printed for T. Jeffreys, London.	"Malouine" is similar to the Argentine name "Islas Malvinas"
Journal d'un voyage à la Louisiane, fait en 1720 ["Journal of a voyage to Louisiana made in 1720"]	Travel (France)	1768		By Vallette Laudun, also states "By M***, Captain of the King's vessel"	
An account of Corsica, the journal of a tour to that island; and memoirs of Pasquale Paoli	James Boswell	1768		Printed by R. and A. Foulis for E. and C. Dilly	
The Journal of a Voyage to Lisbon	Travel	1755			By Henry Fielding, re Viscount Henry St John Bolingbroke, printed for A. Millar.
Histoire et description generale de la Nouvelle France avec le Journal historique d'un voyage fait par ordre du roi dans l'Amérique Septentrionnale. ["Visit to New France – ie, the Eastern half of North America – by order of the King"]		1744		?by Pierre-François-Xavier de Charlevoix; Jacques Nicolas Bellin	
Journal of a Voyage to New South Wales		1790			By John White, printed for J. Debrett
Journal of Captain Cook's Last Voyage to the Pacific Ocean		1781			
Journal of a Voyage from London to Savannah in Georgia	Travel	1738		Author: George Whitefield, publisher: J Hutton	

=== General ===
Name	Author	Date (from)	Date (to)	Founded/printed by	Notes
A Journal of the Captivity and Sufferings of John Foss: Several Years a Prisoner at Algiers	John Foss	1798			
Journal of William Maclay, United States Senator from Pennsylvania, 1789–1791	William Maclay	1789	1791		"Senate sessions were closed to the public until 1795, his is one of the few accounts of Senate floor activity in the early Congresses."
A Genuine and True Journal of the Most Miraculous Escape of the Young Chevalier	John Burton	1749			Relates to Jacobite rising of 1745
A Journal of the Life, Travels, and Labours in the Work of the Ministry of John Griffith	John Griffith	1779		Printed and sold by James Phillips, Lombard Street, London	New York public library, foreword by Joseph Docwra
A Journal During a Residence in France, from the Beginning of August, to the Middle of December 1792, to which is added an account of the most remarkable things that happened at Paris from that time to the death of the late King of France.	John Moore M.D.	1793			G.G. and J. Robinson, Paternoster Row, London
A collection of the works of William Penn To which is prefixed a journal of his life, with many original letters and papers not before published	William Penn	1726		J. Sowle, London	
Journals of Christopher French		1756	1778		Military journal
A journal of the life of Thomas Story containing an account of his remarkable convincement of and embracing the principles of truth as held by the people called Quakers and also of his travels and labours in the service of the gospel, with many other occurrences and observations.	Thomas Story	1747		An influential British Quaker. Printed as part of his legacy, by his estate. Printer: I. Thompson	
A Two Years Journal in New-York: And Part of Its Territories in America	Charles Wolley	1701		"Printed for John Wyat at the Rose in St. Paul's Churchyard and Eben Tracy, at the Three Bibles on London Bridge"	
Journal of Washington Irving	Washington Irving	1737			
A Journal of Occurrences at the Temple, During the Confinement of Louis XVI	M. Clery (King's valet)	1798		Translated by Robert Charles Dallas, London and printed by Baylis of Greville Street	New York public library
Secret Journal of a Self-observer	Johann Caspar Lavater	1770; 1795			Christianity
The Life of Samuel Johnson, LL. D.	James Boswell	1786		G. Bell and sons	
(Select Letters Taken from) Fog's Weekly Journal	Charles Molloy	1732		"Printed and sold by the booksellers of London and Westminster"	

== Other and unsorted journals ==
Name	Subject area and type	Date (from)	Date (to)	Founded/printed by	Notes
The Endeavour Journal of Sir Joseph Banks, 1768–1771	Travel	1768	1771		Manuscript held at the State Library of NSW.
Portion of an incomplete journal	unknown	1788		By Thomas Edgar	
Journal historique et littéraire	Humanities	1789		Printed in Maastricht and Liège by F. Cavelier [etc.]	Harvard college library
Journal encyclopédique par une societé de gens de lettres ["Encyclopedic Journal of a Society of Lettered Persons"]	unknown	1756			Harvard University Library
Discovery: The Popular Journal of Knowledge	unknown	1763		Author: Frances Chamberlaine Sheridan	
The Political Magazine and Parliamentary, Naval, Military, and Literary Journal		1780			
Journal des Sçavans (or "Journal de Savants" – roughly, "Journal of the Learned")	type unknown, (France)				One of the first two peer reviewed journals. May also have been called "Journal de Savants" "Savant" (Old French): a learned person, or one who has been admitted to membership in a scholarly field. "Sçavans" seems to be an archaic spelling of that word.

== See also ==
- Academic journals
- Lists of academic journals
- List of 18th-century British periodicals
- List of early-modern journals

== Literature ==
- Kronick. History of Scientific and Technical Periodicals. — c. 500 journals, categorized with brief descriptions.
