= The Lady's Monthly Museum =

Defunct British women monthly magazine

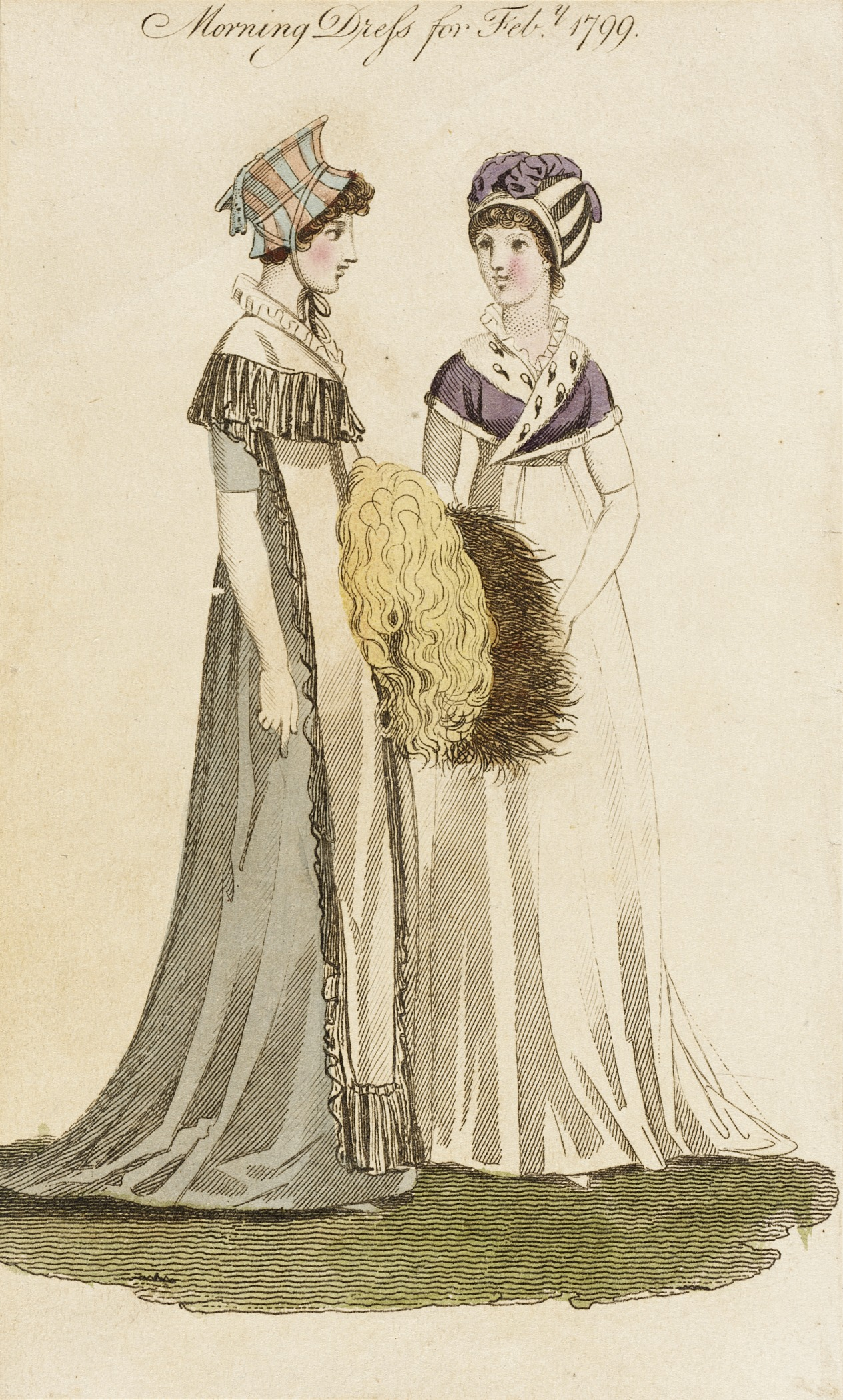
Fashion plate entitled Morning Dress for Febr. 1799

The Lady's Monthly Museum; Or, Polite Repository of Amusement and Instruction (Note: From 1814 the title of the magazine was The Ladies' Monthly Museum; this was later shortened to The Ladies' Museum.) was an English monthly women's magazine published between 1798 and 1832.

== History ==
The Lady's Magazine, a women's magazine founded in 1770 with a "pseudo-genteel and sentimental emphasis", encouraged successors. The Lady's Monthly Museum; Or, Polite Repository of Amusement and Instruction was started in 1798 as one of the more successful of the group. The magazine was published by Vernor and Hood, and was one of the era's more popular publications.

It merged with The Lady's Magazine in 1832, becoming known as The Lady's Magazine and Museum of the Belles Lettres, Fine Arts, Music, Drama, Fashions, etc., and finally ceased publication in 1847.

== Content ==
The magazine positioned itself to appeal directly to women. It featured articles on fashion, biographies and portraits of aristocratic persons of interest, essays, and poems. Serialised stories also appeared in the Lady's Monthly Museum, making the publication one of the first to publish novels before they became available as books.

The Lady's Monthly Museum claimed in 1798 that its contributors were "Ladies of established Reputation in the literary Circles". However, contributing writers were poorly paid for their efforts. One of its regular writers, Mary Pilkington, often asked for increased compensation and eventually left the magazine in favour of the Lady's Magazine. Pilkington, who mainly contributed anonymously, wrote poetry, stories, biographies, and social gossip for the magazine, and also did editorial work. From 1830, Charles Robert Forrester was also a contributor.

== See also ==
- List of 18th-century British periodicals
- List of 18th-century British periodicals for women
- List of 19th-century British periodicals
