= The Female Spectator =

Defunct women periodical

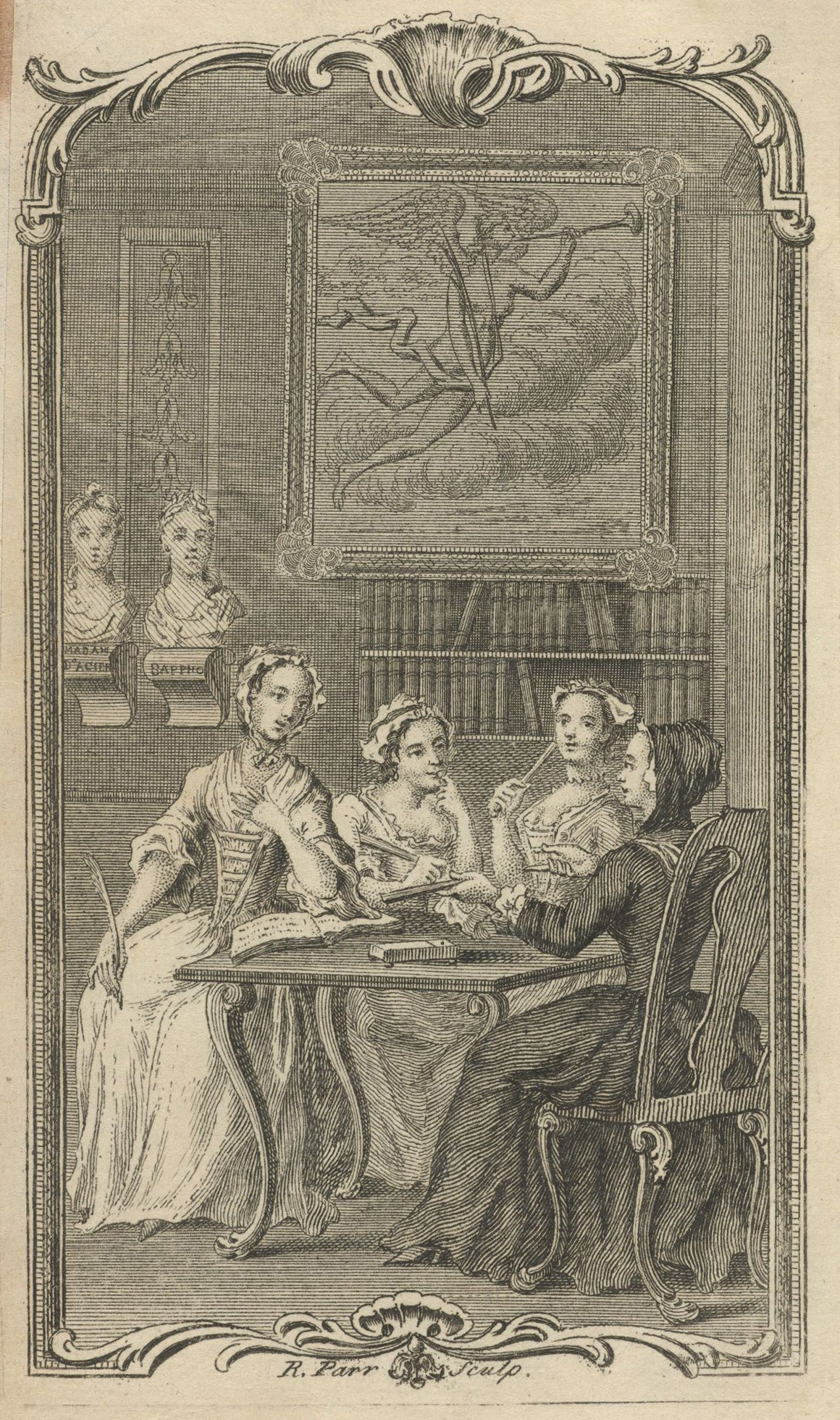
- Frontispiece to The Female Spectator (London, 1746)
- Editor: Eliza Haywood
- Categories: Women's periodical
- Frequency: monthly
- Format: book
- Publisher: T. Gardner, at Cowley's Head opposite St. Clement's Church in the Strand
- First issue: April 24, 1744; 280 years ago
- Final issue Number: May 31, 1746; 24

The Female Spectator, published by Eliza Haywood between 1744 and 1746, is generally considered to be the first periodical in English written by women for women.

== Publication ==
The Female Spectator was launched anonymously in April 1744 and was published on a monthly basis. It eventually ran for 24 numbers, a longer run than most periodicals of the time. Eliza Haywood has long been identified as the author, though she never acknowledged her involvement. Thomas Gardner was the publisher and printer.

== Audience and reception ==
The primary audience for Haywood's journal was women – the newly affluent middle classes, and the upper strata with leisure time and money. She wrote that she wanted the periodical to be "as universally read as possible", and a poem by an anonymous male author in The Gentleman's Magazine in December 1744 praising The Female Spectator suggests that it was indeed read by at least some men.

== Contents ==
The Female Spectator is loosely modelled on The Spectator by Joseph Addison and Richard Steele. The new publication differs from its inspiration principally in that it speaks exclusively from a female viewpoint. To do this it employs four characters: the eponymous "Female Spectator," who shares the benefits of her lifetime experience, and her three assistants, each of whom represents an idealized woman at a different stage of life: Euphrosine, the beautiful unmarried daughter of a wealthy merchant; the happily married and sophisticated Mira; and a "Widow of Quality."

Each issue of the journal was originally published in book format and usually covers a single topic or narrative in the form of essays or stories which frequently revolve around "love and marriage", with an emphasis on moral attitudes. The essays use a straightforward structure of premise, development, and conclusion, with few digressions. The sentences are leisurely and well-balanced, with simple but forceful language.

The explicit moral instruction is bolstered with exemplary or cautionary anecdotes that demonstrate an "appropriate" point of view of different situations and warn of the consequences of risky behaviours. One such anecdote features a young woman who disguises herself as a boy in order to follow her lover into the army; another tells of a young woman, raised in ignorance, who elopes with the first man to court her; and a third describes a woman, dissatisfied with marriage, whose love affair yields an illegitimate child. Over the run of the journal such stories numbered sixty, some detailed enough to be likened to "miniature novels".

Haywood defended the omission of current affairs by pointing out these were adequately represented in the newspapers of the day. She also argued the need for women to be more widely educated. She devoted one series of issues, for example, to the study of Baconian empiricism and the natural world and by so doing is said to have fostered women's interest in the microscope.

== See also ==
- List of 18th-century British periodicals
- List of 18th-century British periodicals for women

== External sites ==
- The Female Spectator archives at the Internet Archive
- The Female Spectator in libraries (WorldCat catalog)
