= The Lady's Museum =

Defunct British monthly magazine

The Lady's Museum was a monthly magazine published in the United Kingdom between 1760 and 1761.

The magazine was edited and largely—if not entirely—written by British novelist and translator Charlotte Lennox. Like most eighteenth-century periodicals, The Lady’s Museum presented itself as a means of educating and informing its readers. In this, it resembles an earlier women’s periodical, The Female Spectator (1744-6), by Eliza Haywood.

== See also ==
- List of 18th-century British periodicals
- List of 18th-century British periodicals for women
