= John Bew (bookseller) =

John Bew (fl. 1774 – 12 April 1793) was a bookseller, stationer, printer and publisher at 28–29 Paternoster Row in London. He was the publisher of The Political Magazine from 1780 to March 1785, when it was taken over by John Murray. The Political Magazine was a journal written for an audience of informed gentlemen, and often included supplementary maps engraved by John Lodge. Bew eventually went bankrupt on 27 November 1790.
