= Bell's Weekly Messenger =

British Sunday newspaper

- Type: weekly
- Format: quarto
- Founder: John Bell
- Founded: 1796
- Ceased publication: 1896
- Headquarters: London

Bell's Weekly Messenger was a British Sunday newspaper that began publication on 1 May 1796, under proprietorship of John Bell. Initially a Sunday paper, from 1799 the London edition was reprinted on Monday for nationwide distribution. By 1803, it was selling 6,000 copies a week, at sixpence a copy. In 1799 there was even an augmented reprint of the previous year's editions, under the title Bell's Annual Messenger, printed for international distribution under the auspices of the East India Company.

By 1805, Bells weekly messenger was selling 8000 copies per week.

From its inception in 1799 the Monday edition carried information on agricultural markets in the U.K. Although Bell's Weekly Messenger began as a general weekly, after it acquired in 1832 Evans and Ruffy's Farmers' Journal it gave extensive coverage to agricultural affairs and was for many years the leading agricultural newspaper in the U.K.

The newspaper continued under the title Bell's Weekly Messenger until March 1896, after which it was continued as Country Sport.

In 1832 the first recorded British newspaper cartoon was published in Bell's New Weekly Messenger.
