= The Monthly Review (London) =

English periodical

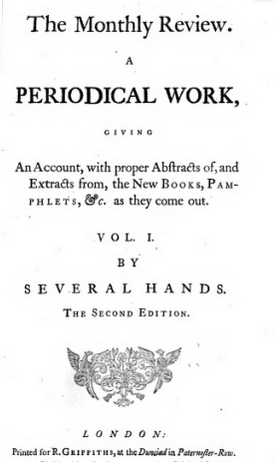
Title page of the first issue (2nd edition) of The Monthly Review, May 1749

The Monthly Review (1749–1845) was an English periodical founded by Ralph Griffiths, a Nonconformist bookseller. The first periodical in England to offer reviews, it featured the novelist and poet Oliver Goldsmith as an early contributor. Griffiths himself, and likely his wife Isabella Griffiths, contributed review articles to the periodical. Later contributors included James Ralph, Dr. Charles Burney, John Cleland, Theophilus Cibber, James Grainger, Anna Letitia Barbauld, Elizabeth Moody, and Tobias Smollett—who would go on to establish the Monthly's competitor in 1756, The Critical Review. William Kenrick, the "superlative scoundrel", was editor from 1759 to 1766.

In 1758, the periodical reviewed James Ralph’s pamphlet The Case of Authors, characterising it as a just appraisal of the difficulties faced by professional authors.

== Publishing history of The Monthly Review ==
- Volumes 1–81, May 1749 – December 1789;
- {2d ser.} v. 1–108, January 1790 – November 1825;
- new {3d} ser., v. 1–15, January 1826 – December 1830;
- new {4th} ser., v. 1–45, January 1831 – December 1844. (The four-month volumes in this series are numbered I, II, and III on the title page, restarting at I each January, but some libraries and indexes number the volumes continuously from 1831.)

Many libraries have incorrectly cataloged the periodical as the London Monthly Review.

== Format ==
Each issue of the Monthly was divided into two sections: longer reviews of several pages were in the front section, short reviews of lesser works were featured in the back Monthly Catalogue, divided by genre headings.

== See also ==
- List of nineteenth-century British periodicals
- List of eighteenth-century British periodicals
- List of eighteenth century journals
