= Thomas Bellamy (writer) =

English tradesman and writer (1745–1800)

Thomas Bellamy (1745–1800) was an English tradesman and writer.

== Life ==
Bellamy was born at Kingston-on-Thames, served an apprenticeship to a hosier in Newgate Street, London, and went into business on his own account. After 20 years he became a clerk in a bookseller's in Paternoster Row, leaving after a disagreement.

In 1787 Bellamy started the General Magazine and Impartial Review, which was published for some months. Another venture was Bellamy's Picturesque Magazine and Literary Museum, which contained engraved portraits of living persons, with some account of their lives; but it was a commercial failure. Later he set up The Monthly Mirror, which was mainly concerned with the stage, and established a circulating library.

On the death of his mother Bellamy came into property, and retired from business. Seized with sudden illness he died, after four days' suffering, on 29 August 1800.

== Other works ==
Some of the verse pieces in Bellamy's Miscellanies were dated 1763. He wrote:

- The Benevolent Planters, a dramatic piece performed at the Haymarket Theatre in 1789, and printed the same year.
- Sadaski, or the Wandering Penitent, 2 vols., 1798.
- Lessons from Life, or Home Scenes.
- The Beggar Boy, a novel in three volumes, published posthumously in 1801, with a biographical memoir of the author by Villa-Real Gooch.

In 1794 Bellamy collected in two volumes moral tales which he had written for the General Magazine, adding verses, unpublished tales, and a life of William Parsons the comedian. These Miscellanies in Prose and Verse were dedicated to Charles Dibdin; with whom the author later quarrelled.
