= Political Magazine =

The Political Magazine and Parliamentary, Naval, Military, and Literary Journal was a monthly magazine published in London from 1780 to 1791. From January 1780 to March 1785 it was published by the bookseller John Bew. It was then published by John Murray until October 1789, when the publisher R. Butters took over.

Much of the magazine was given over to the political events of the time. The issue of June 1780, for example, was almost completely devoted to the Gordon Riots. The Political Magazine represented both sides of the debate on the slave trade.

The magazine also published engravings of maps, particularly by the engraver John Lodge (1735–1796).

The introduction to the first issue reads:

"The intelligent reader will readily observe, that this Preliminary number has been chiefly dedicated to state the grounds of the present war, as given by the several belligerent powers themselves, in order to begin the Political Magazine with more propriety, than the commencing it abruptly with the occurrences of the month. The Declarations of Congress are the first in the order of time; then follow the ministerial and opposition opinions, and those that have been deemed impartial, closed with Lord Chatham's dying speech. Dr. Franklin's Memorial naturally succeeds these, as it engaged the French Court in the war. The French Declaration, with his Majesty's Message to both Houses of Parliament, and the Addresses of both Houses, come next in course. Then the French Manifesto, and Spanish Rescript or declaration of War, are given. After these the King's Speech, the Addresses of both Houses, a sketch of the debates of the present Session, and the Relief granted to Ireland, bring us up to the point of our commencement. An exact description of the Fortress and Rock of Gibraltar, with Annals of the twelve sieges that strong fortress has sustained, are next given. Then the pleasing detail of our late successes at Omoa, and Savannah, the surprise of Fort Stanwix (where Col. St. Leger failed in 1777) of which the particulars are not yet arrived, the captures of the Dutch fleet in the Channel, and the French fleet in the West Indies, close this Publication."
