= The Watchman (periodical) =

The Watchman was a short-lived periodical established and edited by Samuel Taylor Coleridge in 1796. The first number was promised for 5 February 1796 but actually appeared on 1 March. Published by Coleridge himself, it was printed at Bristol by Nathaniel Biggs, and appeared every eight days to avoid tax. Publication ceased with the tenth number (published 13 May 1796). The publication contained essays, poems, news stories, reports on Parliamentary debates, and book reviews.

The volumes all contain explicitly political material such as the ‘Introductory Essay’, (a history of ‘the diffusion of truth’); the ‘Essay on Fasts’, (attacking the alliance of church and state power); two anti-Godwinian items, ‘Modern Patriotism’ and ‘To Gaius Gracchus’; ‘To the Editor of the Watchman’ (reporting the trials of friends of freedom John Gale Jones and John Binns); and an extract from Coleridge’s lecture ‘On the Slave Trade’.
