= Mrs Elizabeth Moody with her Sons Samuel and Thomas =

c. 1780 painting by Thomas Gainsborough

Mrs Elizabeth Moody with her sons Samuel and Thoma
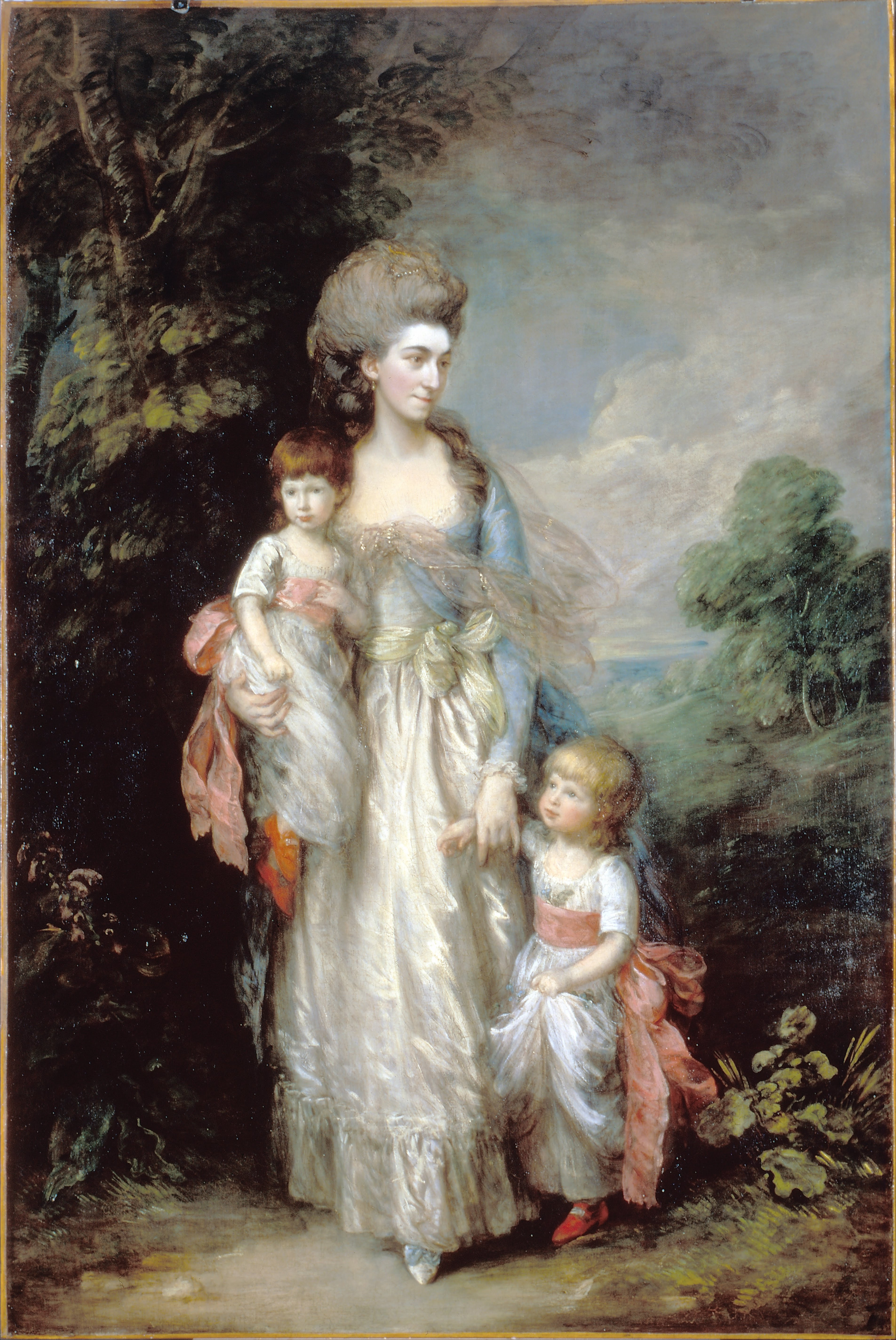
- Artist: Thomas Gainsborough
- Year: c. 1779
- Medium: Oil on canvas
- Dimensions: 2,340 mm (92 in) × 1,542 mm (60.7 in)
- Location: Dulwich Picture Gallery
- Accession no.: DPG316
- Identifiers: Art UK artwork ID: mrs-elizabeth-moody-17561782-with-her-sons-samuel-and-thomas-200070

Mrs Elizabeth Moody with her Sons Samuel and Thomas is an oil on canvas family portrait by Thomas Gainsborough, from c. 1779-1785. It was originally painted as a single portrait of Mrs Moody around 1779–80 as a commission from her new husband Samuel Moody. She died in 1782 and the children are thought to have been added in 1784 or 1785. The painting was given to the Dulwich Picture Gallery in 1831 by Thomas Moody, one of the sons shown in the work, possibly to prevent it from passing to his step-mother, with whom he was not on friendly terms.
