= The Monthly Mirror =

The Monthly Mirror was an English literary periodical, published from 1795 to 1811, founded by Thomas Bellamy, and later jointly owned by Thomas Hill and John Litchfield. It was published by Vernor & Hood from the second half of 1798.

The Mirror concentrated on theatre, in London and the provinces. The first editor for Hill was Edward Du Bois. From 1812 it was merged into the Theatrical Inquisitor.

== Contributors ==
- Thomas Batchelor
- Sir John Carr
- Leigh Hunt
- Capel Lofft
- Eliza Kirkham Mathews
- Thomas Park
- Horatio Smith
- James Smith
- John Taylor, writing opera "memoirs and sketches"
- Henry Kirke White
- Samuel Whyte
- Tate Wilkinson
