= The Rambler =

Periodical by Samuel Johnson

The Rambler was a periodical (strictly, a series of short papers) by Samuel Johnson.

== Description ==
The Rambler was published on Tuesdays and Saturdays from 1750 to 1752 and totals 208 articles. It was Johnson's most consistent and sustained work in the English language. Though The Rambler was superficially similar to earlier publications such as The Spectator and The Tatler, Johnson made his periodical unique by using a style of prose which differed from that of the time period. The most popular publications of the day were written in the common or colloquial language of the people whereas The Rambler was written in elevated prose. The Rambler discussed subjects such as morality, literature, society, politics, and religion. Johnson included quotes and ideas in his publication from Renaissance humanists such as Desiderius Erasmus and René Descartes. His writings in The Rambler are considered to be neoclassical.

== Purpose ==
The Rambler was written primarily for the newfound, rising middle-class of the 18th century, who sought social fluency within aristocratic social circles. It was especially targeted to the middle-class audience that were increasingly marrying into aristocratic families in order to create socio-economic alliances, but did not possess the social and intellectual tools to integrate into those higher social circles which required great understanding of subjects, as listed above in the Description. Copies of The Rambler were written in essay form and were made cheaply available to the middle-class. In his fourth section of The Rambler (31 March 1750), Johnson points out that he would like to "Join both profit and delight in one" in the prelude; that is, provide intellectual profit and literary delight to those who read his work. This desire to "join both profit and delight" streams throughout the publications, and is particularly resonant of Classical literary design. The majority of the subject matter in The Rambler focused more on moral than social issues. In this sense, Johnson's writings were didactic, although he maintains an explorative attitude rather than a strictly instructive voice.

== Comparison with The Spectator ==
As its author lamented in its final essay, "I have never been much a favourite to the publick," the publication was not an immediate success. Perhaps this was due to Johnson's departure from The Spectator, which could be considered his precedent. The latter was a periodical published from 1711 to 1712 by Joseph Addison and Richard Steele, popular for its light treatment of elevated subjects by "enliven[ing] morality with wit." In tone and subject matter, The Rambler was both lengthier and more serious than its popular ancestor in the genre. It also had a strong element of didacticism. The Rambler contained more sermon-like reflective essays and lacked the Spectator's "dramatic" qualities.

There were many, however, who religiously read and appreciated the publication. In his biography of Johnson, James Boswell quotes one contemporary review of The Rambler by Bonnell Thornton and George Colman, "May the publick favours crown his merits, and may not the English, under the auspicious reign of George the Second, neglect a man, who, had he lived in the first century, would have been one of the greatest favourites of Augustus." The Rambler was widely respected for the quality and power of the writing and the masterful use of language and rhetoric.

== Revival ==
In 1901, Herbert Vivian produced a magazine called "The Rambler" that he intended as a revival of Johnson's periodical. The revived magazine only lasted until 1902.
