= The Universal Magazine (1900 monthly) =

- Frequency: Monthly
- First issue: February 1900
- Final issue: January 1902
- Country: UK
- Based in: London
- Language: English

The Universal Magazine was a short-lived, London-based monthly magazine, which published non-fiction articles of general interest and some short fiction.

There were 21 issues from February 1900 to January 1902, but with no issues for 3 months (April, August, and September) in the year 1900. Each copy of the magazine was sold for six pence.

The magazine was published for 12 issues from February 1900 to April 1901 (with 3 months omitted) under the title The Universal Magazine, for 7 issues from May 1901 to November 1901 under the title The Universal and Ludgate Magazine, and then for 2 issues from December 1901 to January 1902 under the title The Universal Magazine. From February 1900 to October 1900, the editor was Alexis Maria de Beck, and from November 1900 to January 1902, the editor was Raymond Blathwayt (1855–1935). From February 1900 to October 1900, the publisher was Horace Marshall & Son and from November 1900 to November 1901 the publisher was A.M. de Beck Ltd. In early 1901, de Beck bought out and merged The Ludgate Monthly into The Universal Magazine, but the new magazine lost money every month and de Beck was given a liquidation order in December 1901.

The inaugural issue included contributions from Marie Corelli, Sir George Douglas, Yves Guyot and Coulson Kernahan. Émile Zola contributed to the May 1901 issue.
