= The Bee (magazine) =

18th century British literary magazine

The Bee was a short-lived British literary magazine started by Oliver Goldsmith on 6 October 1759. In it he published "Citizen of the World" and many of his best essays. The last edition of the magazine was published on 24 November 1759.
