= Elizabeth Moody (poet) =

British poet and literary critic (1737–1814)

- Born: Elizabeth Greenly; 1737 Kingston upon Thames, England
- Died: 1814 (aged 76–77)
- Occupation: Poet; literary critic
- Language: English
- Notable works: Poetical Trifles (1798)
- Spouse: Christopher Lake Moody

Elizabeth Moody (1737 Kingston upon Thames – 1814) was a British poet and literary critic.

== Life ==
Elizabeth Greenly was the daughter of a wealthy lawyer, who died when she was 13, but left a legacy for her family. A book-lover from an early age, she was well read in English, French, and Italian literature. For many years she privately circulated verse in a circle that included Edward Lovibond and George Hardinge. She remained unmarried until the age of 40 when, in 1777, she wed the dissenting clergyman Christopher Lake Moody (1753–1915), vicar of Turnham Green.

== Literary Accomplishments ==
Moody reviewed 29 books for Monthly Review, a job she likely came to through her husband, as Christopher reviewed for them as well. The Moody's were dissenting Presbyterians, as was the Monthly Review's editor, Ralph Griffiths, and this is how they came to know him both personally and professionally. She also reviewed books for the weekly newspaper, The St. James's Chronicle in which her husband owned a share. She and her husband also contributed poetry to the weekly St. James's Chronicle.

== Works ==
- Poetical Trifles, 1798, printed by H. Baldwin and Son; for T. Cadell, Jun. and W. Davies, 1798'

=== Anthologies ===
- Margaret R. Higonnet, ed. (1996). British women poets of the 19th century. Meridian. ISBN 978-0-452-01161-8.
- Emma Donoghue, ed. (1997). What Sappho would have said: four centuries of love poems between women. Hamish Hamilton. ISBN 978-0-241-13682-9.
- Paula R. Feldman, ed. (1997). British women poets of the Romantic era: an anthology. Johns Hopkins University Press.
