= The Dream (short story) =

1832 short story by Mary Shelley

- Short story by Mary Shelley
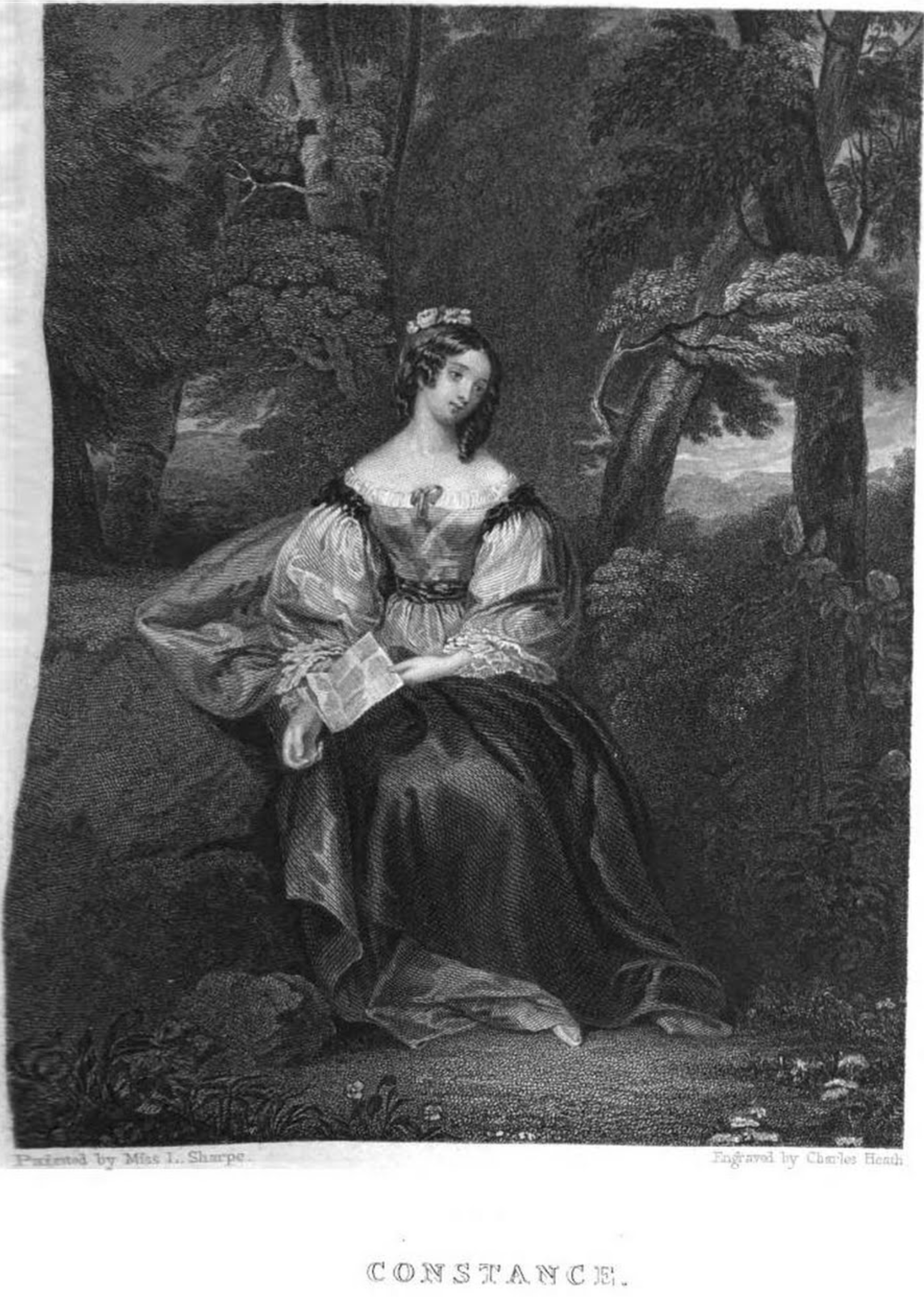
- Constance, engraving by Charles Heath from the painting by Louisa Sharpe from The Keepsake for 1832, story The Dream
- Country: United Kingdom
- Language: English
- Genre: Gothic

Publication
- Published in: The Keepsake
- Publisher: Longman, Rees, Orme, Brown, and Green
- Media type: Print, literary annual
- Publication date: 1831

"The Dream" is a Gothic tale written by Mary Shelley and first published in late-1831 in The Keepsake. Set in France around the turn of the seventeenth century, it is the story of a young woman named Constance who is in love with Gaspar, the son of her father's enemy. Because their fathers killed each other in battle, Constance feels she cannot marry Gaspar, even though he loves her too. She spends a night on St. Catherine's Couch, a ledge of rock overlooking a river, in the hope that St. Catherine will offer her guidance in her dreams. She does, and Constance and Gaspar are married the next day.

== Summary ==
Countess Constance de Villeneuve is a recently orphaned heiress living in Nantes, France, who is in love with the son of her father's enemy, Gaspar de Vaudemont. Their fathers killed each other in battle, and Constance feels torn between her love for Gaspar and her duty to her late father. Gaspar and King Henry IV of France, a friend of her father's, try to reassure Constance that it would be wrong to sacrifice her happiness, but she remains unsure.

Unable to make a decision about the marriage, Constance decides to spend a night sleeping on St. Catherine's Couch, a ledge of rock overlooking the Loire river. Legend holds that St. Catherine will appear to anyone who sleeps on the rock and offer them guidance. Gaspar hears about this plan and, terrified for Constance's safety, keeps watch underneath the ledge all night. Constance dreams about Gaspar's death in battle, and the agony she feels about the idea of losing him convinces her that marrying him is the right thing to do. Just before she wakes up, she begins to toss and turn, and Gaspar rushes to her side. She awakens in Gaspar's arms, which have kept her from falling to her death in the river. She tells him about her dream and her decision to marry him, and they are married later that day in the chapel dedicated to St. Catherine.

== Publication history ==
"The Dream" was first published in late-1831 in The Keepsake, a British literary annual. It was accompanied by an engraved illustration called Constance, painted by Louisa Sharpe and engraved by Charles Heath. It has since been reprinted in several anthologies. A fair-copy holograph manuscript of the tale is held in The Carl H. Pforzheimer Library in New York, which shows that Shelley edited the original version of the tale to better fit the illustration.

== Themes and influences ==
"The Dream" is one of several Gothic tales that Mary Shelley published in The Keepsake. Others include "Ferdinando Eboli" (1829), "The Evil Eye" (1830), "Transformation" (1831), "The Invisible Girl" (1832), and "The Mortal Immortal" (1834). "The Dream" is more ambiguously Gothic than some of Shelley's other tales, but engages with common Gothic themes such as thwarted love, messages in dreams, and visions of ghosts.

The tale may have been influenced by John Keats' poem "The Eve of St. Agnes", which is also the story of a young woman turning to a supernatural power for romantic advice.

In terms of form, "The Dream" is a variation on the Gothic fragment, exemplified by Anna Letitia Aiken's "Sir Bertrand: A Fragment" (1773). Although it is often categorized as a short story, that form was not named until the 1880s in Britain. It is more accurately classified as a Gothic tale, a story about an experience of the strange or supernatural, often narrated in the first or third person.

== External references ==
- An omnibus collection of Shelley's short fiction, including The Dream at Standard Ebooks
- Tales and Stories at Project Gutenberg
- "The Dream" title listing at the Internet Speculative Fiction Database
