= The Evil Eye (1830 short fiction) =

Work by Mary Shelley

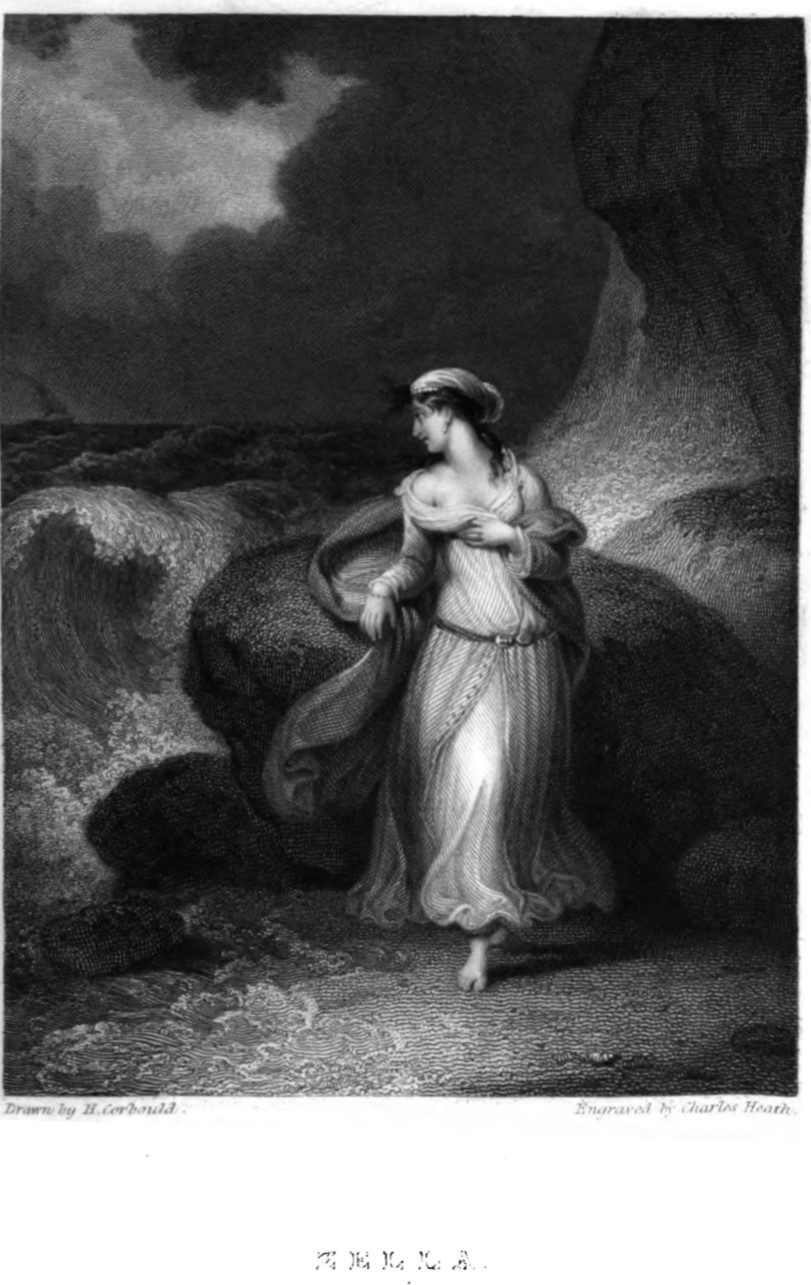
"Zella", from The Keepsake for 1830.

"The Evil Eye" is a piece of short fiction written by Mary Shelley and published in The Keepsake for 1830. The tale is set in Greece and is about a man known as Dmitri of the Evil Eye. Dmitri's wife was murdered and his daughter abducted many years before the story begins. Dmitri's friend Katusthius Ziani enlists him to help recover his rightful inheritance, and during their journey they abduct a boy whom Dmitri discovers to be his grandson.

== Summary ==
The tale centres on a man known as Dmitri of the Evil Eye, an Arnaoot (Albanian) Klepht leader who lives in Yannina, Greece. Many years before the story begins, Dmitri's Sciote wife was murdered and his daughter kidnapped by Mainote pirates while he is away from home. Dmitri searched for his daughter for three years before giving up hope, gaining a scar across his eyebrow and cheek in a battle with Mainotes. This scar and his grief and anger transformed his features and character such that he is rumoured to possess the power of the Evil Eye.

When the story begins, Dmitri's friend and sworn brother, the Moreot Katusthius Ziani, visits Dmitri to ask for help recovering his father's fortune. Katusthius had joined a crew of Barbary corsairs after they boarded his merchant ship, and after leaving them had wandered through Europe before returning to his father's home in Corinth. When he returned, he discovered that his father, thinking him dead, had willed his fortune to another son, Cyril. Cyril shared the inheritance, but Katusthius is determined to regain it all, and asks Dmitri to help.

Katusthius visits Cyril and his wife, Zella, and asks them to accompany him to Naples to see him off on a long journey. While they are away from home, Dmitri kidnaps their three-year-old son, Constans. Cyril is enraged when he finds out and goes in search of his son. He discovers that Dmitri is the man responsible, and that Katusthius is involved as well. Cyril enlists his father-in-law, Camaraz, a Mainote leader, to help him find Constans, and leaves Zella at home mourning her son and fearing for her husband's life.

Dmitri becomes attached to and protective of Constans during their travels, but Katusthius plots against the child. One night, while Dmitri is sleeping, Katusthius takes the boy, conceals him in a nearby Caloyer monastery, and recruits Sagori villagers to ostensibly protect the boy and monastery from Dmitri. Dmitri and his band attack the monastery and retrieve Constans. As they escape through the mountains, they encounter Katusthius and his party, as well as Cyril and Camaraz, who have been tracking the kidnappers. Camaraz declares himself a Mainote and the grandfather of the abducted boy, and Dmitri's feelings of affection for Constans transform instantly to revulsion for Mainotes. He threatens to kill Constans, but before he is able to, Camaraz explains that Constans is not a Mainote, as his mother was a Sciote, kidnapped as a young girl. Dmitri realizes that Constans is the son of his lost daughter, Zella, and returns home with Cyril to be reunited with her and his newfound grandson.

== Publication history ==
"The Evil Eye" was first published in The Keepsake for 1830, a British literary annual, credited to "The Author of Frankenstein". It was accompanied by an illustration entitled Zella, which was painted by Henry Corbould and engraved by Charles Heath. It has since appeared in one collection of Shelley's work and of supernatural stories, but is not widely read or studied.

== Themes and influences ==
"The Evil Eye" is one of several tales Shelley published in The Keepsake. Others include "Ferdinando Eboli" (1829), "Transformation" (1831), "The Invisible Girl" (1832), "The Dream" (1833), and "The Mortal Immortal" (1834).

"The Evil Eye" employs many motifs common in Gothic fiction, including abduction, revenge, and the curse of the Evil Eye. The tale displays the aesthetics of Romantic Orientalism, and can be categorized as an Oriental tale alongside William Beckford's novel Vathek (1786), Lord Byron's poems The Giaour and Childe Harold's Pilgrimage (1812–1818), Thomas Hope's Anastasius (1819), and Prosper Mérimée's La Guzla (1827). Unlike other Gothic tales by Shelley, such as "Transformation" and "The Mortal Immortal," and her Gothic novel Frankenstein, "The Evil Eye" does not involve supernatural phenomena.

The tale may have been inspired by La Guzla, which Shelley reviewed in 1829.

"The Evil Eye" is a variation on the Gothic fragment, a form exemplified by Anna Letitia Aiken's "Sir Bertrand: A Fragment" (1773). Although it is now categorized as a short story, that form was not named until the 1880s in Britain. It is more accurately classified as a Gothic tale, a story about an experience of the strange or supernatural, often narrated in the first or third person.
