= Transformation (short story) =

1831 short story by Mary Shelley

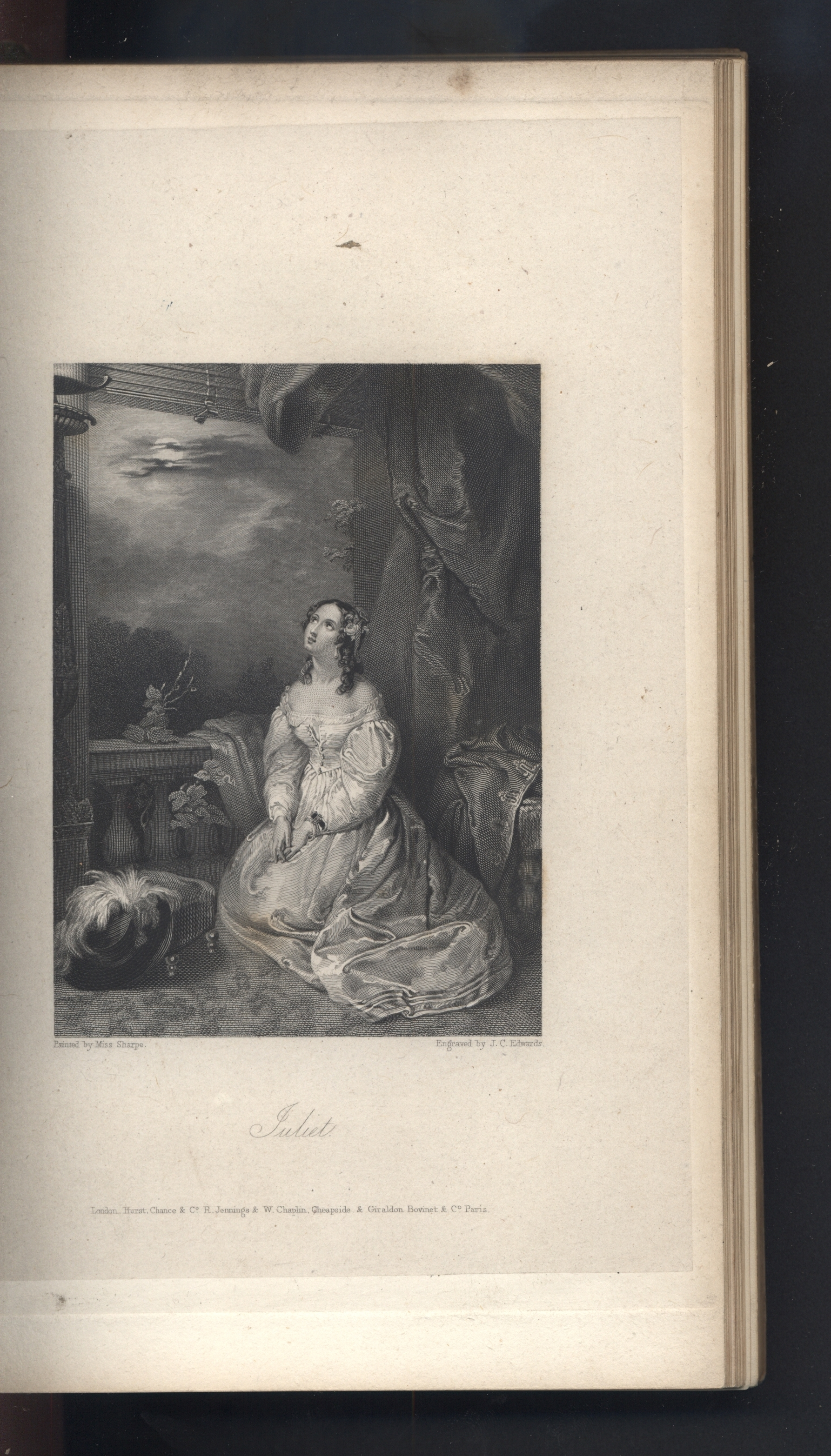
Juliet, the illustration for "Transformation" in The Keepsake for 1831. Painted by Louisa Sharpe and engraved by J. C. Edwards. From the University of Victoria Libraries Special Collections, call number AY13 K4 1831.

Transformation is a short story written by Mary Shelley and first published in 1831 for The Keepsake. Guido, the narrator, tells the story of his encounter with a strange, misshapen creature when he was a young man living in Genoa, Italy, around the turn of the fifteenth century. He makes a deal with the creature to exchange bodies, but the creature does not reappear at the appointed time to take his own body back. Guido discovers that the creature is pretending to be him, kills it and therefore 'himself', and eventually awakens in his own body.

== Summary ==
Guido il Cortese describes how he is sometimes compelled to tell the story of a strange encounter he had with a mysterious creature many years before, when Guido was a young man living in Genoa, Italy. In those days, Guido says, he was reckless and profligate, determined to live a life of pleasure, especially after his father's death left him the master of his family fortune. He became engaged to his childhood playmate Juliet, the beautiful and virtuous daughter of his father's lifelong friend Torella. But before they married, Guido journeyed to Paris, where he squandered his family fortune. Paris was a place of dissipation at this time, during the reign of Charles VI, but the political turmoil that followed the murder of the Duke of Orleans changed this. Guido returned to Genoa, to Torella's house and to Juliet, but Torella told him that by squandering his family fortune, Guido had voided the contract of marriage. Torella, who viewed Guido as a son, offered to settle a fortune on him on the condition that he adhere to certain restrictions. Guido refused to be controlled in this way and left Torella's villa. He attempted to abduct Juliet twice, once with her father, but was unsuccessful. After the second attempt, Guido was banished from Genoa and refused Torella's offers of help.

Guido was penniless and alone, and wandered along the seashore in despair. He imagined his revenge on Torella and the people of Genoa, but knew he was completely powerless without fortune. Suddenly, a storm appeared over the water, and Guido watched in horror as a ship was wrecked on the nearby rocks. He could hear the sailors' agony but was powerless to help them. But he saw a strange figure floating to shore, and discovered it to be a misshapen creature—possibly human—riding on a chest.

The creature reached the shore and frightened Guido with his blasphemy and horrible appearance. Guido told him a little of his story, and the creature encouraged him to take revenge. When Guido lamented that his lack of wealth prevented this, the creature offered a deal: he would have Guido's body for three days in exchange for the chest he was riding, which was full of treasure. Guido would inhabit the creature's body in the meantime, and would be supplied with food and water while he waited for the creature to return. Guido was horrified, but tempted by the promise of wealth, and agreed. The creature performed the necessary ritual, which included the exchange of blood, and Guido lost consciousness. When he awoke, he was in the body of the creature. He immediately regretted his avarice, but decided to wait the three days for the creature to return. The three days passed, but the creature did not return, and after waiting three more days in despair, Guido in desperation decided to pursue him back to Genoa. He did this with great difficulty in the strange body, travelling at night to avoid being seen. He eventually arrived at Torella's villa, only to discover that the impostor had assumed Guido's rightful place in Torella's family and would shortly be married to Juliet. Enraged, and fearing for Juliet if the marriage were to take place, Guido attacked the creature. They were both severely wounded in the fight, the creature fatally. Guido awakened in his own body once again, and once he recovered, he and Juliet were married. They lived a long, happy life together, but Guido never fully recovers from his injuries, and is haunted by his memory of the encounter with the strange creature.

== Publication history ==
"Transformation" was first published in The Keepsake for 1831, a British literary annual. It was accompanied by an engraving called Juliet, from a painting by Louisa Sharpe (attributed to "Miss Sharpe"), engraved by J. C. Edwards. It has been collected in several anthologies since.

It was loosely adapted and modernized as the "Cold Feet" segment in Ron Ford's 1998 direct-to-video anthology film, Things 3: Old Things.

== Themes and influences ==
"Transformation" is one of several Gothic tales that Mary Shelley published in The Keepsake. Others include "Ferdinando Eboli" (1829), "The Evil Eye" (1830), "The Invisible Girl" (1832), "The Dream" (1833), and "The Mortal Immortal" (1834). Like "Ferdinando Eboli" and Shelley's novel Frankenstein, "Transformation" explores the Gothic motif of the double, or doppelgänger. This motif is common in nineteenth-century Gothic fiction, including, for example, James Hogg's The Private Memoirs and Confessions of a Justified Sinner (1824), Robert Louis Stevenson's Strange Case of Dr. Jekyll and Mr. Hyde (1886), and Oscar Wilde's The Picture of Dorian Gray (1890).

"Transformation" may have been influenced by Lord Byron's unfinished drama The Deformed Transformed (1824), which Mary Shelley transcribed between 1822 and 1823.

In terms of form, "Transformation" is a variation on the Gothic fragment, exemplified by Anna Letitia Aiken's "Sir Bertrand: A Fragment" (1773). Although it is often categorized as a short story, that form was not named until the 1880s in Britain. It is more accurately classified as a Gothic tale, a story about an experience of the strange or supernatural, often narrated in the first or third person.
