= The Invisible Girl (story) =

1833 short story by Mary Shelley

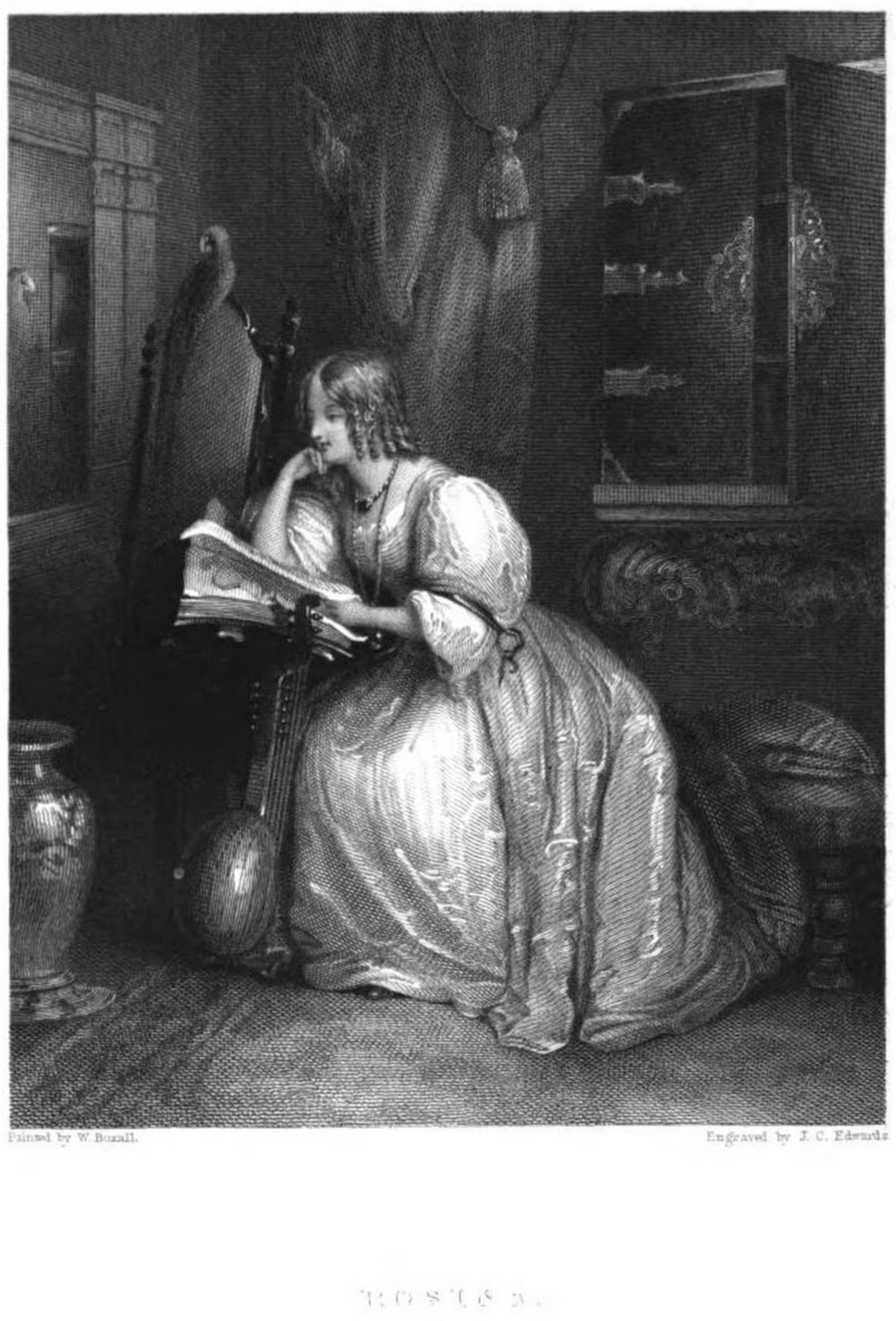
"Rosina", illustration for "The Invisible Girl", in The Keepsake for 1833, painted by William Boxall and engraved by J. C. Edwards.

The Invisible Girl is a Gothic tale written by Mary Shelley and first published in The Keepsake for 1833. The tale is set in Wales, and tells the story of a young woman named Rosina, who lives with her guardian, Sir Peter Vernon, and is secretly engaged to his son, Henry. Henry is away from home when their relationship is discovered, and Sir Peter casts Rosina out of the house. Sir Peter regrets his harshness and searches for her, but assumes she is dead when she cannot be found. Henry returns home to the news of Rosina's death and is heartbroken. He joins the search for her body, and the villagers tell him about the Invisible Girl, a ghostly figure who wanders the woods at night. Henry finds Rosina hiding in a remote ruin and discovers that she is really the Invisible Girl. Sir Peter forgives them for their secret engagement, and they are married.

== Summary ==
The narrator tells the story of how he became lost during a walk along the coast of Wales and sought shelter in what looked like a ruined tower, thanks to the hospitality of its housekeeper. He is surprised at the comfortable furnishings within the tower, and is intrigued by a painting of a lovely young woman hung above the fireplace, entitled The Invisible Girl. The housekeeper tells him the following story. Many years before, a distraught man had arrived in the area looking for sailors to take him to a town about 15 miles away. The villagers recognized him as Henry Vernon, the son of Sir Peter Vernon, whose family owned an estate not far from the town Henry was headed to. The weather was uncertain, but two sailors accepted Henry's generous terms and agreed to take him to his destination. On the way, they were caught in a storm, and barely made it to shore before their boat crashed on some rocks, thanks to the guidance of a faint light in a nearby tower. They sought shelter in the tower, but it was uninhabited. The sailors tell Henry that the tower is the home of a ghost named the Invisible Girl, who is often seen at night wandering the shore in search of her lost lover. The three men spend the night in the tower, but Henry is too miserable to sleep, consumed by grief for his own lost love.

Henry was secretly engaged to a young woman named Rosina, an orphan and a ward of his family. They grew up together and were very much in love, but Henry knew his father would not approve his marriage to a poor orphan, and so convinced Rosina to keep the engagement secret. They were happy for a while, since Sir Peter's blindness made it easy for them to conceal their relationship from him. But Sir Peter's recently widowed sister Mrs. Bainbridge arrived to live with them, and she suspected the affair. She convinced her brother to send Henry away and marry off Rosina in his absence. When Rosina refused to marry another, their engagement was discovered, and although Sir Peter loved his son and Rosina, he was angry at their deception. Spurred on by the spiteful Mrs. Bainbridge, he banished Rosina from his house. She left that night, but her absence was not discovered until the morning, and she could not be found. Sir Peter searched desperately for her, bitterly regretting his cruelty and furious at his sister for inciting his anger so unjustly. When Rosina cannot be found, they assume she drowned in a nearby river. They retire to a different estate and send word to Henry of Rosina's death. Henry rushes home only to discover that her body has not been recovered, and determines to journey back to Wales to recover it himself. This is why he has hired the sailors to take him to his family's estate on the coast of Wales.

In the morning, Henry and the two sailors seek food and provisions at a nearby fisherman's cottage. They ask about the legend of the Invisible Girl, but the fisherman's family have nothing to tell them. Henry returns to search the tower while his companions repair their boat, but finds no sign of habitation other than a single lady's shoe. The shoe reminds him of Rosina, and he determines to return it to its owner. The three men arrange to sleep at the fisherman's cottage, but Henry cannot sleep, and is surprised to see a light in the tower. He returns there, planning to surprise the inhabitant and return the shoe. The inhabitant flees as soon as he enters, but he explains his purpose, and is astounded to hear Rosina's voice reply. The lovers are overjoyed to be reunited, and Rosina tells Henry that she took shelter in the tower after her banishment from the Vernon estate, and is still terrified of Sir Peter and his curses upon them. Henry tells her of his father's change of heart, and after a few months of recovery, she and Henry are married. They furnished the tower and hung the painting of Rosina to remember her sad persecution and the story of their happy reunion.

== Publication history ==
"The Invisible Girl" was first published in The Keepsake for 1833, a British literary annual. It was accompanied by an engraved illustration entitled Rosina, which was painted by William Boxall and engraved by J. C. Edwards. It was reprinted in a few anthologies, but is largely unread and unstudied.

== Themes and influences ==
"The Invisible Girl" is one of several Gothic tales that Mary Shelley published in The Keepsake. Others include "Ferdinando Eboli" (1829), "The Evil Eye" (1830), "Transformation" (1831), "The Dream" (1833), and "The Mortal Immortal" (1834). Although the tale does not involve real supernatural phenomena, it includes a number of motifs characteristic of Gothic fiction, including a tyrannical guardian, a persecuted heroine, and a ghost story. It employs the technique of the explained supernatural characteristic of Ann Radcliffe.

Like several other works by Shelley, including Frankenstein, "The Invisible Girl" employs a frame narrative. In terms of form, "The Invisible Girl" is a variation on the Gothic fragment, exemplified by Anna Letitia Aikin's "Sir Bertrand: A Fragment" (1773). Although it is often categorized as a short story, that form was not named until the 1880s in Britain. It is more accurately classified as a Gothic tale, a story about an experience of the strange or supernatural, often narrated in the first or third person.
