= Ferdinando Eboli =

- Short story by Mary Shelley
- Country: United Kingdom
- Language: English
- Genre: Gothic fiction

Publication
- Published in: The Keepsake for 1829
- Publication type: Literary annual
- Publisher: Hurst, Chance, & Co.
- Media type: Print
- Publication date: 1829

Ferdinando Eboli is a Gothic tale written by Mary Shelley and published in The Keepsake for 1829. It is set in Italy during the Napoleonic Wars and tells the story of an Italian man named Count Ferdinando Eboli whose identity is stolen by his illegitimate older brother.

== Summary ==
Count Ferdinando Eboli is about to leave his home in Naples to fight for his king, King Murat (Gioacchino), but before he leaves he pays a farewell visit to his fiancée Adalinda, and her father, the Marchese Spina. After he leaves, Adalinda is musing over her love for him when she hears a noise beneath her window, and is surprised to see Ferdinand there. He climbs up into her room and asks for a lock of her hair, but he cuts his hand while snipping it. She binds his hand with one of her ribbons, and he departs.

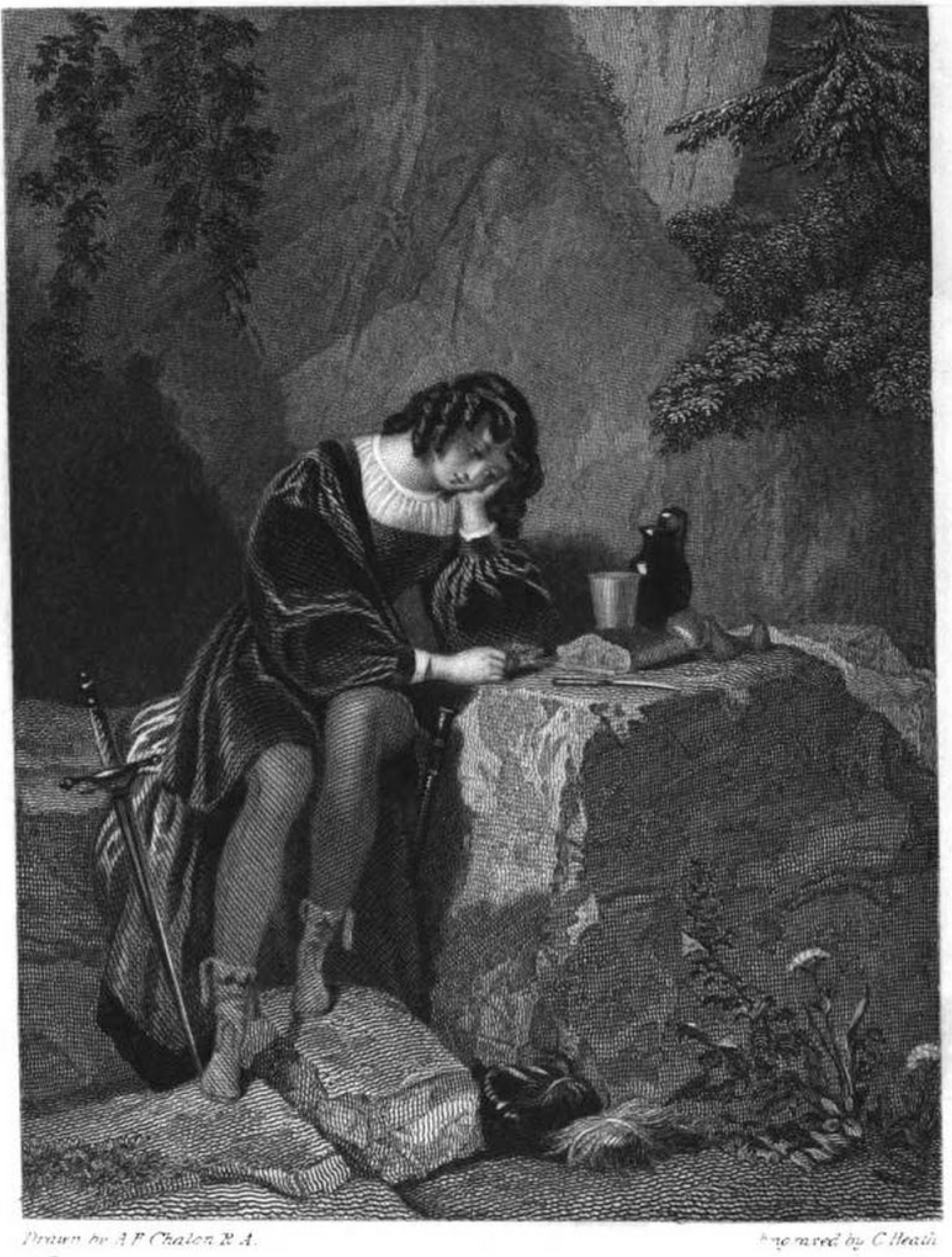
"Adalinda", engraving from The Keepsake for 1829, illustrating Ferdinando Eboli. The heroine, dressed as a page, escapes her captors in a bandits' cave.

Ferdinand is stationed in northern Italy and is sent on an important mission by Gioacchino. While performing this mission, Ferdinand is ambushed and taken to a remote shack, where he is given peasant's clothes in exchange for his own and is tied up and left by his attackers. He is freed by two peasant children and returns to headquarters, ashamed to have failed in his task. When he arrives, he is arrested as a spy, and when he is brought before the king he confronts a man who looks exactly like him and is wearing his stolen clothes. This impostor claims to be the real Ferdinand, and has been welcomed back as a hero for completing the dangerous mission. The king banishes Ferdinand, who returns to the Marchese's home. The Marchese recognizes him in spite of his altered appearance, but the imposter soon arrives and confounds the Marchese. He asks Adalinda to identify her betrothed, and she identifies the man with the cut on his hand.

Ferdinand, with nowhere else to go, returns to his estate, where he is once again met by the impostor. He is arrested and imprisoned. The impostor visits him in jail tells him that he has already married Adalinda, which is a lie. He offers to have him freed if he signs a statement acknowledging the imposter as the true Eboli, but Ferdinand refuses. He is sent away to fulfill his sentence but escapes with a fellow prisoner.

While Ferdinand is in jail, the Marchese dies, and Adalinda's marriage to Eboli is therefore delayed. As the weeks pass, Adalinda begins to suspect that the man she identified is not the real Ferdinand. She confronts him, and he reveals the truth, that he is Ferdinand's illegitimate older brother, and was raised by his jilted mother to one day take revenge upon his brother by stealing his identity. He tells Adalinda that she cannot escape, since he has replaced all of her attendants with his own people. She does manage to escape, however, by disguising herself as a page, but is forced to take shelter in what appears to be a banditto's cave after becoming lost in the woods. Two men appear: Ferdinand and his friend from prison, who have been leading a band of banditti following their escape from prison. One of their men capture the impostor in the wood as he looks for Adalinda.

Ferdinand and Adalinda seek help from Queen Caroline, who helps them bring the impostor before the King, who restores the real Ferdinand to his rights and fortune. He and Adalinda marry, and forgive the impostor, Ludovico. He joins the army and fights with his brother in Moscow, where Ludovico dies of exposure. Ferdinand would have suffered the same fate, but is captured by the enemy and eventually liberated after Napoleon's exile to Elba.

== Publication history ==
"Ferdinando Eboli" was first published in The Keepsake for 1829, a British literary annual. It was accompanied by an engraved illustration entitled Adalinda, painted by Alfred Edward Chalon and engraved by Charles Heath. It was reprinted in several anthologies since, but is not widely read or studied.

The Keepsake for 1829 is notable for its list of contributors, which includes many of the most popular writers and artists of the day, many of whom are canonical Romantic artists.

== Themes and influences ==
"Ferdinando Eboli" is one of several Gothic tales that Mary Shelley published in The Keepsake. Others include "The Evil Eye" (1830), "Transformation" (1831), "The Invisible Girl" (1832), "The Dream" (1833), and "The Mortal Immortal" (1834). The central motif in this tale is the characteristic Gothic motif of the double, or doppelgänger, which Shelley also employs in "Transformation" and her novel Frankenstein. Other examples of nineteenth-century Gothic fiction that employ this motif include James Hogg's The Private Memoirs and Confessions of a Justified Sinner (1824), Robert Louis Stevenson's Strange Case of Dr. Jekyll and Mr. Hyde (1886), and Oscar Wilde's The Picture of Dorian Gray (1890).

"Ferdinando Eboli" is often classified as a short story, but that term was not common in Britain until the 1880s. It is more accurately categorized as a Gothic tale: one that describes a strange or supernatural experience, often by a first- or third-person narrator.
