= The Mortal Immortal =

1833 short story by Mary Shelley

Mary Shelley, painted by Richard Rothwell and shown at the Royal Academy in 1840

"The Mortal Immortal" is a short story from 1833 written by Mary Shelley. It tells the story of a man named Winzy, who drinks an elixir which makes him immortal. At first, immortality appears to promise him eternal tranquility. However, it soon becomes apparent that he is cursed to endure eternal psychological torture, as everything he loves dies around him.

== Summary ==
"The Mortal Immortal" deals with the cursed life of Winzy, a young man who has lived for 323 years. He recollects the events that led to his immortality. Winzy worked for the professor and alchemist Cornelius Agrippa. At first, he did not accept the employment offer made by Agrippa. However, Winzy's love for Bertha, his childhood sweetheart and love of his life, prompted him to accept the offer in hopes that the money he made could be sufficient to give her a comfortable living.

Cornelius Agrippa spent many days working on an elixir. Winzy was not aware of the complete purpose of the elixir, but he chose to drink it when he felt Bertha had left him for Albert Hoffer, a favorite of her protectress. Winzy drinks it in an attempt to cure himself from love. To his surprise, Winzy wakes up the next day rejuvenated, but with no knowledge of what he has consumed, discovering that Bertha is still true to him. Agrippa sets back to work, unsuccessfully, on the elixir once again since Winzy drank half of it and dropped the rest. Five years later Agrippa is on his deathbed and reveals the purpose of the elixir. Winzy has to live with the fact that Bertha is getting older while he continues to look twenty years old. Bertha is confused, but does not know the reason behind Winzy's continual youthful look. She believes that it is a spell that he must break in order for him to get old with her. Winzy confesses the truth and tells Bertha that he must leave her so that she may continue on with her life. Bertha accepts the situation and tells Winzy that she wants to start a new life with him somewhere neither one of them can be recognized.

Winzy and Bertha move to western France to begin their new life. It is here that Winzy witnesses the slow death of Bertha. He cares for her until she perishes. Bertha's death causes him to realize that there will never be another woman that he can love the way that he has loved Bertha. The story ends with Winzy lamenting his condition and deciding to put his immortality to the test by undertaking a dangerous journey.

== Origins ==
The story was commissioned in 1833 for The Keepsake, a prominent literary annual which married short fiction and poetry with high-quality engraved artworks. It was one of a number of similar commissions; Shelley sold twenty-one stories to annuals over a seventeen-year period, with more than half of those in The Keepsake. For this story, Shelley was given an engraving titled Bertha, from a painting by Henry P. Briggs engraved by Frederick Bacon, showing a young man and young woman helping an elderly lady descend a staircase. She chose to write a story based around the idea of an immortal male narrator, seeing his wife both as a young woman and as the old woman she becomes.

"The Mortal Immortal" is considered to be an example of the Godwinian confessional narrative. The story has been linked to St. Leon, a 1799 novel by Shelley's father, William Godwin. Godwin's novel had established the idea of a tragic immortal protagonist, possessed of exceptional powers but unable to use them well. Shelley had developed this theme in Frankenstein (1818). In "The Mortal Immortal", she applied an ironic twist – the protagonist becomes immortal by accident – and played on the ways that the narrator's immortality drove him and his wife apart from society.

Another source can be found in Apuleius' The Golden Ass, a second-century Latin satire, in which a miraculous transformation also relies on an accidental potion; Shelley is known to have translated it, at the instigation of her husband, in 1817.

The title stems from "Endymion", a poem by John Keats.

== Publication history ==
Public domain audiobook version of The Mortal Immortal - 00:45:57 - 24.8MB

The story was originally published in The Keepsake for 1834 (Dec. 1833), a literary annual. It was later republished in 1873, as part of The Casquet of Literature, being a Selection of Prose and Poetry from the Works of the Most Admired Authors, edited by Charles Gibbon, and reappeared in similar editions in 1890, 1891 and 1896, both in London and Philadelphia. During the 1930s, it was published in three separate collections of "thrillers", and in 1974 in the Masterpieces of Science Fiction series. Editions of it were later included in two scholarly collections of Shelley's work, in 1976 and 1990, as well as in a Norton Anthology. In 1996, it was used as the title story in a collected edition of Shelley's supernatural short stories.

The Italian author Iginio Ugo Tarchetti, one of the first Gothic novelists practicing in Italian and a prominent member of the Scapigliatura movement, wrote an Italian version of the story, as Il mortale immortale; later critics have noted that this version bears such a close resemblance to the original that it is in effect an unauthorised and unattributed translation.

A sequel to the story was written by Gary Jennings in 1973, published in Fantasy and Science Fiction as "Ms. Found in an Oxygen Bottle".

== Themes ==
"The Mortal Immortal" is one of several Gothic tales that Shelley published in The Keepsake. Others include "Ferdinando Eboli" (1829), "The Invisible Girl" (1830), "Transformation" (1831), "The Dream" (1832), and "The Evil Eye" (1833).

The story uses themes and motifs common to Romantic Gothic fiction, including immortality and the figure of the Wandering Jew, thwarted love, and alchemy. Its fragmentary form and confessional style are characteristic of this genre and Shelley's other short stories, such as "Transformation". These themes, motifs, and narrative techniques are also evident in Shelley's novels, including Frankenstein.

== Critical response ==
Despite the popularity of The Keepsake and the status of its contributing authors, the fiction and poetry it contains were seen as unimpressive by contemporary reviewers and are still largely disregarded by literary critics today. The Gentleman's Magazine described them as "none of any remarkable interest..." and described the Mortal Immortal itself as "a tissue of monstrous and appalling impossibilities".

Some modern critics have described it, along with the other Keepsake stories, simply as commercial hackwork, while others have seen it as highlighting her "gift for humour", and as a "vigorously inventive" quasi-autobiographical piece.
