= Catharine Day Golland =

British Gothic author (1793–1851)

- Born: 1793; London
- Died: 1851
- Occupation: Writer

Catharine Day Haynes Golland (1793 – 1851) was an English gothic novelist.

Catharine Day Haynes was born in 1793 in London. She married John Golland in 1821.

Her first novel, The Castle of Le Blanc, A Tale, was serialized in The Lady's Magazine from 1816 to 1819 but never published in book form. Its heroine, Clara, moves into the ancestral castle of her new husband, the Marquis le Blanc. An inset story features a heroine who crossdresses as a gambler to win her lover's fortune to prevent it from falling into the hands of his enemies. She went on to write six novels for Minerva Press (later named A. K. Newman & Co.). The Founding of Devonshire; or, Who is She? (1818) features a suffering heroine who eventually marries an aristocrat and regains her parents through a birthmark. Eleanor; or, The Spectre of St. Michael's (1821) is set in Scotland and features a heroine who finds her disgraced mother, who promptly dies. The Ruins of Ruthvale Abbey (1827) features another unjustly suffering heroine, author Momimia Beauville.

Catharine Day Golland died in 1851.

== Bibliography ==
- The Founding of Devonshire; or, Who is She? 5 vols. Minerva Press, 1818
- August and Adelina; or, The Monk of St. Barnardine. 4 vol. Minerva Press, 1819.
- Eleanor; or, The Spectre of St. Michael's, A Romantic Tale. 5 vol. Minerva Press, 1821.
- The Ruins of Ruthvale Abbey. 4 vol. London: A. K. Newman, 1827.
- The Maid of Padua: or, Past Times. A Venetian Tale. 4 vol. London: A. K. Newman, 1835.
- The Witch of Aysgarth. 3 vol. London: A. K. Newman, 1841.
