= Mary Sharpe =

Mary Sharpe may refer to:

- Mary Elizabeth Sharpe (1884–1985), American philanthropist, businesswoman, and self-taught landscape architect
- Mary Ann Sharpe (1802?–1867), British artist

== See also ==
- Mary Sharp (1778–1812), British abolitionist
