= Louisa Sharpe =

English painter

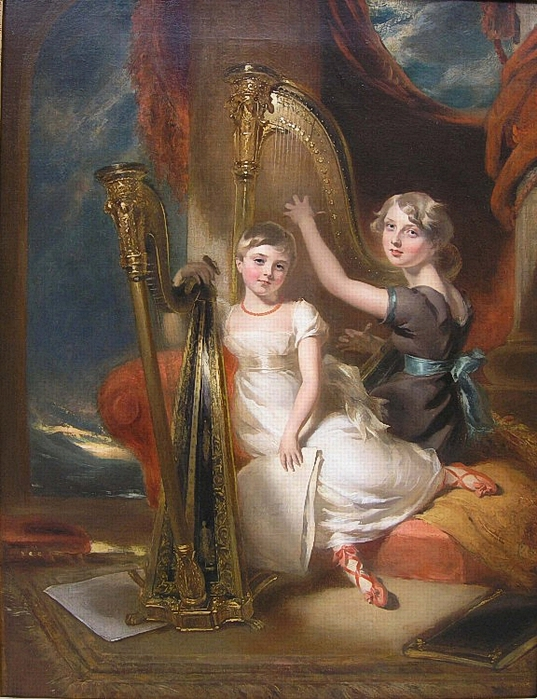
- Portrait of Louisa and her sister Eliza Sharpe by George Henry Harlow
- Born: 1798; Birmingham
- Died: 28 January 1843 (aged 44–45); Dresden

Louisa Sharpe (1798 – 28 January 1843) was a British miniature painter who was one of four gifted sisters

== Life ==
Sharpe was born in Birmingham to Sussanna (born Fairhead?) and an engraver named William Sharpe and she was baptised on 21 August 1798 at St Phillip's church. She had three sisters, Eliza Sharpe, Charlotte Sharpe and Mary Ann Sharpe who all became artists. The parents allowed Louisa and the other daughters to travel to the continent to inspect galleries in France and Germany and each of the daughters was taught to engrave.

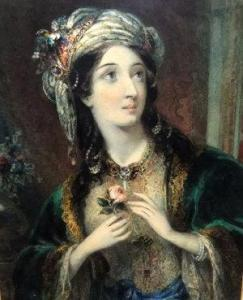
Louisa Sharpe's Portrait of a Turkish lady holding a Rose

William and Sussanna moved the Sharpe family to London in 1816. Whilst she was a child she was painted with her sister Eliza by George Henry Harlow. Sharpe was said to be the most talented of the four female artists in the family. She had nearly thirty paintings accepted at the Royal Academy starting in 1817.

From 1829 Sharpe was elected to the (old) Watercolour Society. She created sentimental and commercial images including poets and people in costume. These highly finished pictures were engraved and appeared in annuals. Her image of "Ellen Strathallan" was engraved in 1829 and appeared in the Forget-Me-Not annual. Her work also appeared in Heath’s ‘Book of Beauty’ and in The Keepsake annual for 1832. Her painting, Do You Remember It?, appeared in the annual, engraved by Charles Heath and with illustrative verse by Letitia Elizabeth Landon. Her painting, "Constance," as engraved by Charles Heath, illustrated Mary Shelley's "The Dream" in The Keepsake for MDCCCXXXII. Her painting, "Flora," as engraved by Francis Engleheart, illustrated Shelley's "The Brother and Sister: An Italian Story" in The Keepsake for MDCCCXXXIII.

Sharpe married Professor Woldemar Seyffarth in 1834 and she moved to live with him in Dresden. Sharpe still painted and her work was exhibited in London as her husband had his own business to conduct in Britain. Anna Brownell Jameson wrote of Louisa and Eliza Sharpe that no man could paint like they did. This was not because their work was so clever but because it was so essentially feminine. Sharpe died in 1843 in Dresden. She had two daughters and one, Agnes Seyffarth exhibited her pictures.
