= John William Wright =

English painter

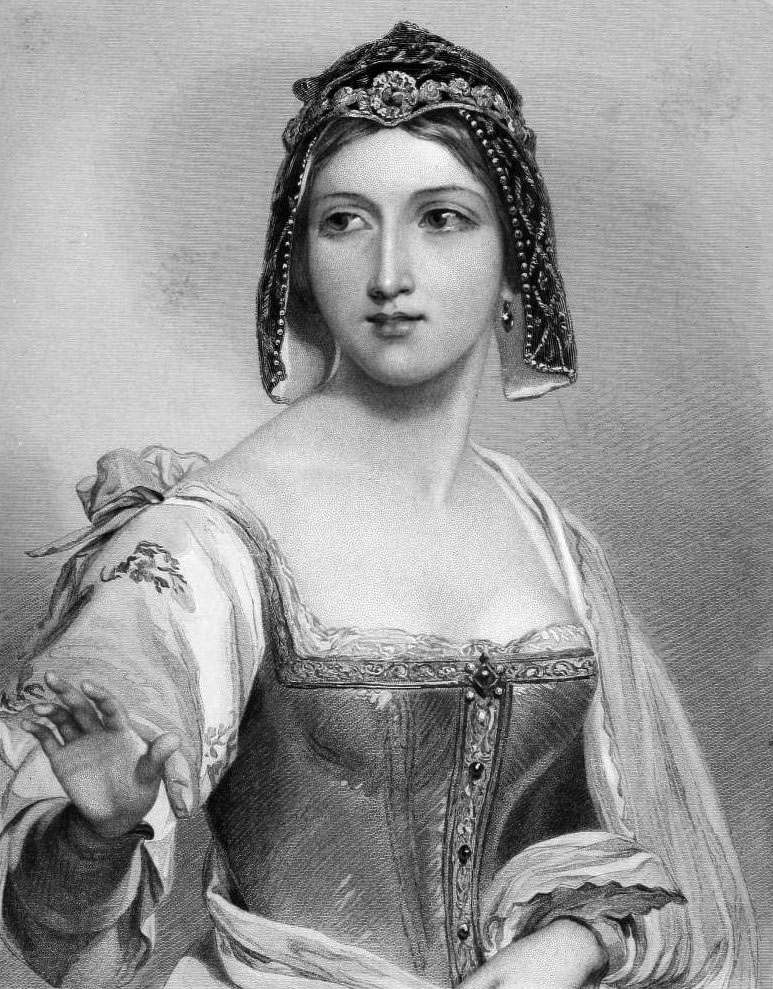
Silvia (engraved by Heath after Wright, 1849 - from "The heroines of Shakespeare")

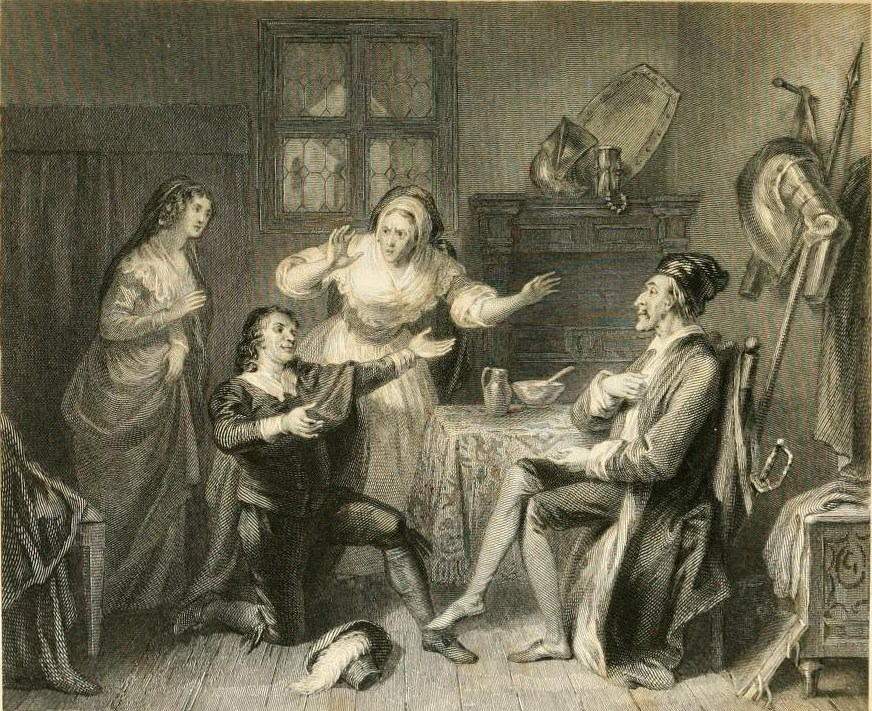
Don Quixote and Samson Carrasco (engraving after Wright, 1834)

John William Wright (1802 – 14 January 1848) was an English genre and portrait watercolour painter and illustrator.

== Life and work ==
Wright was born in London in 1802, the son of John Wright (d. 1820), a miniature painter of repute, acquainted with leading artists of the day such as John Hoppner, Thomas Lawrence and William Owen (1769–1825). His mother, Priscilla (née Guise) was also a good miniaturist, but died when John William was still an infant in 1802. At the age of 10 he was sent to school at Loughborough House in Brixton but had to be withdrawn due to ill-health, which he suffered from throughout his life. He was apprenticed to Thomas Phillips (1770–1845), and from 1825 was a frequent exhibitor at the Royal Academy, mainly of portraits. In 1831 he was elected an associate of the Old Watercolour Society, and in 1842 a full member; in 1844 he succeeded Robert Hills (1769–1844) as secretary.

Wright painted domestic and sentimental subjects in the style then popular, and also historical compositions, notable for their detailed depictions of costumes; the plays of Shakespeare were a frequent source of inspiration. Engravings of his pictures featured in publications such as "The Keepsake", "The Literary Souvenir", and Heath's "Book of Beauty", "The Drawing-room Scrap Book", and "The Female Characters of Shakespeare". His portraits of Lord Tenterden, Bishop Gray, and Bishop Marsh were engraved for Fisher's "National Portrait Gallery".

Wright died at his house in Great Marlborough Street, London, on 14 January 1848, from influenza, leaving a widow and two children. The remaining works in his studio were sold by Christie & Manson in March, the same year.

Note: John William Wright and John Masey Wright (1777–1866) have been frequently confused with each other (according to the Folger Shakespeare Library), as they both worked for Charles Heath and their birth and death dates overlap.
