= Raymond; a Fragment =

1799 Gothic short story

"Raymond; a Fragment" is a short Gothic story published in 1799. Signed under the pseudonym Juvenis, it was reprinted, plagiarized, and served as the inspiration for other Gothic tales; it was likely inspired by a 1796 Gothic story. It is part of the genre of fragmentary writing, which uses supernatural motifs without explanation.

== Plot ==
Raymond is sitting at his house following the abduction of his wife, Miranda, shortly after their marriage ceremony. He hears a woman screaming, and he grabs a sword and searches for her. He enters a ruined castle, and after looking through a succession of hallways and chambers (in one, he finds a skeleton wearing armor), he happens upon a man carrying a bloody knife across from a dead woman. After killing the man, he discovers the woman is Miranda.

== Publication history ==
"Raymond; a Fragment" appeared in the February 1799 issue of Lady's Magazine as the work of the pseudonymous Juvenis. Since they share substantial textual and plot overlap, it was likely inspired by the earlier "Sir Edmund, a Gothic Fragment" that appeared in the June 1796 issue of European Magazine by "Fredericsberg Germanicus". Attributed to Juvenis, the story appeared in the March 1799 issue of Hibernian Magazine, an 1810 issue of The Weekly Visitor (with Miranda's name changed to Louisa), an 1821 fiction anthology, and an 1824 issue of the Western Sun & General Advertiser of Indiana; it was plagiarized with an altered title ("Albert and Albina: A Fragment") and distorted authorship around December 1799 as part of a bluebook; (Note: Although Pitcher 1976 says "it is impossible to demonstrate" whether the Albert or Raymond versions "is a plagiarism", Pitcher 1996 states the Raymond version was the original.) pieces of the text were plagiarized in an 1826 story entitled "St. Aubin and Angelina"; and an inspired short story, "Arthur Kavanagh", was printed in an issue of The Irish Shield from 1830 or 1831.

There are two modern reprints of the story: The Candle and the Tower by Robert D. Spector (1974) and The Oxford Book of Gothic Tales by Chris Baldick (1992).

The text is part of the Gothic fragment genre, which included stories like "Sir Bertrand, a Fragment" (by Anna Aikin, 1773), "Montmorenci, a Fragment" (by Nathan Drake, 1798), "Sir Edwin, A Fragment" (1800), and "Malvina" (1809). Like other stories in the genre, "Raymond; a Fragment" uses supernatural elements without explanation.

== Notes and references ==
=== Works cited ===
- Aguirre, Manuel (2021). "Formulaic language". In Bloom, Clive (ed.). The Palgrave handbook of Gothic origins. Palgrave Macmillan. ISBN 9783030845629.
- Frank, Frederick S. (2002). "Gothic chapbooks, bluebooks, and short stories in the magazines (1790–1820)". In Thomson, Douglass H.; Voller, Jack G.; Frank, Frederick S. (eds.). Gothic writers: A critical and bibliographical guide. Greenwood Press. ISBN 0313305005.
- Mayo, Robert D. (1942). "The Gothic short story in the magazines". The Modern Language Review. 37: 448–454. ProQuest 1293759747.
- Pitcher, Edward W. (1976). "Changes in short fiction in Britain 1785–1810: Philosophic tales, Gothic tales, and fragments and visions". Studies in Short Fiction. 13 (3). ProQuest 1297933396.
- Pitcher, Edward W. (1996). "Eighteenth-century Gothic fragments and the paradigm of violation and repair". Studies in Short Fiction. 33 (1): 35–42. ProQuest 1297937994.
