= Marguerite Agnes Power =

British novelist, writer for periodicals and editor

Marguerite Agnes Power (1815–1867) was a British novelist, writer for periodicals, and editor throughout the majority of her life.

== Biography ==
Power was born in 1815 to Agnes and Colonel Robert Power. She is thought to have spent her childhood in Ireland, where her father managed the estates in County Tyrone after he returned from a career in the British army.

She was a respectable, hardworking writer who was frequently poor. She is often forgotten despite her many contributions. However, her legacy remains within her many works, including her contributions to The Keepsake, Book of Beauty and also to the Illustrated London News and other periodicals. She is known for her memoir of her aunt Lady Blessington, as well as her book Arabian Days and Nights (1863), an account of a winter's residence in Egypt.

Power died in July 1867 after a long illness.

== Works ==
Books as writer:

- Evelyn Forester: A Woman's Story (1856)
- The Foresters, 2 vols
- Letters of a Betrothed (1858)
- Nelly Carew, 2 vols (1859)
- Sweethearts and Wives, 3 vols (1861)

As editor

- The Keepsake, annual volumes for 1851 to 1857

Power also contributed to Irish Metropolitan Magazine, Forget-me-not, and Once a Week.
