= Eliza Sharpe =

English painter

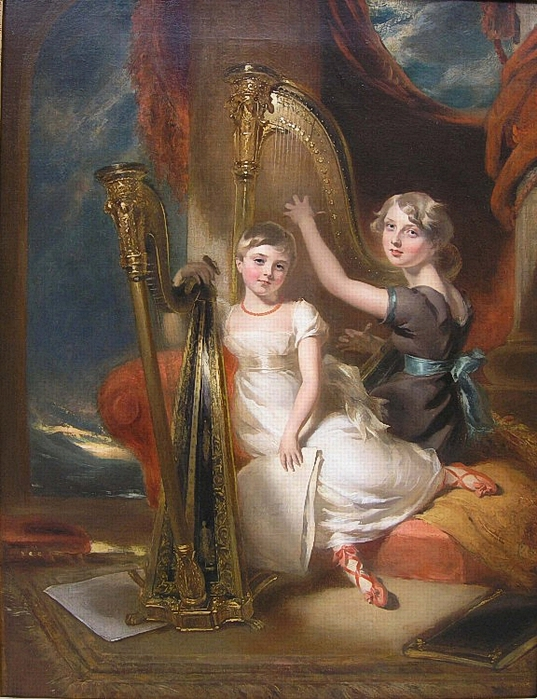
- Portrait of Louisa and Eliza Sharpe by George Henry Harlow
- Born: August 1796; Birmingham, England
- Died: 1874; London, England

Eliza Sharpe (1796–1874) was a British miniature painter who was one of four gifted sisters.

== Life ==
Sharpe was born in Birmingham to Sussanna and an engraver named William Sharpe and she was baptised on 21 August 1796 at St Phillip's church. The parents allowed Eliza, Louisa, Mary Ann and Charlotte to travel to the continent to inspect galleries in France and Germany.

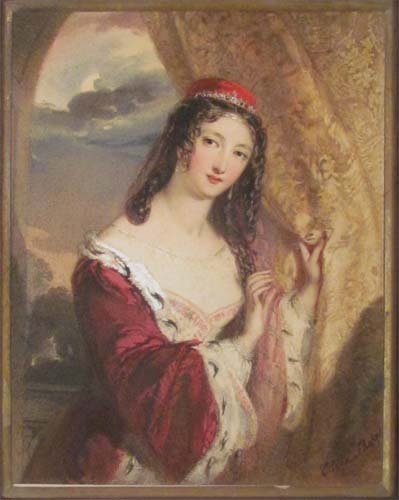
Eliza Sharpe - "Victorian Woman" - watercolour

William taught each of the daughters to engrave. William and Sussanna moved the Sharpe family to London in 1817. Whilst she was a child, she was painted with her sister Louisa by George Henry Harlow. She had nearly fifty miniature portrait paintings accepted at the Royal Academy starting in 1817.

Eliza's sister, Louise, married in 1834 and moved to Dresden. Eliza visited her there when she was in Germany. Anna Brownell Jameson wrote of Louise and Eliza Sharpe that no man could paint like they did. This was not because the Sharpe sisters work was so clever, but because it was so essentially feminine.

Like her sister, Eliza became a member of the old Watercolour society where she exhibited over 80 paintings and rose to be their secretary. The most expensive pictures were biblical scenes but her other custom work sold well, though at more modest prices. These prices and her success at having her work engraved for annuals allowed her to amass "a modest little fortune".

Eliza died unmarried at the house of her nephew in 1874 in London.
