= Mary Ann and Charlotte Sharpe =

19th-century British artists

Mary Ann Sharpe
- Born: 1802? Birmingham
- Died: 1867

Charlotte Sharpe (c. 1793–1849) and Mary Ann Sharpe (1802? – 1867) were British artists.

== Life ==
Charlotte Sharpe was baptised at St Phillip's church in Birmingham on the 2 July 1793. Her parents were Sussanna (born Fairhead?) and the engraver William Sharpe. She had three younger sisters, Eliza Sharpe (1798-1874), Louisa Sharpe and Mary Anne Sharpe (1802-1867) who all became artists.

Her sister Mary Anne Sharpe was also born in Birmingham and she was baptised on 31 December 1802 at St Martin's, Birmingham. The parents allowed all of their daughters to travel to the continent to inspect galleries in France and Germany and each of the daughters was taught to engrave.

William and Sussanna moved the Sharpe family to London in 1816. Mary Ann Sharpe lived with her sister Eliza and she exhibited in Manchester and Liverpool. Charlotte and Mary Ann each exhibited nineteen paintings exhibited at the Royal Academy. Charlotte married Captain Best Morris and they had a daughter Charlotte B.Morris who was also an artist.

Charlotte died in 1849 and Mary Ann died (likely of cancer) in 1867. Mary Ann was known as "a gentle, refined, retiring lady...beloved by all who knew her, talented and industrious."
