= William Henry Mote =

British stipple and line engraver

William Henry Mote (1803–1871) was a British stipple and line engraver, primarily known for his portraits. He produced etchings for reference books, as well as original etchings. Mote became a member of the Royal Academy in his twenties and his portraits hang in the National Portrait Gallery, London.

== Life ==
Mote was first mentioned in publications as working under the supervision of Charles Heath when he was sixteen or seventeen years old. He became a member of the Royal Academy when he was roughly 28-years-old. He also was one of many engravers to sign a petition addressed to the King and the Royal Academy in 1837 to protest the limitation of engravers to distinction as "associates". His sons are listed as engravers in contemporary census records and the London Directories. It is unknown exactly how much Mote's sons worked under their father's name.

He was commissioned by King George IV to produce an engraving for the Greenwich Hospital, which was presented a year after King George's death. Mote often etched portraits of royalty. Mote also worked with female artists, and a high percentage of his etchings found their way into publications produced by women.

The National Portrait Gallery (London) contains 65 portrait engravings from Mote. Mote's portrait of Sir Rowland Hill, which is now in the National Portrait Gallery, was published in 1820, when Mote would have been 17-years-old. Additionally, there are 15 engravings in the Farnsworth Shakespeare Collection (Rhode Island College) and 21 etchings in the National Maritime Museum produced by Mote.

He maintained a working relationship with the Heaths throughout his career and his engravings were often printed in their publications. New technology introduced in 1820 allowed more books to be produced. Publication of annuals with etchings of beautiful women was a fad that lasted from 1823 to 1857, and Mote was a prolific engraver of this content. In the 1830s the etchings became popular as watercolor projects, and many people turned etchings into wall art.

Although mainly a portrait engraver, Mote also produced religious and art etchings. At least 101 portrait etchings by William Mote now reside in various museums.

== Etching in the nineteenth century ==
The heyday of steel engraved book illustration was between 1825 and 1845, and a rapid expansion of this field took place in London around 1820. This coincided with Mote's first known etching. He was an innovator with steel plate engravings not only because of his talent for etching but because he was in the right place (London) at the right time (1820) and worked for the right man (Charles Heath).

Etchers expressed fears of being replaced by photography in the 1865 minutes of the Royal Academy. By 1880 steel engravings were in serious decline and steel etching was being replaced with newer technology. Despite this decline, steel etchings were used as late as the 1920s in some mass-produced books. Steel etching is currently used for currency.

== WT Mote as possible misspelling of WH Mote ==
Some etchings attributed to Mote are labeled WT Mote. This is likely a mistake and these etchings were probably done by WH Mote. These etchings were published in Lodge's Illustrious Portraits. There was an advertisement in Bent's Literary Advertiser advertising these plates for sale by auction, and they were purchased for £4,200 by W. Smith at the 22 November auction. (Adjusted for inflation: £370,000 in 2010, however, on eBay, twelve etchings failed to sell for $20 in 2009.). These mistakes may have come from a typesetting error under the plate. The book itself had set borders and the border of the etching may have been done by someone other than Mote. This could also mean that the etching itself may have been a team effort. There is no evidence that there was an etcher using the name Mote, and there was only one "Mote" mentioned in the auction sale of the original plates. "WT" were the initials of another engraver working on the same project, William Thomas Fry. The engraving for John Stuart, 3rd Earl of Bute has the same engraving appearing in two books. He appears in Lodges Illustrious Portraits with the brand WT Mote, but appeared a year earlier with the WH Mote brand. One of "his" final engravings is branded "WH Mote co.", where "co." is assumed to be company, which would have included Mote's sons.

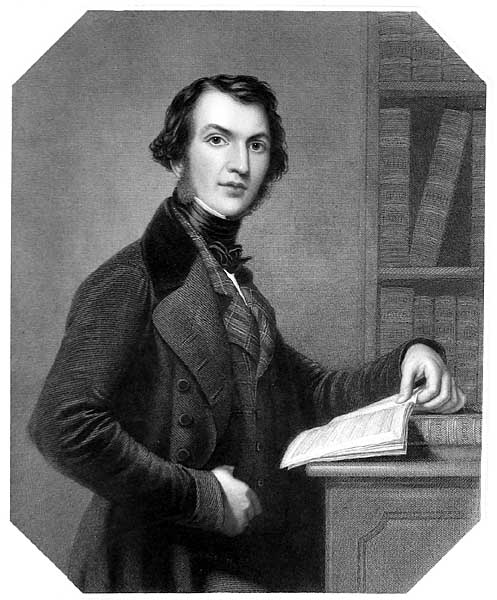
Etching of Sir Gladstone

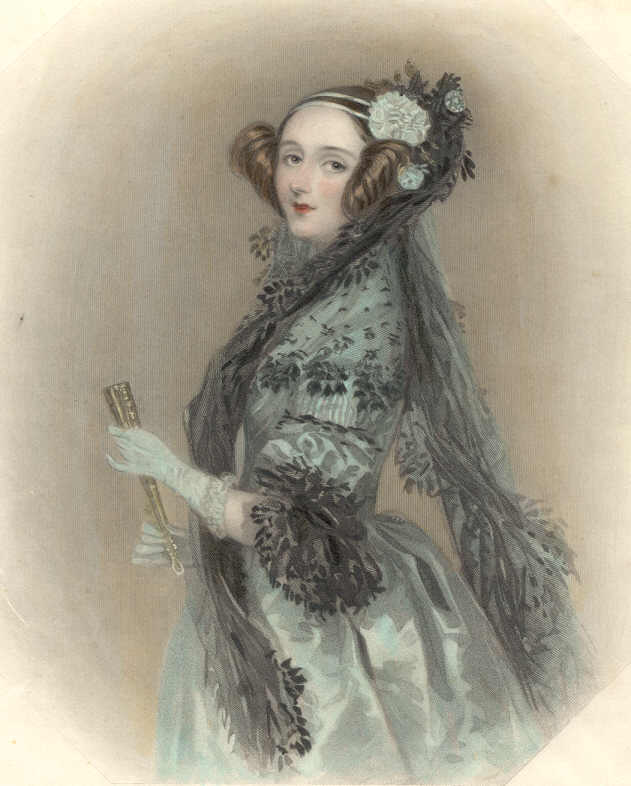
Colorized Etching of Ada Lovelace

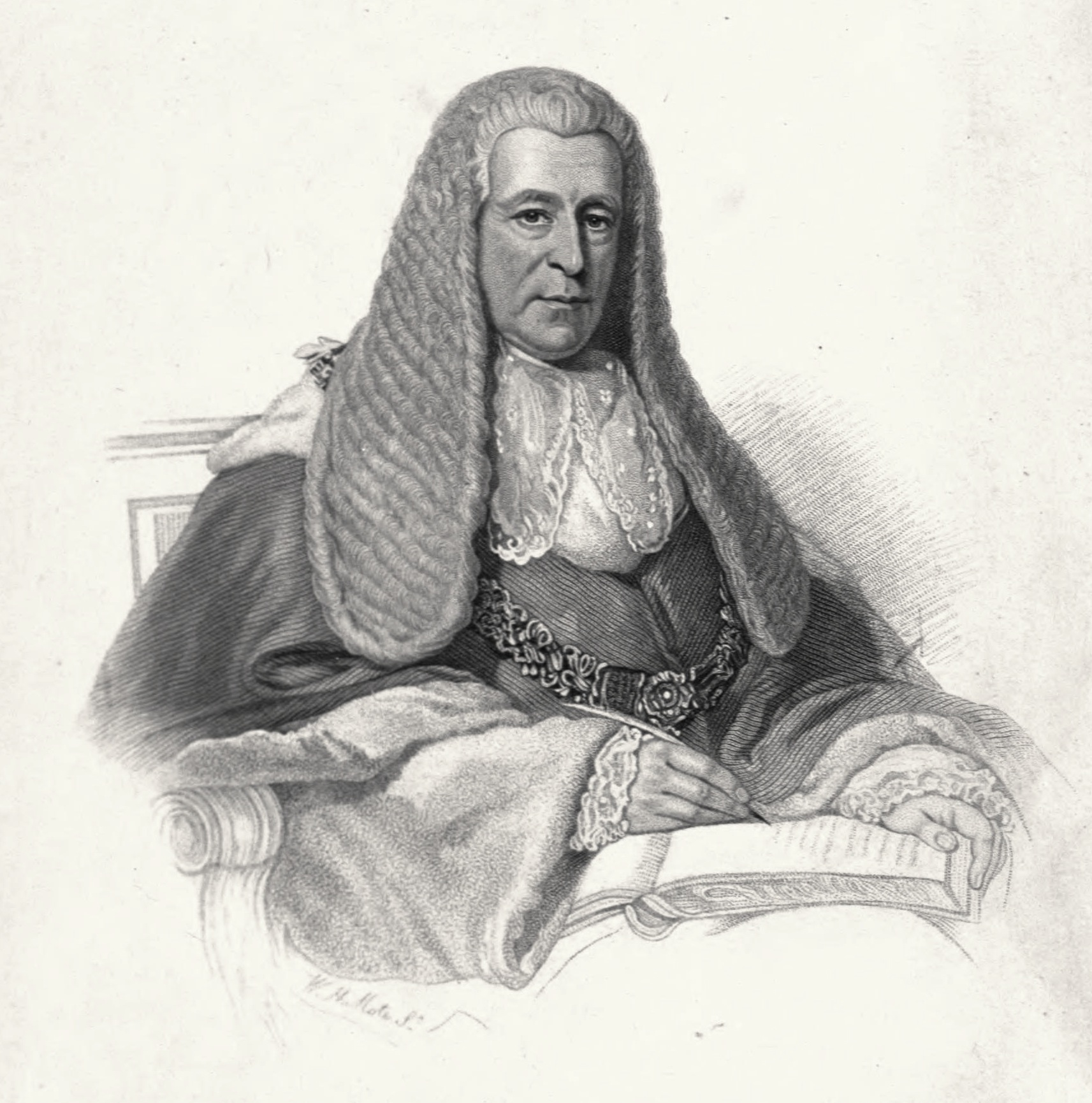
Etching of Thomas Lefroy

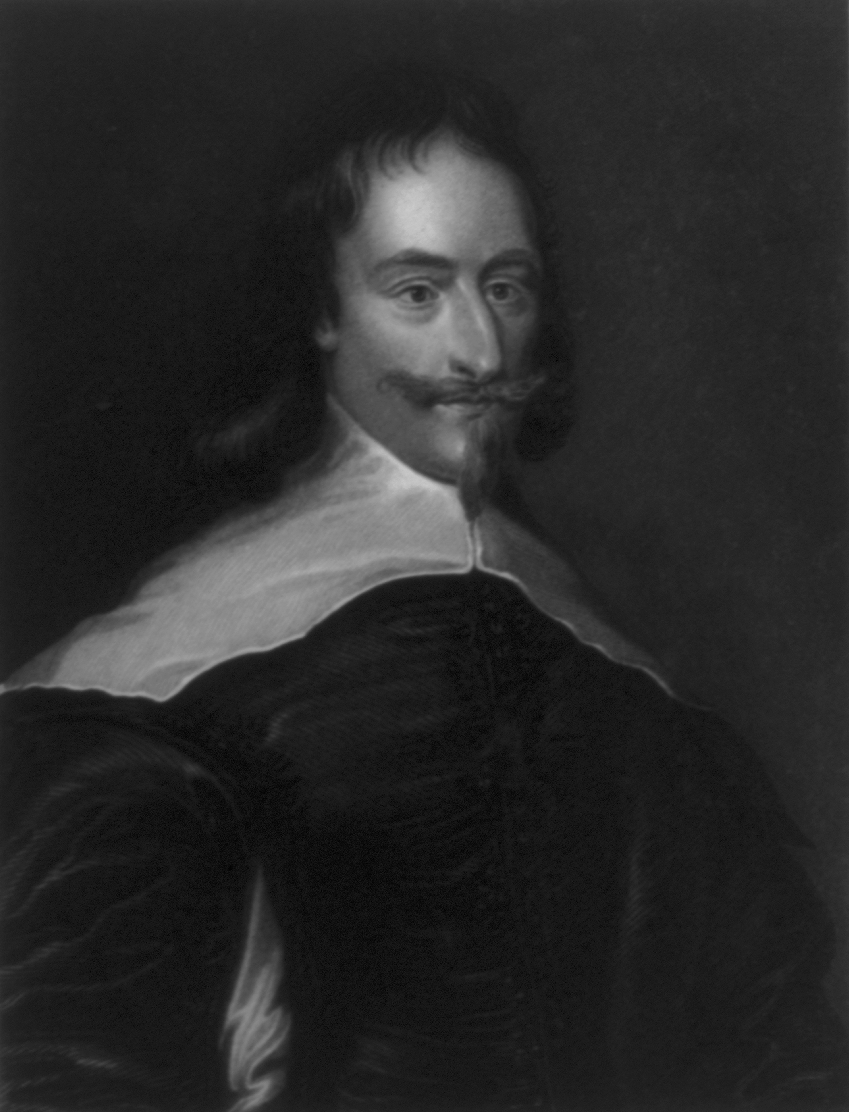
Etching of Archibald Campbell

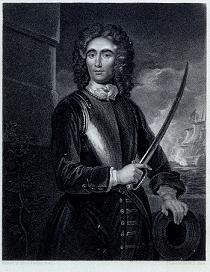
Etching of John Benbow for King George to be given to hospital, after which, Mote was admitted to the Royal Academy.

== Family ==
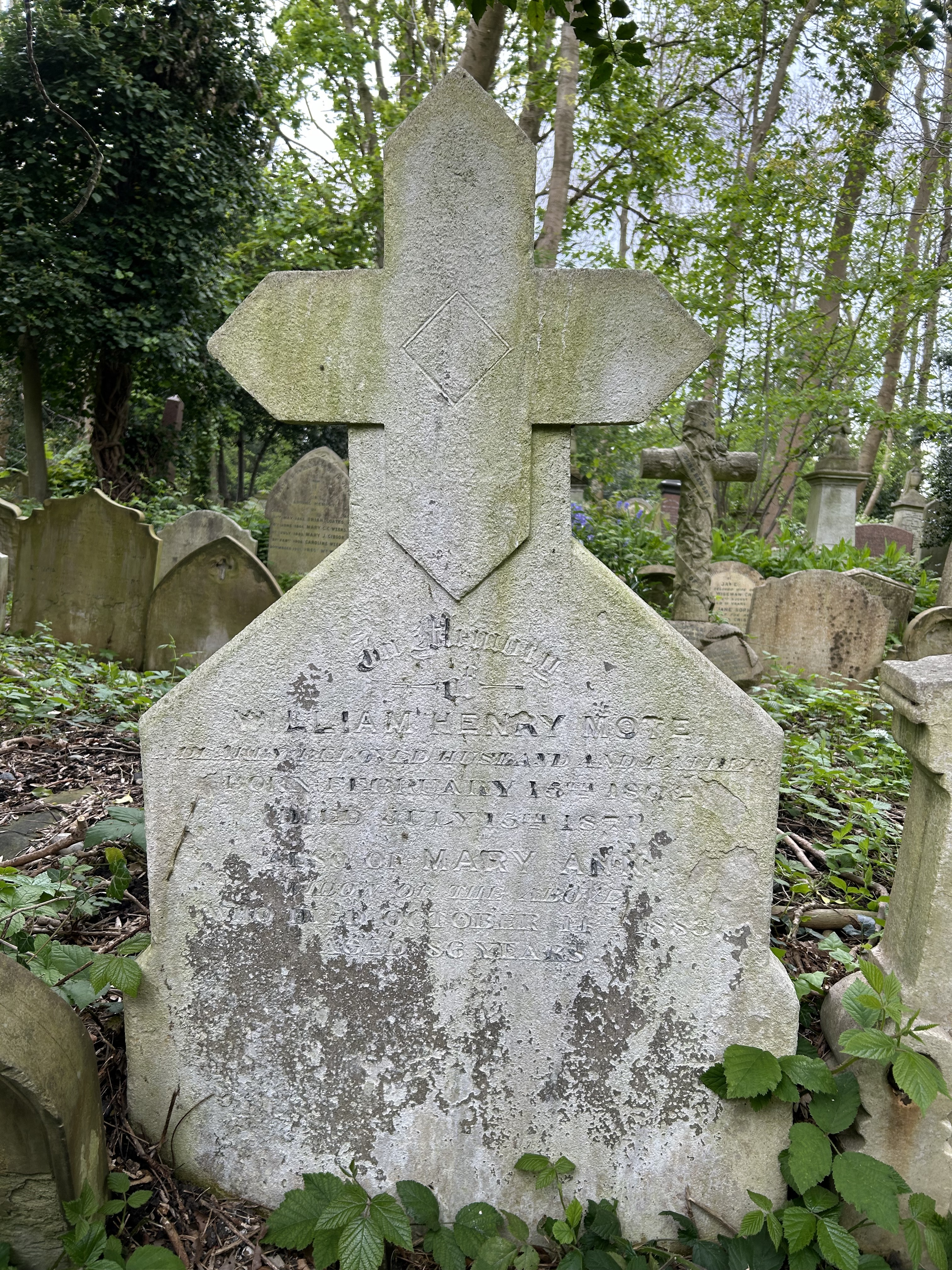
Grave of William Henry Mote in Highgate Cemetery

William Henry Mote was born to Christopher and Hannah Mote in 1803, who had a second son, Edward. This choice of names was in keeping with a family tradition, as followed by Christopher's brothers and uncles.

William Henry Mote was baptized at St. John Horsley Down, Southwark, England. He married Mary Ann Bather (born 1799) and their marriage was announced in St George Hanover Square Parish Records. William Henry Mote died in 1871 in St. Johns, Middlesex, England. He was buried on 19 July 1871 in a family grave on the western side of Highgate Cemetery, London.

=== Children ===
1. Daughter: Mary Ann Mote: born 22 November 1830. (Baptism, marriage to Reynolds, death after 1911 in a house her owned by her brother Edward, passed down from their father. ).
2. Son: William Henry Mote, Jr: Born 30 Aug 1832. Listed as engraver on census records, and lived for years in his fathers house.
3. Son: Edward Mote Born 19 June 1834 at St. Pancras, London, Middlesex, England. Baptized on 9 July 1834.

After his death, his son Edward Mote marketed himself as a portrait engraver, worked out of his father's house, and was listed in the 1884 and 1895 London Directories. Although Edward marketed himself as a portrait engraver for twenty five years after his father's death, there are no known surviving engravings attributed to Edward Mote.

== Sons engraving under their father's name ==
William Henry Mote produced volumes of etchings long before his sons would have been old enough to help. Census records and London business directories indicate that his sons listed steel etching as their profession, and they appear never to have left the family home. After WH's death, Edward listed his home address as the business address in the 1884 and 1895 London Directories. The sheer volume of etchings make it difficult to believe that Mote worked alone. There is at least one etching branded "WH Mote co." and the "company" included his sons. The lack of known etchings from Mote's sons after their father's death may be due to the decline in the etching business following the introduction of cheaper illustration technology.

== King George III and King George IV ==
King George III and King George IV were both patrons of the arts. King George IV commented that art needs to be signed so that the people can tell good art from bad. It is unknown if this was tongue in cheek or if King George was sincere in this comment, but the result was that engravings were then marked by the engraver. Especially engravings from artists who wished to be inducted into the Royal Academy, or engravers already belonging to the Academy. Mote became a member of the Royal Academy in 1831, shortly after King George IV's death. Most of Mote's etchings are signed at the bottom right corner. If there is a different original artist for the engraved image, then Mote often put the original artists name on the left bottom side of the etching.

Many of Mote's engravings were historical figures because these etchings were started by the royal family to share this art with the public through various publication. Royal woman (including Lady Blessington) often got involved in these projects. The "beauty franchice books", which created a perpetual glorification of beauty fell out of popularity by 1848 when Charles Heath died. Charles Heath died in debt to Lady Blessington for £700.

== Charles Heath and Mote ==
The Heath family was a publishing-engraving dynasty started by Charles Heath's father. Mote's engravings first appeared in the Heath family's publications. Charles Heath suffered some financial setbacks but his books are still being sold today. At one point Charles Heath took a former employer to court about his engravings, arguing that it was permissible for the engraver to keep between six and twelve impressions for himself. The English court agreed, and decided that the engravers were entitled to retain eight impressions of their work but could not sell these engravings until after their death, when they become part of the engraver's estate (The Gentleman's Magazine, volume 97).

The Heaths hired Mote and appear to have launched his career. A professional relationship existed between Mote and Charles Heath for years, and Mote's engravings often appear in Heath publications including The Heaths Book of Beauty and its American counterpart The American Book of Beauty). The American Book of Beauty is known for mixing up etchings between books, with etching of one woman from the same book printed in different places. Later editions remove the descriptions under the etchings, and include two more women etched by Mote than the original edition. One of the etchings is known to be of a different woman then the story. Some editions have appeared to "white" out the Mote brand on the right corner, and the original artist's name, and subtitles to the etchings. Some believe this is an issue with cleaning the plates, but this does not account for the scrambled order of the book plates.

== Mote's etchings of marble statues and protests ==
Mote did some engravings for The Art Journal of famous marble statues. Most of the statues are unclothed. In protest of the "nudity" of the statues in The Art Journal, some people bought the publication in order to rip out the nude etchings and send them back to the publisher. The protest was a success in terms of sales, as all available copies were sold. There are no known Mote etchings of nude adults (two child cherubs are nude), other than the fuzzy representation of the nude statues.
