= The Lady's Magazine =

British women's monthly periodical, 1770–1847

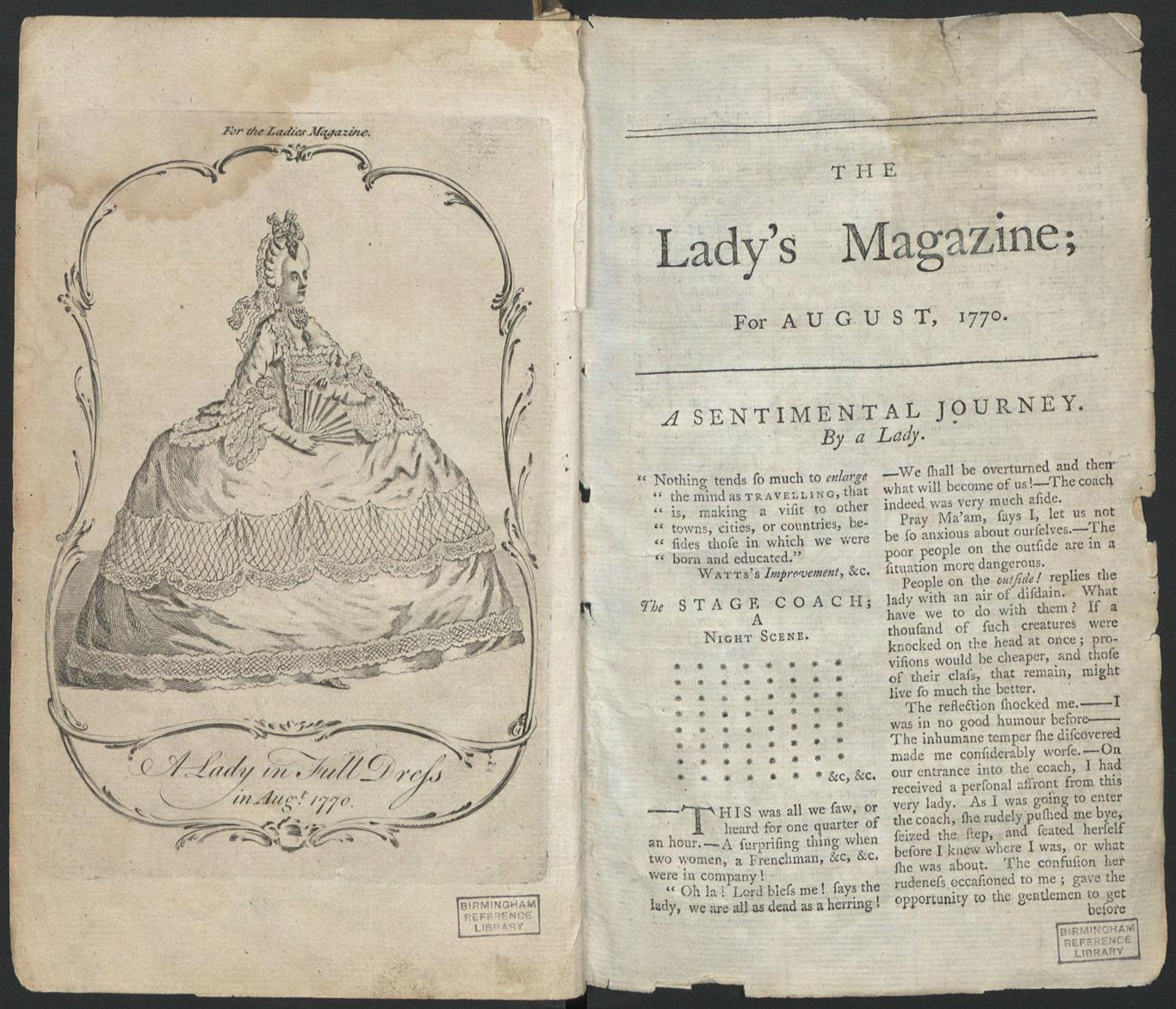
The Lady's Magazine – August 1770

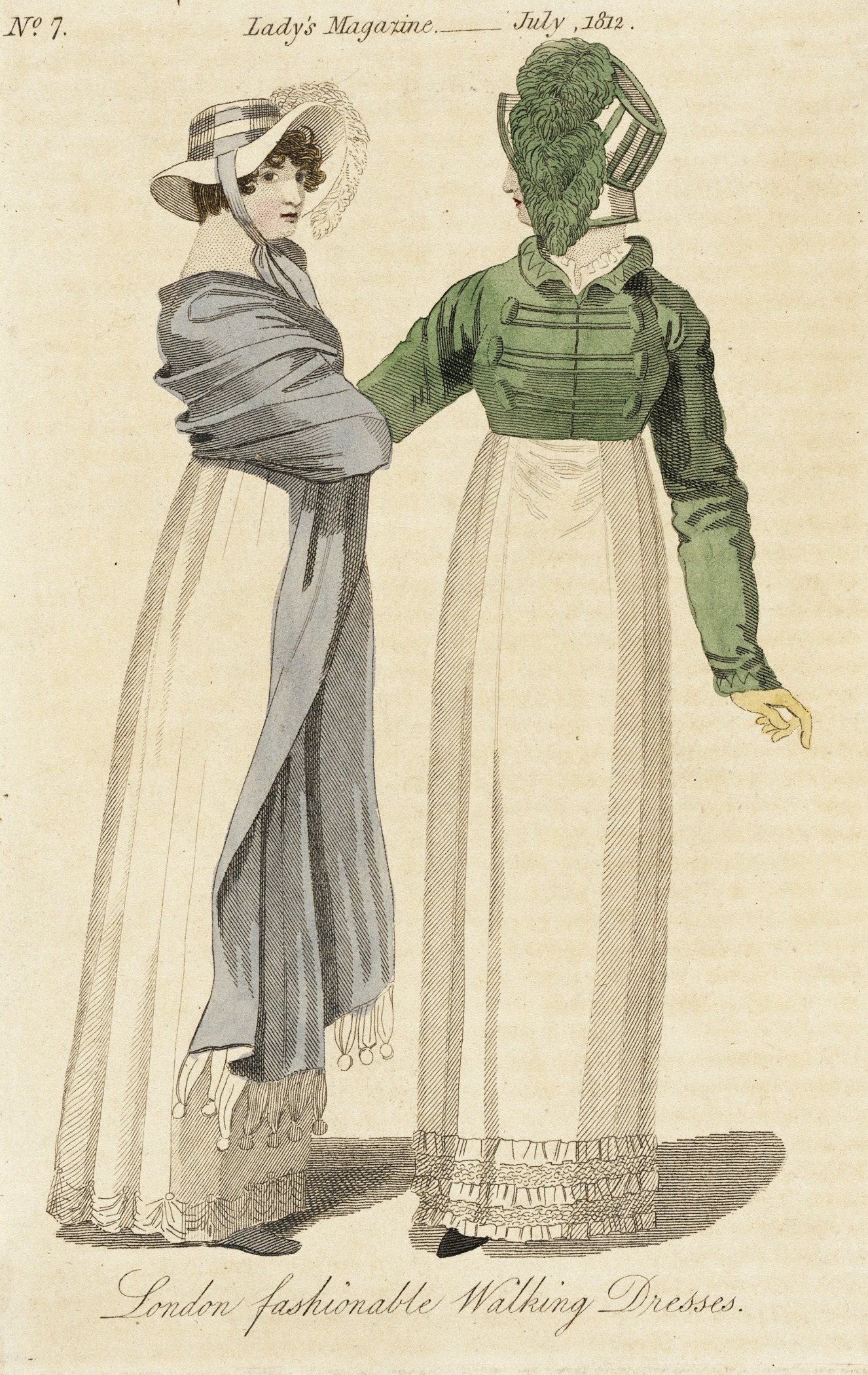
London Regency-fashionable Walking Dresseses, often referred to as Promenade Dresses, July 1812, including a spencer

The Lady's Magazine; or Entertaining Companion for the Fair Sex, Appropriated Solely to Their Use and Amusement, was an early British women's magazine published monthly from 1770 until 1847. Priced at sixpence per copy, it began publication in August 1770 by the London bookseller John Coote and the publisher John Wheble, later, George Robinson (bookseller). It featured articles on fiction, poetry, fashion, music, and social gossip and was, according to the Victoria and Albert Museum, "the first woman's magazine to enjoy lasting success."

The magazine claimed a readership of 16,000, a figure that has been considered high when contemporary literacy levels and underdeveloped printing technologies are taken into account. George Robinson's The Lady's Magazine; or Entertaining Companion for the Fair Sex, Appropriated Solely to Their Use and Amusement dominated the market for most of its run, and led to imitations like the Lady's Monthly Museum and Alexander Hogg's New Lady's Magazine, or, Polite, useful, Entertaining, and fashionable Companion for the Fair Sex.

One of these rivals was published just a few doors down from the shop of the Lady’s Magazine publisher, George Robinson, who worked out of 25 Paternoster Row. Alexander Hogg, who in the 1780s worked out of no. 16, launched the disingenuosly named New Lady’s Magazine in February 1782 much to the anger of Robinson who waged a war of words with the scurrilous Hogg in the newspapers, at publisher gatherings and on the pavement of the Row itself. Robinson had good reason to be angry given that the New Lady’s Magazine (1782-96?) filled many (though not all) of its pages with content originally written and published in the Lady’s Magazine.

== History ==
Prior to the emergence of magazines in the early eighteenth century, information and news in Great Britain were primarily distributed through pamphlets, newspapers, and broadsides. The concept of a magazine slowly developed in reaction to new laws which sought to control political propaganda; in 1712 the government passed a Stamp Tax on each single- or half-sheet publication, nearly doubling the price of newspapers and some periodicals. Publishers seeking to avoid or pay a lower tax did so by expanding their single-sheet writings into lengthier publications, classifying them as pamphlets or journals. Many also switched their publication schedules by producing works weekly or monthly, rather than daily or semi-weekly.

In addition to the desire to avoid government regulations and taxes, magazines were established as a new medium in which to convey information to a larger group of readers, which could be reached through Britain's growing transportation network. The Gentleman's Magazine, a publication established in 1731, avoided this tax by producing a monthly publication that claimed to feature the reprinting of news (rather than the transmission of news, which the tax targeted). The Lady's Magazine was not the first women's magazine. It was conceived by the London bookseller John Coote and the publisher John Wheble, and first appeared in print in August 1770. John Huddlestone Wynne, an early editor of the magazine, also edited several other contemporary publications. In early 1771, John Coote sold his interest in the magazine to its new publisher George Robinson.

The Lady's Magazine dominated the market from its founding to 1830. It claimed a readership of 16,000, a sum the 18th-century scholar Ros Ballaster considered a success when analysing the country's contemporary literacy levels and underdeveloped printing technologies. Its success led to imitations like the Lady's Monthly Museum and the New Lady's Magazine.

The magazine was cheaply priced at sixpence per copy, and continued to be published until 1847. Up to 1830, it was titled Lady's Magazine; or Entertaining Companion for the Fair Sex, Appropriated Solely to Their Use and Amusement. After 1830, the publication was renamed to Lady's Magazine or Mirror of the Belles Lettres, Fine Arts, Music, Drama, Fashions, etc., and in 1832 it merged with the Lady's Monthly Museum to become known as the Lady's Magazine and Museum of the Belles Lettres, Fine Arts, Music, Drama, Fashions, etc. It ceased publication in 1847. (See La Belle Assemblée.)

== Content ==
Most who wrote for the publication were professional or semi-professional writers, and it could claim the author and dramatist Mary Russell Mitford among its contributors. The Lady's Magazine featured many of the same stories that appeared in contemporary men's magazines like The Gentleman's Magazine, such as articles on poetry and the London stage; society news was another common topic. Unlike many men's publications, however, the Lady's Magazine largely stayed out of the political sphere and did not report on political events; for instance, in the lead-up to the French Revolutionary Wars, Lady's Magazine readers are reassured that France is no match for British naval power, while readers of The Gentleman's Magazine are warned that Europe is "at the present moment [in a state of] alarm and danger". Mary Poovey, a professor of English, posits that The Lady's Magazine's projection of national strength was intended to avoid alarming its female readers and thus causing anxiety in the domestic sphere; conversely, men's magazines sought to arouse anger over an emerging enemy and thus encourage male readers to be ready to undertake an active military role.

While not classified as a fashion magazine, it did feature the subject in detail. It was lavishly illustrated and including needlework patterns for embroidery women's, men's and children's clothing and household objects. In addition to fashion and dress, other featured subjects included fiction, music, and biographies. The scholar Margaret Beetham argues that by featuring these topics, Lady's Magazine "came to define 'the woman's magazine' for the next century". The Lady's Magazine, with its diverse range of subjects, helped normalise such magazines among upper-class readers. In the magazine's first issue, it promised that in its content, "the housewife as well as the peeress shall meet with something suitable to their different walks of life". The magazine is also notable as being the first to print extracts of upcoming books.

The Lady's Magazine sought to take a moral stance and display decorum in its writings. It printed a popular column on medical advice; frequently written by a male doctor, the column gave readers information on topics such as breast-feeding and menstrual pains. This Dr Cook also occasionally included mentions of sexuality, often with a sense of tawdry humour; one June 1775 article, for instance, spoke of fertility and hair colour, concluding that redheads have "the finest skins... and generally become the best breeders of the nation". Ballister considers the mention of these subjects to be "progressive" for the era, and speculates that the magazine was able to print them due to the doctor's "elderly eccentricity", gender, and professional status.

== See also ==
- List of 18th-century British periodicals
- List of 18th-century British periodicals for women
- List of women's magazines
- Gallery of Fashion
- "Raymond; a Fragment" – a short story originating in The Lady's Magazine
