= Gothic fragment =

Type of Gothic short story

The Gothic fragment is a type of Gothic fiction characterized by short, atmospheric stories with abrupt beginnings and ends. Widely popular in the late 18th century, gothic fragments are narratives driven by supernatural motifs without explanation. Many were inspired by the works of Nathan Drake, Anna Aikin, and John Aikin.

== Definition and analysis ==
The Gothic fragment is a type of short Gothic fiction popular in the late 18th century, perhaps approaching the popularity of the Gothic novels of the time. Unlike the Gothic tale, fragments focus mostly on atmosphere instead of plot, and they are written mostly to astonish the reader rather than provide a moral conclusion. While some fragments attempt to explain supernatural elements of their stories, most do not, and fragments typically start abruptly and end without resolution. In this way, Gothic fragments are largely dissimilar from Gothic novels. Although their beginnings and endings are abrupt, they are not incomplete narratives.

Many fragments were published in literary magazines like the Lady's Magazine and the Lady's Monthly Museum. Several are inspired by "Sir Bertrand: A Fragment" (in Miscellaneous Pieces in Prose, 1773) and "Montmorenci, a Fragment" (by Nathan Drake, 1790). While distinctions between Gothic tales and fragments are not entirely well-defined – some stories, like "Fitzalan" (1797), tend to belong in both categories – most fragments are distinctively fragmentary.

== Examples ==
- "Sir Bertrand: A Fragment" – the first Gothic fragment, written by Anna and/or John Aikin (1773) (Note: While Kędra-Kardela 2012, p. 342, attributes the story to Anna Aikin, Pitcher 1996, p. 36, calls this attribution a "tradition" not fully supported by the historical evidence; he attributes it to the Aikins collectively.)
- "A Fragment. In the Manner of the Old Romances" – story inspired by "Sir Bertrand: A Fragment" by Mary Hays (1789)
- "Story of Sir Gawen" – story by Nathan Drake (1790) (Note: Listed as a Gothic tale in Pitcher 1976. Mayo 1950, p. 777, states the story was sustaintly altered between its original 1790 publication and its 1798 appearance in Drake's Literary Hours as "Henry Fitzhowen, a Gothic Tale".)
- "The Two Knights. A Fragment" – story inspired by "Sir Bertrand: A Fragment" by W. G. (1795)
- "Lothaire: A Legend" – story by Harriet Lee
- "Sir Edmund, a Gothic Fragment" – story by "Fredericsberg Germanicus" (1796)
- "Montmorenci, a Fragment" – story by Nathan Drake (1798) (Note: Rendered as "Montmorency, a Fragment" in Pitcher 1976 and Mayo 1950.)
- "Raymond; a Fragment" – story inspired by "Sir Edmund, a Gothic Fragment" by the pseudonymous "Juvenis" (1799) (Note: Also given as "Albert and Albina" in a contemporaneous reprinting.)

== Notes and references ==
=== Works cited ===
- Grove, Allen W. (1997). "To make a long story short: Gothic fragments and the gender politics of incompleteness". Studies in Short Fiction. 34 (1): 1–9. EBSCOhost 817032.
- Kędra-Kardela, Anna (2012). "Between a fragment and a whole. A cognitive analysis of the Gothic fragment as a literary genre. A case study of Anna Letitia Aikin's 'Sir Bertrand: A Fragment'". In Fabiszak, Jacek; Urbaniak-Rybicka, Ewa; Wolski, Bartosz (eds.). Crossroads in literature and culture. Springer. ISBN 9783642219948.
- Mayo, Robert D. (1942). "The Gothic short story in the magazines". The Modern Language Review. 37 (4): 448–454. JSTOR 3716489.
- Mayo, Robert D. (1950). "Gothic romance in the magazines". PMLA. 65 (5): 762–789. JSTOR 459573.
- Pitcher, Edward W. (1976). "Changes in short fiction in Britain 1785–1810: Philosophic tales, Gothic tales, and fragments and visions". Studies in Short Fiction. 13 (3). ProQuest 1297933396.
- Pitcher, Edward W. (1996). "Eighteenth-century Gothic fragments and the paradigm of violation and repair". Studies in Short Fiction. 33 (1): 35–42. ProQuest 1297937994.
