= Charles Heath =

British engraver, currency and stamp printer, book publisher and illustrator

Charles Theodosius Heath (1 March 1785 – 18 November 1848) was a British engraver, currency and stamp printer, book publisher and illustrator.

== Life and career ==
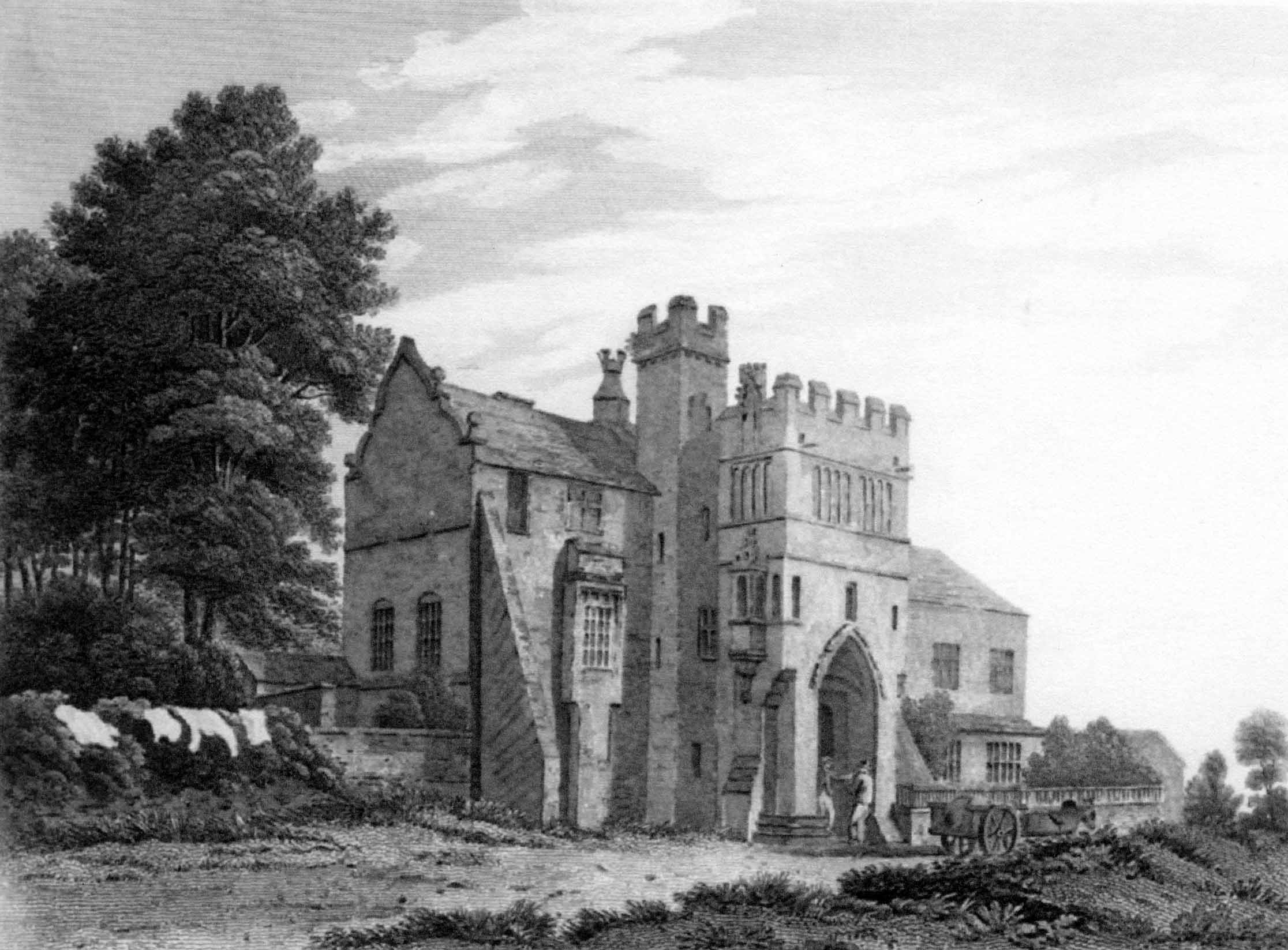
Saighton Grange (1817, engraving after George Pickering)

He was the illegitimate son of James Heath, a successful engraver who enjoyed the patronage of King George III and successive monarchs. Early in life he became a fellow of the Society of British Artists, and contributed for some years to their exhibitions.

=== The American connection ===
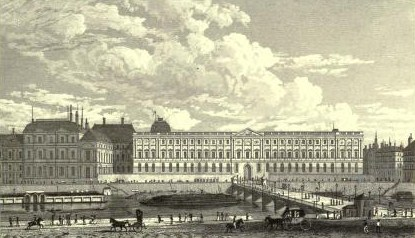
View of the Louvre (1831, engraved after Augustus Charles Pugin)

Jacob Perkins the American inventor developed siderography, a steel engraving technique, and in 1809 met Joseph Chessborough Dyer, an American who moved to England and acted as Perkins's agent. Perkins went to England in 1819, with his eldest son Ebenezer and associates, to bid for a Bank of England contract to print banknotes. He gained the contract. Heath had encouraged Perkins to come to England.

From 1819 Charles Heath and then (1820) his half-brother George Heath (1779–1852) were in partnership with Perkins, working with the new technique of siderography. Charles Heath replaced Asa Spencer, a partner of Perkins who returned to the United States, while George Heath was a financial backer. Perkins and his other American partner Gideon Fairman were in the United Kingdom for a period. With finance from Dyer for a printing press, the company traded as Perkins, Fairman, and Heath. Initially Perkins and Heath used nitric acid for the steel engraving, and shallow lines were an issue during the 1820s. They then jointly purchased rights to the etching fluid developed by Wilson Lowry.

Joshua Butters Bacon (1790–1863), son-in-law of Perkins who settled in England, bought out the Heath interest in the company, by mid-1829. It then assumed the name Perkins, Bacon or Perkins Bacon by which it is usually known.

=== Rights of engravers ===
Charles Heath believed that custom entitled engravers to make and keep a limited number of impressions of their work. When he was sued by the publisher, John Murray, in 1826, as a result of having made and kept such impressions, he relied on that supposed custom, but, in 1830, a jury denied its existence. Then, in 1831, the judges of the Court of King's Bench held that his conduct had been unlawful at common law, though not a breach of the Prints Copyright Act 1777.

=== Annuals ===
An entrepreneur who sought out other new markets, Heath was a driving force behind, and contributor to, the new genre of the literary annual. He established his own annual, The Keepsake, first published at the end of 1827, and approached William Harrison Ainsworth to become its editor. His first choice had been Sir Walter Scott, then having money troubles. Scott had declined, but sent Heath some stories first intended for Chronicles of the Canongate.

=== Later life ===
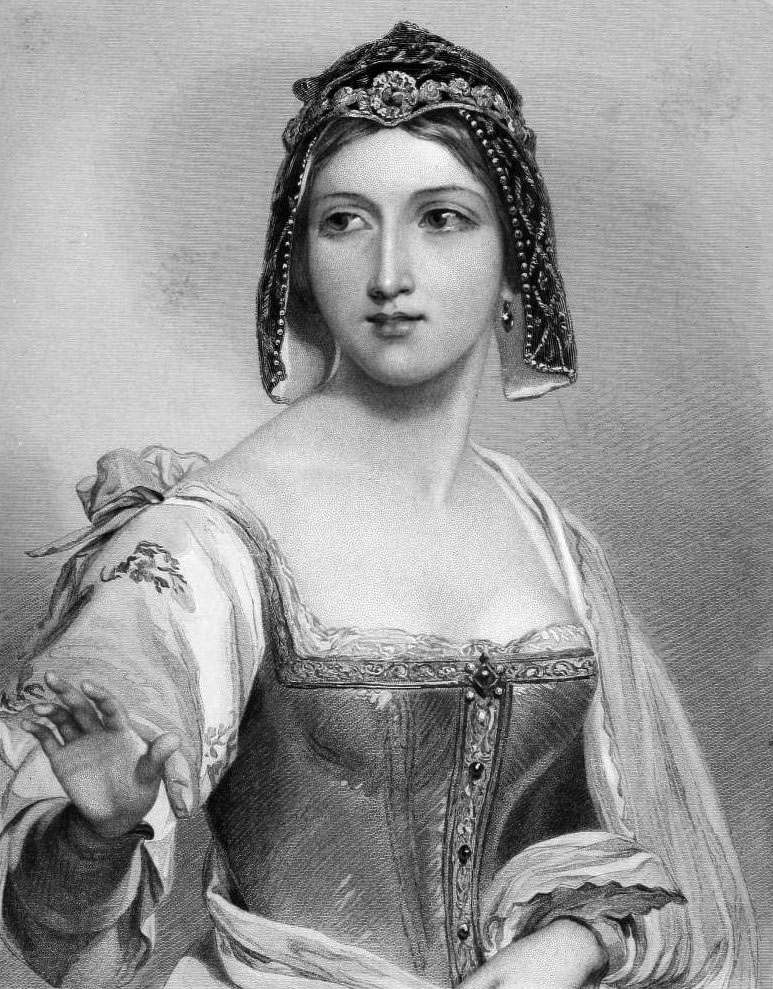
Silvia (character from "The Two Gentlemen of Verona", 1849, engraving after John William Wright)

Heath was successful in business, with some serious difficulties, but in the 1840s encountered cash flow problems, and sold stock from his back catalogue to stay afloat. He persisted in trying to interest the Bank of England in engraving work, though paper money was less needed after the end of the Napoleonic Wars. Henry Corbould as designer. Charles Heath (engraver), and George Heath (financial backer) contracted for paper money and postage stamps with several governments. The Penny Black was designed by William Wyon, Corbould and Heath.

Among Heath's pupils were George Thomas Doo (1800–1886), William Henry Mote (1803–1871), and James Henry Watt (1799–1867).

== Works ==
Heath received training in engraving from his father James, and his first known etching dates from when he was six years old. It was from his father that he learnt how to produce small plates suitable for book illustration. He was a noted if self-regarding illustrator of the Waverley Novels, and engraved Christ healing the Sick in the Temple, one of Benjamin West's big scriptural paintings. After Richard Westall, he engraved illustrations to Lord Byron's poems, published in 1819.

As an engraver, Heath exhibited at the Royal Academy and Suffolk Street Gallery from 1801 to 1825. After 1828 he produced little work of his own, but his studio was productive through his pupils Doo and Watt, and his sons. Thomas Garner was taken on by the studio in the 1820s, to work uncredited on annuals. As did his competitor Edward Finden, Heath outsourced work to a substantial group of engravers into the 1830s and 1840s, and employed a production line technique with division of labour.

Heath initially commissioned, and the studio produced, the engraved series Picturesque Views in England and Wales by J. M. W. Turner, eventually running to 100 watercolours by Turner for a part publishing project from 1827 to 1838. This collection has been considered a central part of Turner's opus, by Andrew Wilton, but in business terms was not a great success in its time.

== Family ==
Heath married his cousin Elizabeth Petch. Two of their sons, Frederick (1810–1878) and Alfred (1812–1896), were engravers and another, Henry Charles Heath (1829–1898), was a miniature painter who portrayed Queen Victoria and other members of the royal family. Their daughter Fanny Jemima (died 1850) married in 1839 Edward Henry Corbould, son of Henry Corbould.
