= Gift book =

Type of 19th-century book

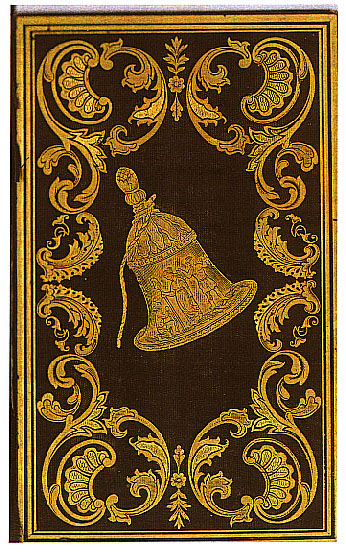
Cover for The Liberty Bell, 1848

Gift books, literary annuals, or keepsakes were 19th-century books, often lavishly decorated, which collected essays, short fiction, and poetry. They were primarily published in the autumn, in time for the holiday season and were intended to be given away rather than read by the purchaser. They were often printed with the date of the coming new year, but copyrighted with the actual year of publication.

== History ==
Gift books first appeared in England in the 1820s. They were modelled after the long-established literary almanacs published in France and Germany such as the Almanach des Muses (1765–1833) and Schiller's Musen-Almanach (1796–1800), but lacked some of the critical prestige of their Continental counterparts. The first known example is Rudolph Ackermann's Forget Me Not, subtitled a Christmas and New Year’s Present for 1823, published in November 1822. It was decoratively bound and came in a slipcase. It was successful, and by 1832 there were sixty-three different annual gift books being published in England. In 1826, The Atlantic Souvenir was the first American annual published.

Many gift books were among the first periodicals to pay contributors and editors regularly. This was a draw to many writers, many of whom tailored their work to suit the readers of these types of publications.

Some of the more important annuals of the time were the Opal, Talisman, the Magnolia, the Gift, the Liberty Bell (an abolitionist work) and The Token. The era of the gift book did not outlast the 19th century; in England most ceased publication before 1860.

The Illustrated London News parodies of 1842 (vol. 1, p. 521) focused their attacks on four popular annuals: Friendship's Offerings, The Book of Beauty, Forget-Me-Not and The Keepsake, and mimicked the poetry of these books, inverting the sentiment and twisting the illustrations. ("My pretty blue-bell, I'm going to tell..." instead of "My pretty blue-bell, I'll never tell...") The American Book of Beauty had contributed to the death of the annual, by including a story of prison torture followed by an etching of a well-dressed woman holding a lap dog. They published this book several times, sometimes with the etchings in different orders or including additional William Henry Mote etchings.

The Victorian gift book market emerged in a time of mass-production, increased literacy, and growing demand of middle-class buyers. Most gift books were made from 1855 to 1875, the "golden age" of wood-engraved illustration. These books—explicitly intended to be given as gifts—were normally published in late November in time for Christmas. In spite of their intention as Christmas gifts, seasonal content was not the main criterion for gift books but, rather, they are characterized by ornamental bindings and intricate illustrations.

Gift book bindings are often bright and elaborately gilded. Gift books were a display of cultural capital and, in many cases, design took precedent over content, with an emphasis on the volumes being seen rather than read. Their emphasis on aesthetic form over content was criticized by contemporaries, but their visual and material qualities were a welcome addition to many middle-class domestic spaces. An anonymous critic for The Saturday Review wrote that, "Nobody expects or wishes for originality, or depth, or learning in a Christmas book. Hallam or Grote or Milman or Darwin is not what a Christmas book is made of..."

Almost all contained steel engravings, a new technology around 1820 which allowed mass production, and of which the expense was offset by the potential for resale and reuse. Watercolor became popular in the 1830s, and the black-and-white etchings allowed people of ordinary skill to color in and display these book plates, which gave more legs to the fad. In 1844 there was an article referring to it as imbecilic mania, and finally an "Obituary for the Annual" appeared in the Art Journal of 1857. The new cheaper illustration techniques of the 1860s could not produce the same illustrations (usually well dressed women, with long dresses with sharp facial details).

== Editors ==
Many of the most popular and well-known gift books were edited by women, including Sarah Josepha Hale, Maria Weston Chapman, Lydia Maria Child, Alice and Phoebe Cary, the Countess of Blessington, and Lydia Sigourney. The annual The Token, which began in 1828 and lasted fifteen years, was edited by Samuel Griswold Goodrich. Because of the prevalence and popularity of gift books, he referred to the time period as the "Age of Annuals".

== Features ==
The material included in the books tended to be entirely "proper" prose and poetry, usually of a sentimental or religious nature, often by well-known authors of the day, such as (in England) Mary Shelley, Charles Dickens, Lord Byron, Letitia Elizabeth Landon, Robert Southey, Walter Scott, William Wordsworth and Robert Browning, and (in America) authors such as Nathaniel Hawthorne, Lydia Maria Child, Edgar Allan Poe, John Greenleaf Whittier, Ralph Waldo Emerson, Frances S. Osgood and Henry Wadsworth Longfellow.

A notable feature of gift books was their decorative aspect. They featured increasingly lavish bindings, ranging from glazed paper to embossed silk or embossed and inlaid leather with mother of pearl. Their size increased over time as well as their interior decoration. Pages often featured flowery borders, and the books were copiously illustrated with engravings or colored plates. An inscription plate was often included for the gift giver to inscribe to the recipient.

The material included was usually original but sometimes in the cheaper volumes may have been reprinted. Usually the books included the year in the title but in some cases, this was omitted, and the publisher would sell the volume's remainders the next year. In some cases an old annual would be reprinted with a new name, or with just the lead article and some illustration plates changed, or even renamed using a more popular name from a rival publisher. These practices sometimes make it difficult to construct correct bibliographies, and may have been one reason why "the whole tribe of annuals fell into something of disrepute".

== Illustrators ==
Book illustrations before the 1860s involved both an artist and an engraver. Both the artists' work and the engravers' "copy" had copyright protection in England. Sometimes the artist and the engraver were the same person. New technology made the profession of engraving obsolete (except for currency) around 1860.

Artists whose work illustrated these volumes included William Turner, Edwin Henry Landseer, Charles Lock Eastlake, John Cheney, and John Sartain. Many of the illustrations reproduced works by European artists of the Renaissance and later eras and served to make the works of these artists known to a much wider audience.

Engravers had their own art of taking a color painting and converting it to a black and white steel engraving (and also reversing it). These engravers often worked 12- to 16-hour days and each line was scratched by hand onto soft steel plate with a magnifying glass in one hand. One mistake could ruin an entire plate. There were a half dozen engravers in England that made this look easy, based on the volume of etchings produced. A few of these popular engravers were admitted to the Royal Academy, including William Henry Mote. Here, however, the engraver was sarcastically called a "copier" and thus was limited to the Royal Academy rank of Associate; they were also warned by against "piracy". However, the engraver was the highest paid entity of a book production (but based on hours worked, he was the lowest paid). Most annuals had engravings of portraits. Today, as in the 19th century, the engravers do not get much credit, and their "art" can now be done in photo editing software. The Wall Street Journal uses a photo etching technique to put etchings in every edition. These old engravings often go unsold on eBay today, but in the 1836 auction of some plates the winning bid was £420,000 (adjusted for 2010 inflation). Some of these plates have been found in London antique stores and still exist today, and are much cheaper today than in 1836. Some have been scrapped for scrap metal, as the old plates might weigh 50 lbs or more.

== Images ==
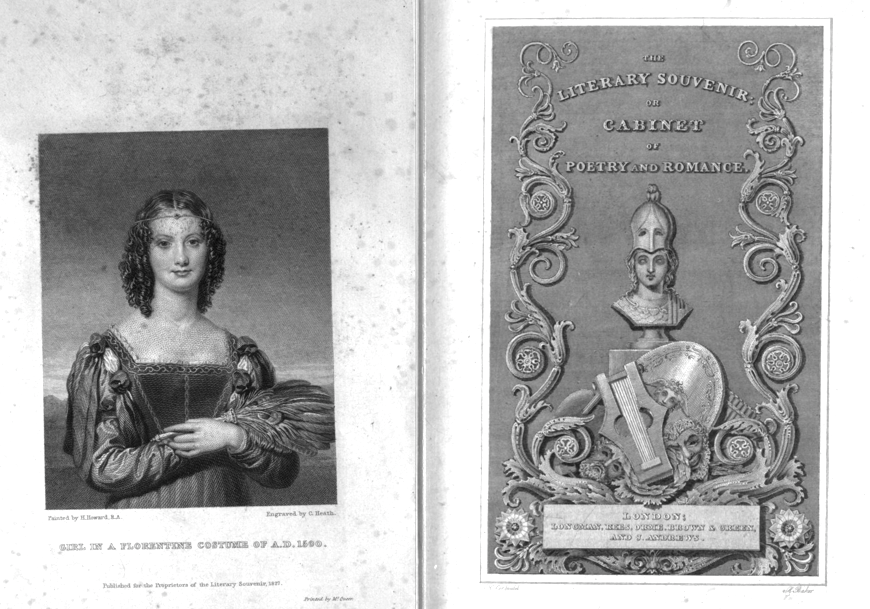
The Literary Souvenir, London, 1827

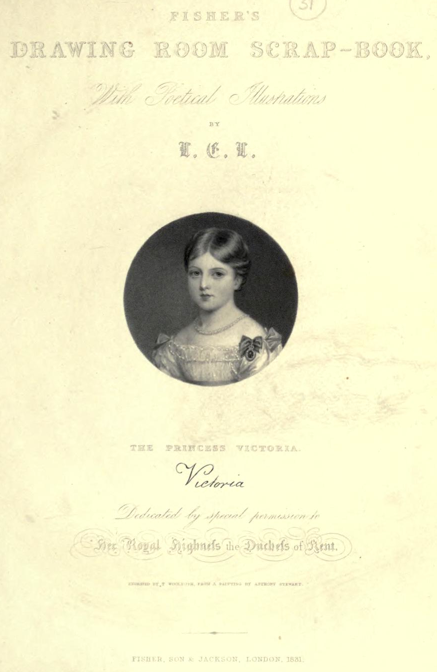
Fishers Drawing Room Scrap Book, London, 1832

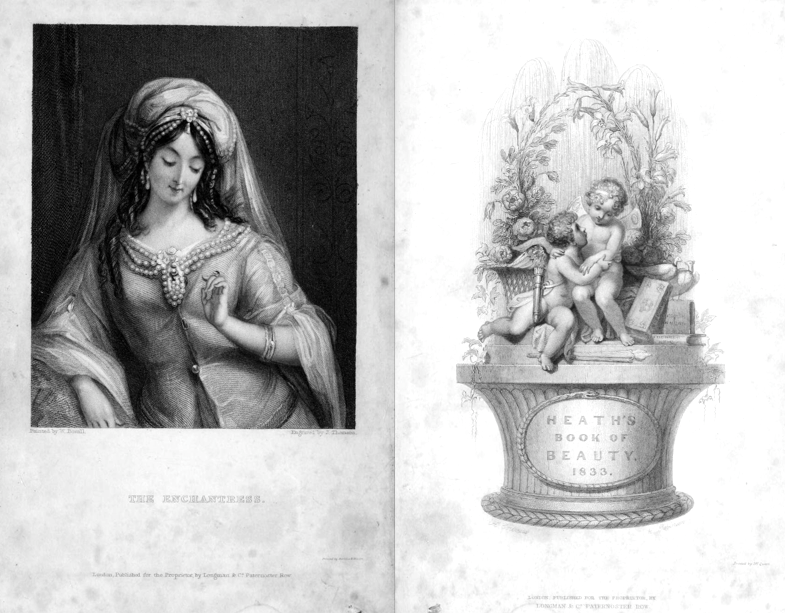
Heath's Book of Beauty, London, 1833

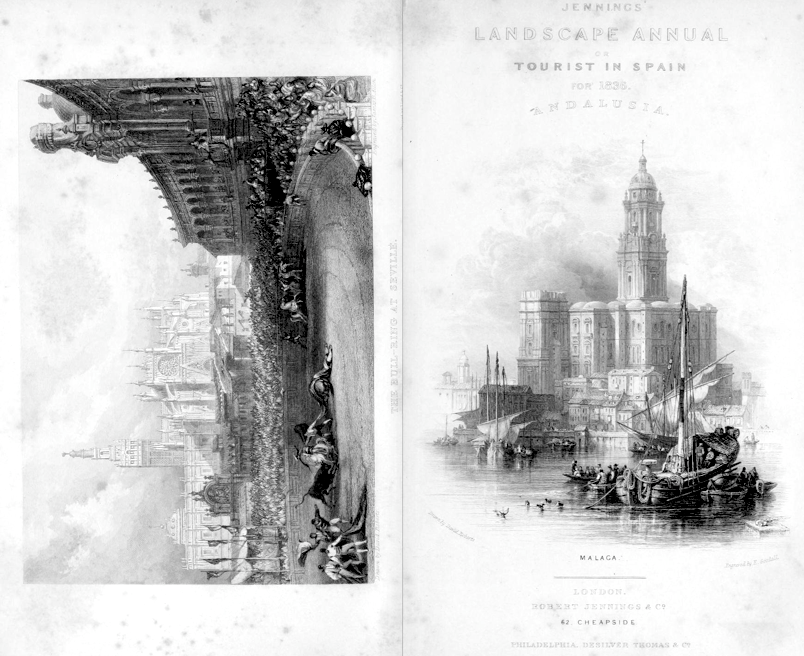
Jenning's Landscape Annual, London, 1836

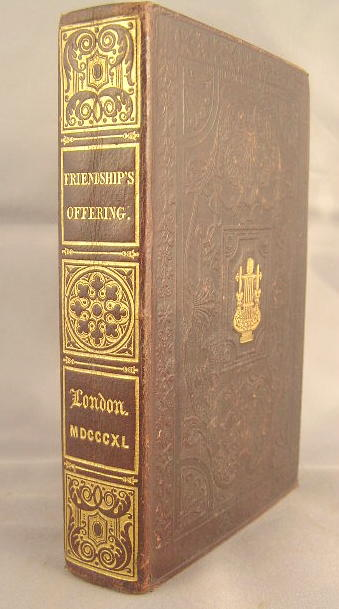
Friendship's Offering, London, 1840

Princess Mary's Gift Book, London, 1914
