= The Keepsake =

British literary annual

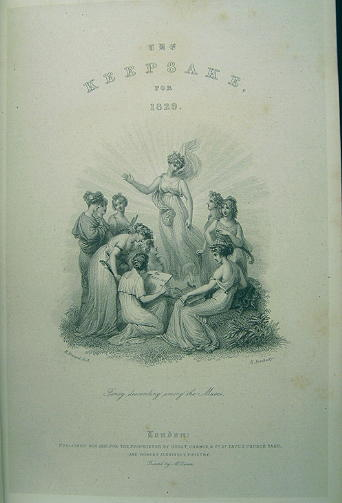
The Keepsake for MDCCCXXIX (1829) – frontispiece, which repeats publisher data from the title page

The Keepsake was an English literary annual which ran from 1828 to 1857, published each Christmas from 1827 to 1856, for perusal during the year of the title. Like other literary annuals, The Keepsake was an anthology of short fiction, poetry, essays, and engraved illustrations. It was a gift book designed to appeal to young women, and was distinctive for its binding of scarlet dress silk and the quality of its illustrations. Although the literature in The Keepsake and other annuals is often regarded as second-rate, many of the contributors to The Keepsake are canonical authors of the Romantic period.

== Publication history ==
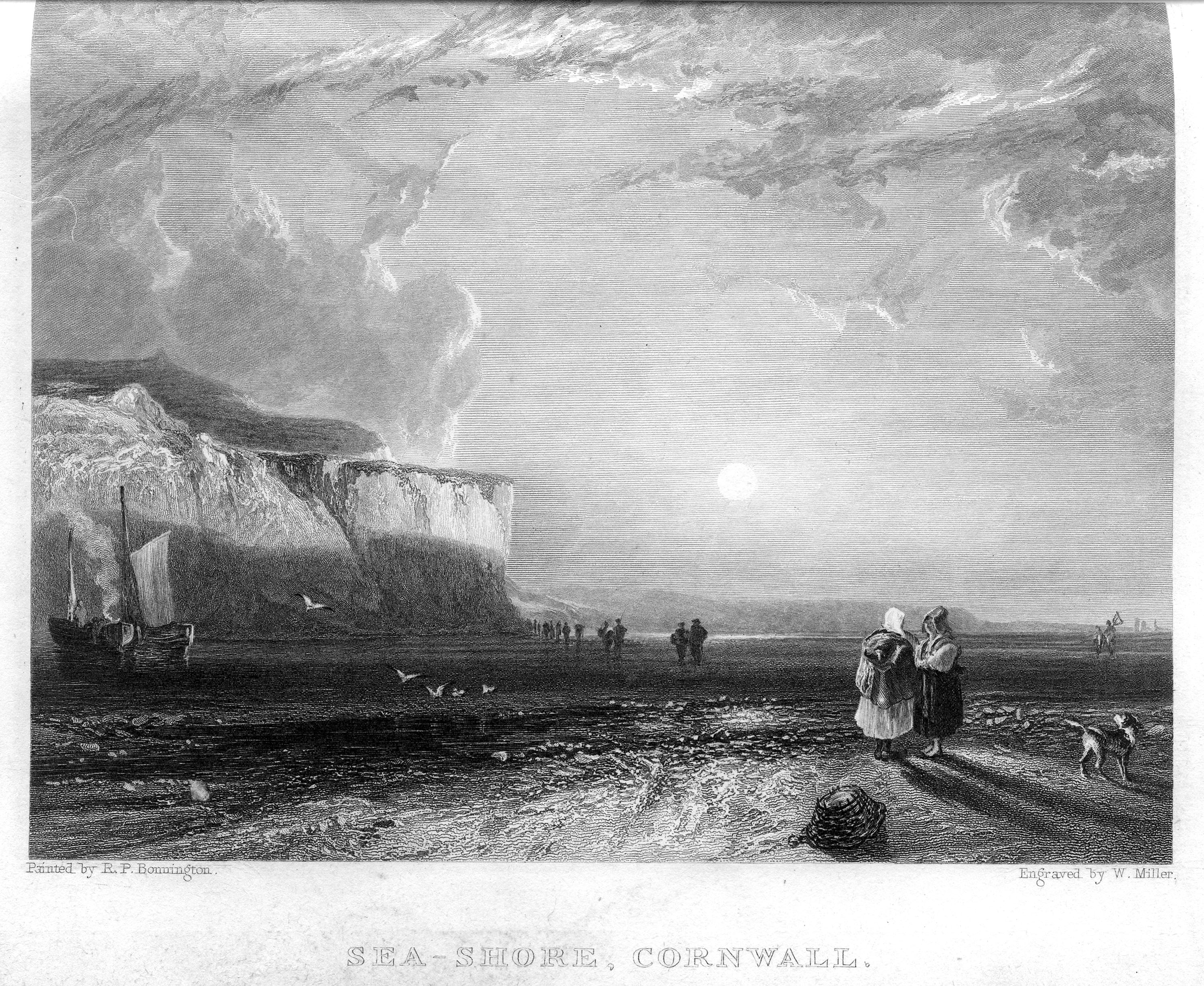
The Seashore. Cornwall engraving by William Miller after R. P. Bonington, published in The Keepsake for MDCCCXXXI (1831)

The first edition of The Keepsake was initiated by the engraver Charles Heath, who initially approached the publisher John Murray but entered an agreement with another publisher, Hurst, Chance, and Co., to publish the first volume.

=== Editors ===
William Harrison Ainsworth edited The Keepsake for 1828. Frederic Mansel Reynolds (c. 1800 to 1850) took over the editorship for the 1829 to 1835 volumes and again for 1838 and 1839. Caroline Norton edited The Keepsake for 1836, followed by Lady Emmeline Stuart-Wortley for the 1837 and 1840 volumes. Marguerite Gardiner, Countess of Blessington, edited The Keepsake for 1841 to 1849. She was succeeded by Marguerite Agnes Power, who edited the annual from 1850 to the final volume in 1857.

=== Publishers ===
The Keepsake was published in London for its full run, and some volumes were also published in Paris, Berlin, and Frankfurt. Its London publishers were Hurst, Chance, & Co.; Jennings and Chaplin; Longman, Rees, Orme, Brown, Green, and Longman (in the Longman line); and David Bogue. In Paris, it was published by Rittner and Goupill, Delloy & Co., Fisher & Co., Aubert & Co., L. Curmer, Fisher, Son, & Co., and H. Mandeville. Other continental editions were published by Charles Jugil in Frankfurt, A. Asher in Berlin, and T. O. Weigel in Leipsic. American editions of The Keepsake were published in New York by D. Appleton & Company and in Philadelphia by Lea and Blanchard.

=== Production ===
The intensely competitive market for gift books drove innovations in book production. The Keepsake's high-quality illustrations were created with steel plates, which were more durable than the copper plates that were more commonly used in the 1830s, and therefore could produce larger editions before being replaced. These illustrations were often commissioned before the short stories, poems, or essays that they were to accompany.

=== Contributors ===
The Keepsake for 1829 is particularly notable for its contributors, which included the most popular authors and artists of the day, many of whose works now comprise the Romantic literary canon. Well known contributors to this volume include Mary Shelley, Thomas Moore, Walter Scott, Samuel Taylor Coleridge, William Wordsworth, Felicia Hemans, Letitia Elizabeth Landon and Robert Southey.

The editors of The Keepsake offered generous compensation to its authors, but many were hesitant to publish their work in The Keepsake or other annuals because these publications were not well respected by critics.

== The Keepsake for 1828 ==
The first annual was edited by William Harrison Ainsworth. It was published by subscription. The names of the contributors were not listed, but they included Felicia Hemans, Percy Shelley, Letitia Landon, and Ainsworth himself.

== The Keepsake for 1829 ==
Following the Table of Contents is this List of Contributors (all caps, no italics):

Sir Walter Scott, Sir James Mackintosh, Thomas Moore, Lord Normanby, Lord Morpeth, Lord Porchester, Lord Holland, Lord F. L. Gower, Lord Nugent, W. Wordsworth, R. Southey, S. T. Coleridge, William Roscoe, Percy Bysshe Shelley, Henry Luttrell, Theodore Hook, J. G. Lockhart, T. Crofton Croker, R. Bernal, M. P., Thomas Haynes Bayly, W. Jerdan, Mrs. Hemans, Miss Landon, M. L., Barry St. Leger, James Boaden, W. H. Harrison, F. Mansel Reynolds, and the authors of Frankenstein, The Roué, and The O'Hara Tales.

"Miss Landon" is L. E. L., or Letitia Elizabeth Landon. Reynolds is the editor of this second annual volume and several later ones, credited on the title page as Frederic Mansel Reynolds.

The volume contains four works, all prose, by Walter Scott as "the Author of Waverley". The first three are now known as The Keepsake Stories.

- "My Aunt Margaret's Mirror"
- "The Tapestried Chamber, or The Lady in the Sacque"
- "Death of the Laird's Jock"
- "Description of the Engraving Entitled [line break] A Scene at Abbotsford"

Mary Shelley's contributions are "The Sisters of Albano" and "Ferdinando Eboli", two stories "by the author of Frankenstein". Wordsworth's are "The Country Girl", "The Triad", "The Wishing-Gate", and sonnets. Coleridge contributed "The Garden of Boccacio" and some epigrams. Felicia Hemans contributed "The Broken Chain" and Letitia Landon,"The Altered River" and her "Verses" on Georgiana, Duchess of Bedford.
