= Google's Ideological Echo Chamber =

2017 manifesto on workplace diversity

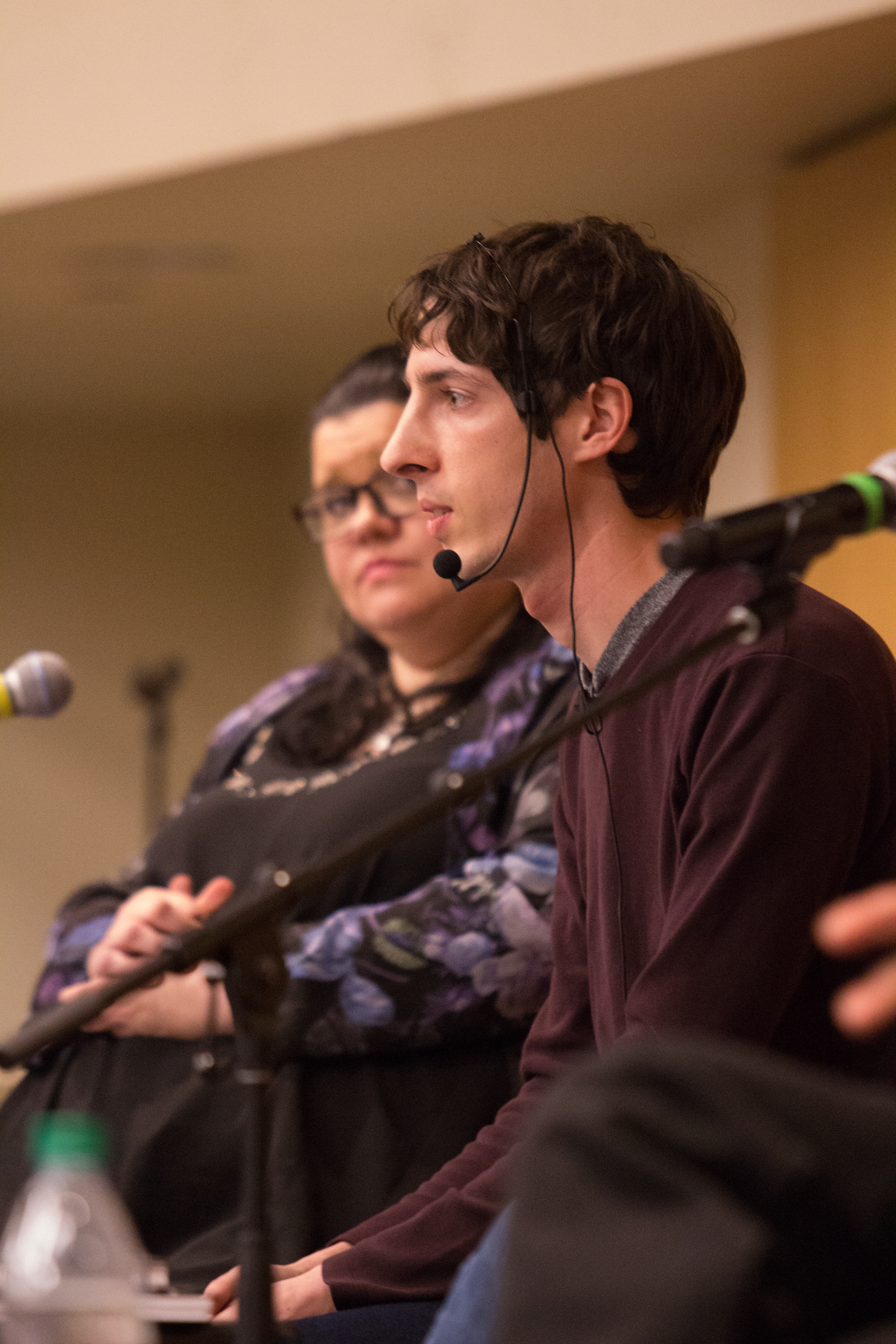
James Damore at Portland State University in 2018

"Google's Ideological Echo Chamber: How bias clouds our thinking about diversity and inclusion", commonly referred to as the Google memo, is an internal memo, dated July 2017, by US-based Google engineer James Damore (/dəˈmɔːr/) about Google's culture and diversity policies. The memo and Google's subsequent firing of Damore in August 2017 became a subject of interest for the media. Damore's arguments received both praise and criticism from media outlets, scientists, academics and others.

The company fired Damore for violation of the company's code of conduct. Damore filed a complaint with the National Labor Relations Board, but later withdrew this complaint. A lawyer with the NLRB wrote that his firing did not violate Federal employment laws, as most employees in the United States can be fired at the employer's discretion. After withdrawing this complaint, Damore filed a class action lawsuit, retaining the services of attorney Harmeet Dhillon, alleging that Google was discriminating against conservatives, Whites, Asians, and men. Damore withdrew his claims in the lawsuit to pursue arbitration against Google.

== Course of events ==
James Damore wrote the memo after a Google diversity program he attended solicited feedback. The memo was written on a flight to China. Calling the culture at Google an "ideological echo chamber", the memo states that, although discrimination exists, it is extreme to ascribe all disparities to oppression, and it is authoritarian to try to correct disparities through reverse discrimination. Instead, the memo argues that male to female disparities can be partly explained by biological differences. Alluding to the work of Simon Baron-Cohen, Damore said that those differences include women generally having a stronger interest in people than in things, and tending to be more social, artistic, and prone to neuroticism (a higher-order personality trait). Damore's memorandum also suggests ways to adapt the tech workplace to those differences to increase women's representation and comfort, without resorting to discrimination.

The memo is dated July 2017 and was originally shared on an internal mailing list. It was later updated with a preface affirming the author's opposition to workplace sexism and stereotyping. On August 5, a version of the memo (omitting sources and graphs) was published by Gizmodo. The memo's publication resulted in controversy across social media, and in public criticism of the memo and its author from some Google employees. According to Wired, Google's internal forums showed some support for Damore, who said he received private thanks from employees who were afraid to come forward.

Damore was fired remotely by Google on August 7, 2017. The same day, prior to being fired, Damore filed a complaint with the National Labor Relations Board. The complaint is marked as "8(a)(1) Coercive Statements (Threats, Promises of Benefits, etc.)". A subsequent statement from Google asserted that its executives were unaware of the complaint when they fired Damore; it is illegal to fire an employee in retaliation for an NLRB complaint. Following his firing, Damore announced he would pursue legal action against Google.

Google's VP of Diversity, Danielle Brown, responded to the memo on August 8: "Part of building an open, inclusive environment means fostering a culture in which those with alternative views, including different political views, feel safe sharing their opinions. But that discourse needs to work alongside the principles of equal employment found in our Code of Conduct, policies, and anti-discrimination laws". Google's CEO Sundar Pichai wrote a note to Google employees, supporting Brown's formal response, and adding that much of the document was fair to debate. His explanation read "to suggest a group of our colleagues have traits that make them less biologically suited to that work is offensive and not OK ... At the same time, there are co-workers who are questioning whether they can safely express their views in the workplace (especially those with a minority viewpoint). They too feel under threat, and that is also not OK." Anonymously-placed physical ads criticizing Pichai and Google for the firing were put up shortly after. Damore characterized the response by Google executives as having "shamed" him for his views. CNN described the fallout as "perhaps the biggest setback to what has been a foundational premise for [Google] employees: the freedom to speak up about anything and everything".

Damore gave interviews to Bloomberg Technology and to the YouTube channels of Canadian professor Jordan Peterson and podcaster Stefan Molyneux. Damore stated that he wanted his first interviews to be with media who were not hostile. He wrote an op-ed in The Wall Street Journal, detailing the history of the memo and Google's reaction, followed by interviews with Reason, Reddit's "IAmA" section, CNN, CNBC, Business Insider, Joe Rogan, Dave Rubin, Milo Yiannopoulos, and Ben Shapiro.

In response to the memo, Google's CEO planned an internal "town hall" meeting, fielding questions from employees on inclusivity. The meeting was cancelled a short time before it was due to start, over safety concerns as "our Dory questions appeared externally this afternoon, and on some websites, Googlers are now being named personally". Outlets found to be posting these names, with pictures, included 4chan, Breitbart News, and Milo Yiannopoulos's blog. Danielle Brown, Google's VP for diversity, was harassed online, and temporarily disabled her Twitter account.

Damore withdrew his complaint with the National Labor Relations Board before the board released any official findings. However, shortly before the withdrawal, an internal NLRB memo found that his firing was legal. The memo, which was not released publicly until February 2018, said that, whereas the law shielded him from being fired solely for criticizing Google, it did not protect discriminatory statements, that his memo's "statements regarding biological differences between the sexes were so harmful, discriminatory, and disruptive as to be unprotected", and that these "discriminatory statements", not his criticisms of Google, were the reason for his firing.

After withdrawing his complaint with the National Labor Relations Board, Damore and another ex-Google employee instead shifted focus to a class action lawsuit accusing Google of various forms of discrimination against conservatives, White people, and men. In October 2018, Damore and the other former Google employee dismissed their claims in the lawsuit, in order to pursue private arbitration against Google. Another engineer, Tim Chevalier, later filed a lawsuit against Google claiming that he was terminated in part for criticizing Damore's memo on Google's internal message boards.

Damore and Google came to an undisclosed settlement and agreed to dismiss the lawsuit in 2020.

== Reactions on the science ==
Some commentators in the academic community said Damore had understood the science correctly, such as leading psychologist Steven Pinker, Debra W. Soh, a columnist and psychologist; Lee Jussim, a professor of social psychology at Rutgers University; and Geoffrey Miller, an evolutionary psychology professor at University of New Mexico.

Others said that he had got the science wrong and relied on data that was suspect, outdated, irrelevant, or otherwise flawed; these included the neurobiologist Gina Rippon; evolutionary biologist Suzanne Sadedin; and Rosalind Barnett, a psychologist at Brandeis University.

David P. Schmitt, former professor of psychology at Bradley University, said that while some sex differences are "small to moderate" in size and not relevant to occupational performance at Google, "culturally universal sex differences in personal values and certain cognitive abilities are a bit larger in size, and sex differences in occupational interests are quite large. It seems likely these culturally universal and biologically-linked sex differences play some role in the gendered hiring patterns of Google employees."

British journalist Angela Saini said that Damore failed to understand the research he cited, while American journalist John Horgan criticized the track record of evolutionary psychology and behavioral genetics. Columnist for The Guardian Owen Jones said that the memo was "guff dressed up with pseudo-scientific jargon" and cited a former Google employee saying that it failed to show the desired qualities of an engineer. Feminist journalist Louise Perry in her book The Case Against the Sexual Revolution comments on the affair saying that she is sympathetic to Damore and that the science he quotes is perfectly sound.

Alice H. Eagly, professor of psychology at Northwestern University, wrote "As a social scientist who's been conducting psychological research about sex and gender for almost 50 years, I agree that biological differences between the sexes likely are part of the reason we see fewer women than men in the ranks of Silicon Valley's tech workers. But the road between biology and employment is long and bumpy, and any causal connection does not rule out the relevance of nonbiological causes."

== Impact on Google ==
Prior to his interview with Damore, Steve Kovach interviewed a female Google employee for Business Insider who said she objected to the memo, saying it lumped all women together, and that it came across as a personal attack. Business Insider also reported that several women were preparing to leave Google by interviewing for other jobs. Within Google, the memo sparked discussions among staff, some of whom believe they were disciplined or fired for their comments supporting diversity or for criticizing Damore's beliefs.

== Concerns about sexism ==
In addition to Sheryl Sandberg, who linked to scientific counterarguments, a number of other women in technology condemned the memorandum, including Megan Smith, a former Google vice president. Susan Wojcicki, CEO of YouTube, wrote an editorial in which she described feeling devastated about the potential effect of the memo on young women. Laurie Leshin, president of the Worcester Polytechnic Institute, said that she was heartened by the backlash against the memo, which gave her hope that things were changing. Kara Swisher of Recode criticized the memo as sexist; Cynthia B. Lee, a computer science lecturer at Stanford University stated that there is ample evidence for bias in tech and that correcting this was more important than whether biological differences might account for a proportion of the numerical imbalances in Google and in technology.

Cathy Young in USA Today said that while the memo had legitimate points, it mischaracterized some sex differences as being universal, while Google's reaction to the memo was harmful since it fed into arguments that men are oppressed in modern workplaces. Libertarian author Megan McArdle, writing for Bloomberg View, said that Damore's claims about differing levels of interest between the sexes reflected her own experiences.

Christina Cauterucci of Slate drew parallels between arguments from Damore's memo and those of men's rights activists., while UC Law legal scholar Joan C. Williams expressed concerns about the prescriptive language used by some diversity training programs and recommended that diversity initiatives be phrased in problem-solving terms.

== Employment law and free speech concerns ==
Yuki Noguchi, a reporter for NPR (National Public Radio), said that Damore's firing has raised questions regarding the limits of free speech in the workplace. First Amendment free speech protections usually do not extend into the workplace, as the First Amendment restricts government action but not the actions of private employers, and employers have a duty to protect their employees against a hostile work environment.

Several employment law experts interviewed by CNBC said that while Damore could challenge his firing in court, his potential case would be weak and Google would arguably have several defensible reasons for firing him; had Google not made a substantive response to his memo, that could have been cited as evidence of a "hostile work environment" in lawsuits against Google. Additionally, they argued that the memo could indicate that Damore would be unable to fairly assess or supervise the work of female colleagues.

== Cultural commentary ==
Google's reaction to the memo and its firing of Damore were criticized by several cultural commentators, including Margaret Wente of The Globe and Mail, Erick Erickson, a conservative writer for RedState, David Brooks of The New York Times, Clive Crook of Bloomberg View, and moral philosopher Peter Singer, writing in New York Daily News.

Others objected to the intensity of the broader response to the memo in the media and across the internet, such as CNN's Kirsten Powers, Conor Friedersdorf of The Atlantic, and Jesse Singal, writing in The Boston Globe.

== See also ==
- Biological determinism
- Cancel culture
- Criticism of Google
- Gender disparity in computing
- Neuroscience of sex differences
- Resistance to diversity efforts in organizations
- Sex differences in psychology
- Sexism in the technology industry
- Women in computing
- Women in STEM
