= Mary Wollstonecraft =

English writer and philosopher (1759–1797)

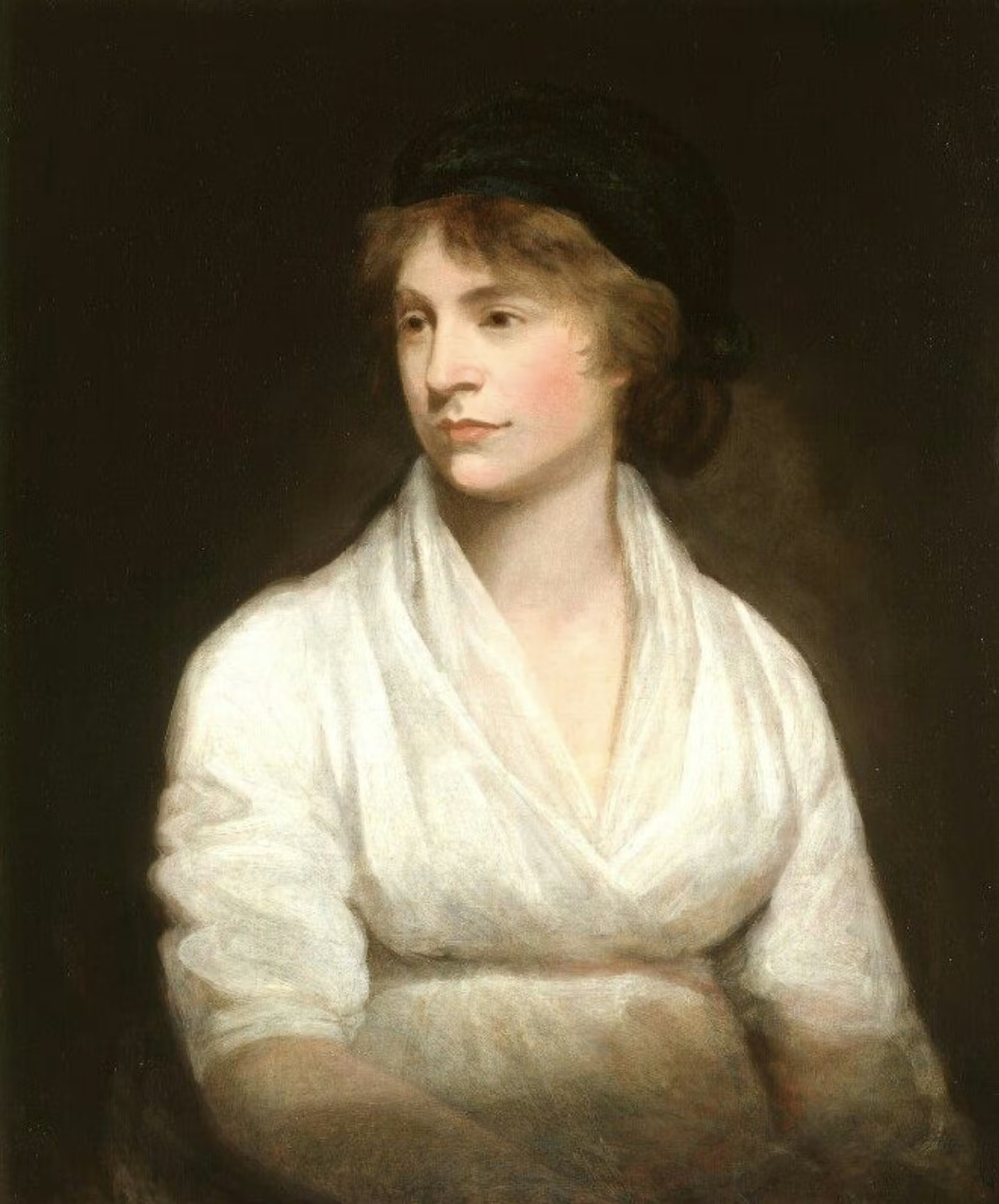
- c. 1797 portrait
- Born: 27 April 1759; Spitalfields, London, England
- Died: 10 September 1797 (aged 38); Somers Town, London, England
- Spouse: William Godwin (m. 1797)
- Partners: Henry Fuseli; Gilbert Imlay
- Children: Frances "Fanny" Imlay; Mary Shelley
- Writing career
- Notable work: A Vindication of the Rights of Woman

Mary Wollstonecraft (/ˈwʊlstənkræft/; 27 April 1759 – 10 September 1797) was an English writer and philosopher best known for her advocacy of women's rights. Until the late twentieth century, Wollstonecraft's life, which encompassed several unconventional (at the time) personal relationships, received more attention than her writing. Wollstonecraft is regarded as one of the founding feminist philosophers, and feminists often cite both her life and her works as important influences.

During her brief career she wrote novels, treatises, a travel narrative, a history of the French Revolution, a conduct book, and a children's book. Wollstonecraft is best known for A Vindication of the Rights of Woman (1792), in which she argues that women are not naturally inferior to men but appeared to be only because they lack education. She suggests that both men and women should be treated as rational beings and imagines a social order founded on reason.

After two ill-fated affairs, with Henry Fuseli and Gilbert Imlay (by whom she had a daughter, Fanny Imlay), Wollstonecraft married the philosopher William Godwin, one of the forefathers of the anarchist movement. Wollstonecraft died at the age of 38, leaving behind several unfinished manuscripts. She died 11 days after giving birth to her second daughter, Mary, who became an accomplished writer and the author of Frankenstein.

Wollstonecraft's widower published a Memoir (1798) of her life, revealing her unorthodox lifestyle, which inadvertently destroyed her reputation for almost a century. However, with the emergence of the feminist movement at the turn of the twentieth century, Wollstonecraft's advocacy of women's equality and critiques of conventional femininity were increasingly recognized.

== Biography ==
=== Early life ===
Wollstonecraft was born on 27 April 1759 in Spitalfields, London. She was the second of the seven children of Elizabeth Dixon and Edward John Wollstonecraft. Although her family had a comfortable income when she was a child, her father gradually squandered it on speculative projects. Consequently, the family became financially unstable and they were frequently forced to move during Wollstonecraft's youth. The family's financial situation eventually became so dire that Wollstonecraft's father compelled her to turn over money that she would have inherited at her maturity. Moreover, he was apparently a violent man who would beat his wife in drunken rages. As a teenager, Wollstonecraft used to lie outside the door of her mother's bedroom to protect her. Wollstonecraft played a similar maternal role for her sisters, Everina and Eliza, throughout her life. In a defining moment in 1784, she persuaded Eliza, who was suffering from what was probably postpartum depression, to leave her husband and infant; Wollstonecraft made all of the arrangements for Eliza to flee, demonstrating her willingness to challenge social norms. The human costs, however, were severe: her sister suffered social condemnation and, because she could not remarry, was doomed to a life of poverty and hard work.

Two friendships shaped Wollstonecraft's early life. The first was with Jane Arden in Beverley. The two frequently read books together and attended lectures presented by Arden's father, a self-styled philosopher and scientist. Wollstonecraft revelled in the intellectual atmosphere of the Arden household and valued her friendship with Arden greatly, sometimes to the point of being emotionally possessive. Wollstonecraft wrote to her: "I have formed romantic notions of friendship ... I am a little singular in my thoughts of love and friendship; I must have the first place or none." In some of Wollstonecraft's letters to Arden, she reveals the volatile and depressive emotions that would haunt her throughout her life. The second and more important friendship was with Fanny (Frances) Blood, introduced to Wollstonecraft by the Clares, a couple in Hoxton who became parental figures to her; Wollstonecraft credited Blood with opening her mind.

Unhappy with her home life, Wollstonecraft struck out on her own in 1778 and accepted a job as a lady's companion to Sarah Dawson, a widow living in Bath. However, Wollstonecraft had trouble getting along with the irascible woman (an experience she drew on when describing the drawbacks of such a position in Thoughts on the Education of Daughters, 1787). In 1780 she returned home upon being called back to care for her dying mother. Rather than return to Dawson's employ after the death of her mother, Wollstonecraft moved in with the Bloods. She realized during the two years she spent with the family that she had idealized Blood, who was more invested in traditional feminine values than was Wollstonecraft. But Wollstonecraft remained dedicated to Fanny and her family throughout her life, frequently giving pecuniary assistance to Blood's brother.

Wollstonecraft had envisioned living in a female utopia with Blood; they made plans to rent rooms together and support each other emotionally and financially, but this dream collapsed under economic realities. In order to make a living, Wollstonecraft, her sisters and Blood set up a school together in Newington Green, a Dissenting community. Blood soon became engaged and, after her marriage, moved to Lisbon, Portugal with her husband, Hugh Skeys, in hopes that it would improve her health which had always been precarious. Despite the change of surroundings Blood's health further deteriorated when she became pregnant, and in 1785 Wollstonecraft left the school and followed Blood to nurse her, but to no avail. Moreover, her abandonment of the school led to its failure. Blood's death devastated Wollstonecraft and was part of the inspiration for her first novel, Mary: A Fiction (1788).

=== "The first of a new genus" ===
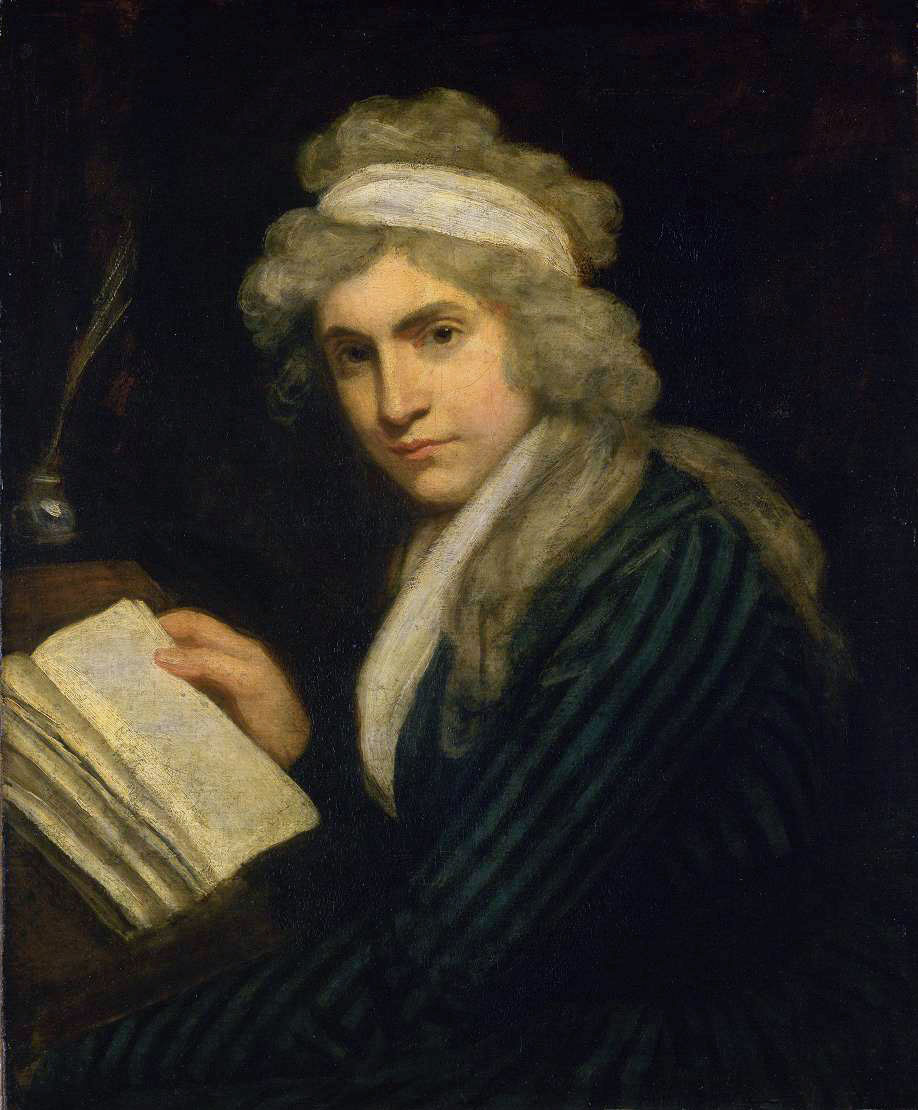
Wollstonecraft in 1790–1791, by John Opie

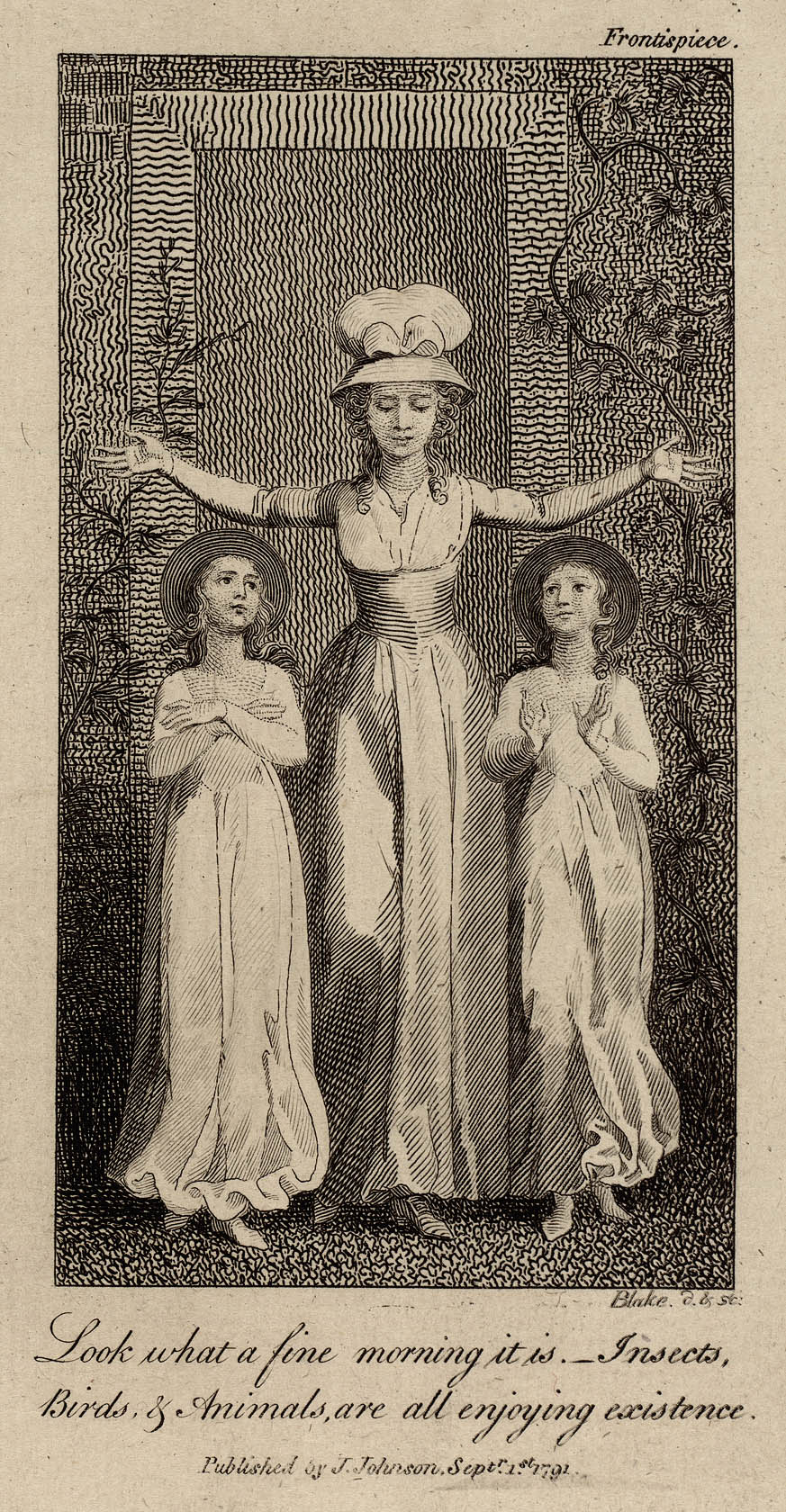
Frontispiece to the 1791 edition of Original Stories from Real Life engraved by William Blake

After Blood's death in 1785, Wollstonecraft's friends helped her obtain a position as governess to the daughters of the Anglo-Irish Kingsborough family in Ireland. Although she could not get along with Lady Kingsborough, the children found her an inspiring instructor; one of the daughters, Margaret King, would later say she "had freed her mind from all superstitions". Some of Wollstonecraft's experiences during this year would make their way into her only children's book, Original Stories from Real Life (1788).

Frustrated by the limited career options open to respectable yet poor women—an impediment which Wollstonecraft eloquently describes in the chapter of Thoughts on the Education of Daughters titled "Unfortunate Situation of Females, Fashionably Educated, and Left Without a Fortune", she decided, after only a year as a governess, to embark upon a career as an author, a radical choice, as, at the time, few women could support themselves by writing. As she wrote to her sister Everina in 1787, she was trying to become "the first of a new genus". She moved to London and, assisted by the liberal publisher Joseph Johnson, found a place to live and work to support herself. She learned French and German and translated texts, most notably Of the Importance of Religious Opinions by Jacques Necker and Elements of Morality, for the Use of Children by Christian Gotthilf Salzmann. She also wrote reviews, primarily of novels, for Johnson's periodical, the Analytical Review. Wollstonecraft's intellectual universe expanded during this time, not only from the reading that she did for her reviews but also from the company she kept: she attended Johnson's famous dinners and met the radical pamphleteer Thomas Paine and the philosopher William Godwin. The first time Godwin and Wollstonecraft met, they were disappointed in each other. Godwin had come to hear Paine, but Wollstonecraft assailed him all night long, disagreeing with him on nearly every subject. Johnson himself, however, became much more than a friend; she described him in her letters as a father and a brother.

In London, Wollstonecraft lived on Dolben Street, in Southwark; an up-and-coming area following the opening of the first Blackfriars Bridge in 1769. While in London, she pursued a relationship with the artist Henry Fuseli, even though he was already married. She was, she wrote, enraptured by his genius, "the grandeur of his soul, that quickness of comprehension, and lovely sympathy". She proposed a platonic living arrangement with Fuseli and his wife, but Fuseli's wife was appalled, and he broke off the relationship with Wollstonecraft. After Fuseli's rejection, Wollstonecraft decided to travel to France to escape the humiliation of the incident, and to participate in the revolutionary events that she had just celebrated in her recent Vindication of the Rights of Men (1790). She had written the Rights of Men in response to the Whig MP Edmund Burke's politically conservative critique of the French Revolution in Reflections on the Revolution in France (1790) and it made her famous overnight. Reflections on the Revolution in France was published on 1 November 1790, and so angered Wollstonecraft that she spent the rest of the month writing her rebuttal. A Vindication of the Rights of Men, in a Letter to the Right Honourable Edmund Burke was published on 29 November 1790, initially anonymously; the second edition of A Vindication of the Rights of Men was published on 18 December, and this time the publisher revealed Wollstonecraft as the author.

Wollstonecraft called the French Revolution a "glorious chance to obtain more virtue and happiness than hitherto blessed our globe". Against Burke's dismissal of the Third Estate as men of no account, Wollstonecraft wrote, "Time may show, that this obscure throng knew more of the human heart and of legislation than the profligates of rank, emasculated by hereditary effeminacy". About the events of 5–6 October 1789, when the royal family was marched from Versailles to Paris by a group of angry housewives, Burke praised Queen Marie Antoinette as a symbol of the refined elegance of the ancien régime, who was surrounded by "furies from hell, in the abused shape of the vilest of women". Wollstonecraft by contrast wrote of the same event: "Probably you [Burke] mean women who gained a livelihood by selling vegetables or fish, who never had any advantages of education".

Wollstonecraft was compared with such leading lights as the theologian and controversialist Joseph Priestley and Paine, whose Rights of Man (1791) would prove to be the most popular of the responses to Burke. She pursued the ideas she had outlined in Rights of Men in A Vindication of the Rights of Woman (1792), her most famous and influential work, that built on earlier efforts of members of the Blue Stockings Society Wollstonecraft's growing fame extended across the English channel, for when the French statesman Charles Maurice de Talleyrand-Périgord visited London in 1792, he visited her, during which she asked that French girls be given the same right to an education that French boys were being offered by the new regime in France.

=== France ===
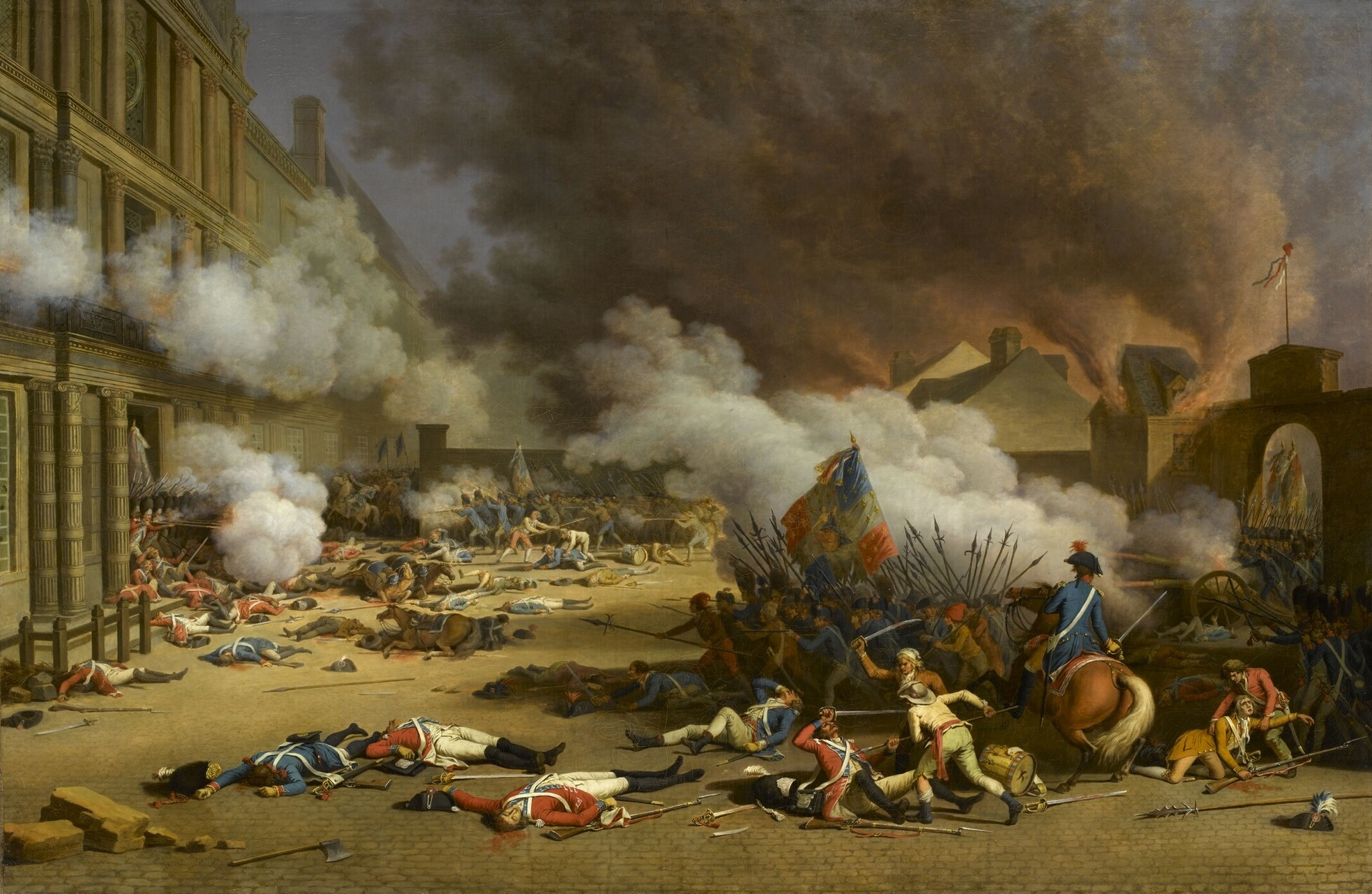
The insurrection of 10 August 1792

Wollstonecraft left for Paris in December 1792, and arrived about a month before Louis XVI was guillotined. Britain and France were on the brink of war when she left for Paris, and many advised her not to go. France was in turmoil. She sought out other British visitors such as Helen Maria Williams and joined the circle of expatriates then in the city. During her time in Paris, Wollstonecraft associated mostly with the moderate Girondins rather than the more radical Jacobins. It was indicative that when Archibald Hamilton Rowan, the United Irishman, encountered her in the city in 1794 it was at a post-Terror festival in honour of the moderate revolutionary leader Mirabeau, who had been a great hero for Irish and English radicals before his death in April 1791.

On 26 December 1792, Wollstonecraft saw the former king, Louis XVI, being taken to be tried before the National Assembly, and much to her own surprise, found "the tears flow[ing] insensibly from my eyes, when I saw Louis sitting, with more dignity than I expected from his character, in a hackney coach going to meet death, where so many of his race have triumphed".

France declared war on Britain in February 1793. Wollstonecraft tried to leave France for Switzerland but was denied permission. The Jacobin faction increased in power, and in March the formation of the Committee of Public Safety and the Revolutionary Tribunal were symptomatic of an increasingly totalitarian regime. Life became very difficult for foreigners in France. At first, they were put under police surveillance and, to get a residency permit, had to produce six written statements from Frenchmen testifying to their loyalty to the republic. Then, on 12 April 1793, all foreigners were forbidden to leave France. Despite her sympathy for the revolution, life for Wollstonecraft become very uncomfortable, all the more so as the Girondins had lost out to the Jacobins. Some of Wollstonecraft's French friends lost their heads to the guillotine as the Jacobins set out to annihilate their enemies.

=== Gilbert Imlay, the Reign of Terror, and her first child ===
Having just written the Rights of Woman, Wollstonecraft was determined to put her ideas to the test, and in the stimulating intellectual atmosphere of the French Revolution, she attempted her most experimental romantic attachment yet: she met and fell passionately in love with Gilbert Imlay, an American adventurer. Wollstonecraft put her own principles in practice by sleeping with Imlay even though they were not married, which was widely viewed as unacceptable behaviour for a "respectable" woman. Whether or not she was interested in marriage, he was not, and she appears to have fallen in love with an idealization of Imlay. Despite her rejection of the sexual component of relationships in the Rights of Woman, Wollstonecraft discovered that Imlay awakened her interest in sex.

Wollstonecraft was to a certain extent disillusioned by what she saw in France, writing that the people under the republic still behaved slavishly to those who held power while the new French government remained "venal" and "brutal". Despite her disenchantment, Wollstonecraft wrote:

I cannot yet give up the hope, that a fairer day is dawning on Europe, though I must hesitatingly observe, that little is to be expected from the narrow principle of commerce, which seems everywhere to be shoving aside the point of honour of the noblesse [nobility]. For the same pride of office, the same desire of power are still visible; with this aggravation, that, fearing to return to obscurity, after having but just acquired a relish for distinction, each hero, or philosopher, for all are dubbed with these new titles, endeavors to make hay while the sun shines.

Wollstonecraft was offended by the Jacobins' treatment of women. They refused to grant women equal rights, denounced "Amazons", and made it clear that women were supposed to conform to Jean-Jacques Rousseau's ideal of helpers to men. On 16 October 1793, Marie Antoinette was guillotined; among her charges and convictions, she was found guilty of committing incest with her son. Though Wollstonecraft disliked the former queen, she was troubled that the Jacobins would make Marie Antoinette's alleged perverse sexual acts one of the central reasons for the French people to hate her.

As the daily arrests and executions of the Reign of Terror began, Wollstonecraft came under suspicion due to being a British subject and friendly with leading Girondins. On 31 October 1793, most Girondin leaders were guillotined; when Imlay broke the news to Wollstonecraft, she fainted. By this time, Imlay was taking advantage of the Royal Navy's blockade of France, which had caused shortages and worsened inflation levels, by chartering ships to bring food and soap from the United States past the blockade which he could then sell at a premium in French markets. Imlay's blockade-running gained the respect and support of some Jacobins, ensuring, as he had hoped, his freedom during the Terror. To protect Wollstonecraft from arrest, Imlay made a false statement to the U.S. embassy in Paris that he had married her, automatically making her an American citizen. Some of her friends were not so lucky; many were arrested. Her sisters believed she had been imprisoned.

Wollstonecraft called life under the Jacobins "nightmarish". There were gigantic daytime parades requiring everyone to show themselves and lustily cheer lest they be suspected of inadequate commitment to the republic, as well as nighttime police raids to arrest "enemies of the republic". In a March 1794 letter to her sister Everina, Wollstonecraft wrote:

It is impossible for you to have any idea of the impression the sad scenes I have been a witness to have left on my mind ... death and misery, in every shape of terrour, haunts this devoted country—I certainly am glad that I came to France, because I never could have had else a just opinion of the most extraordinary event that has ever been recorded.

Wollstonecraft soon became pregnant by Imlay; on 14 May 1794, she gave birth to her first child, Fanny, naming her after perhaps her closest friend. Wollstonecraft was overjoyed; she wrote to a friend, "My little Girl begins to suck so MANFULLY that her father reckons saucily on her writing the second part of the R[igh]ts of Woman" (emphasis hers). She continued to write avidly, despite not only her pregnancy and the burdens of being a new mother alone in a foreign country, but also the growing tumult of the French Revolution. While at Le Havre in northern France, she wrote a history of the early revolution, An Historical and Moral View of the French Revolution, which was published in London in December 1794. Imlay, unhappy with the domestic-minded and maternal Wollstonecraft, eventually left her. He promised that he would return to her and Fanny at Le Havre, but his delays in writing to her and his long absences convinced Wollstonecraft that he had found another woman. Her letters to him are full of needy expostulations, which most critics explain as the expressions of a deeply depressed woman, while others say they resulted from her circumstances—a foreign woman alone with an infant in the middle of a revolution that had seen good friends imprisoned or executed.

=== The fall of the Jacobins and An Historical and Moral View of the French Revolution ===
In July 1794, Wollstonecraft welcomed the fall of the Jacobins, predicting it would be followed with a restoration of freedom of the press in France, which led her to return to Paris. In August 1794, Imlay departed for London and promised to return soon. In 1793, the first Pitt ministry had begun a crackdown on British radicals, suspending civil liberties, imposing drastic censorship and trying anyone suspected of sympathising with the revolution with treason, which led Wollstonecraft to fear she would be imprisoned if she returned to England.

The winter of 1794–1795 was the coldest winter in Europe for over a century, which reduced Wollstonecraft and her daughter Fanny to desperate circumstances. The river Seine froze that winter, which made it impossible for ships to bring food and coal to Paris, leading to widespread starvation and deaths from the cold in the city. Wollstonecraft continued to write to Imlay, asking him to return to France at once, declaring she still had faith in the revolution and did not wish to return to England. After she left France on 7 April 1795, she continued to refer to herself as "Mrs. Imlay", even to her sisters, in order to bestow legitimacy upon her child.

British historian Tom Furniss called An Historical and Moral View of the French Revolution the most neglected of Wollstonecraft's books. It was first published in London in 1794, but a second edition did not appear until 1989. Later generations were more interested in her feminist writings than in her account of the French Revolution, which Furniss has called her "best work". Wollstonecraft was not trained as a historian, but she used all sorts of journals, letters and documents recounting how ordinary people in France reacted to the revolution. She was trying to counteract what Furniss called the "hysterical" anti-revolutionary mood in Britain, which depicted the revolution as due to the entire French nation going mad. Wollstonecraft argued instead that the revolution arose from a set of social, economic and political conditions that left no other way out of the crisis that gripped France in 1789.

An Historical and Moral View of the French Revolution was a difficult balancing act for Wollstonecraft. She condemned the Jacobin regime and the Reign of Terror, but at same time she argued that the revolution was a great achievement, which led her to stop her history in late 1789 rather than write about the Terror of 1793–94. Edmund Burke had ended his Reflections on the Revolution in France with reference to the events of 5–6 October 1789, when a group of women from Paris forced the French royal family from the Palace of Versailles to Paris. Burke called the women "furies from hell", while Wollstonecraft defended them as ordinary housewives angry about the lack of bread to feed their families. Against Burke's idealized portrait of Marie Antoinette as a noble victim of a mob, Wollstonecraft portrayed the queen as a femme fatale, a seductive, scheming and dangerous woman. Wollstonecraft argued that the values of the French aristocracy corrupted women in a monarchy because women's main purpose in such a society was to bear sons to continue a dynasty, which essentially reduced a woman's value to only her womb. Moreover, Wollstonecraft pointed out that unless a queen was a queen regnant, most queens were queen consorts, which meant a woman had to exercise influence via her husband or son, encouraging her to become more and more manipulative. Wollstonecraft argued that aristocratic values, by emphasizing a woman's body and her ability to be charming over her mind and character, had encouraged women like Marie Antoinette to be manipulative and ruthless, making the queen into a corrupted and corrupting product of the ancien régime.

In Biographical Memoirs of the French Revolution (1799), the strongly anti-Jacobin historian John Adolphus condemned Wollstonecraft's work as a "rhapsody of libellous declamations" and took particular offence at her depiction of Louis XVI.

=== England and William Godwin ===
Seeking Imlay, Wollstonecraft returned to London in April 1795, but he rejected her. In May 1795, she attempted to commit suicide, probably with laudanum. Imlay saved her life, but it is unclear how. In a last attempt to win back Imlay, she embarked upon some business negotiations for him in Scandinavia, trying to locate a Norwegian captain who had absconded with silver that Imlay was trying to get past the British blockade of France. Wollstonecraft undertook this hazardous trip with only her young daughter and Marguerite, her maid. She recounted her travels and thoughts in letters to Imlay, many of which were eventually published as Letters Written in Sweden, Norway, and Denmark in 1796. When she returned to England and came to the full realisation that her relationship with Imlay was over, she attempted suicide for the second time, leaving a note for Imlay:

Let my wrongs sleep with me! Soon, very soon, shall I be at peace. When you receive this, my burning head will be cold ... I shall plunge into the Thames where there is the least chance of my being snatched from the death I seek. God bless you! May you never know by experience what you have made me endure. Should your sensibility ever awake, remorse will find its way to your heart; and, in the midst of business and sensual pleasure, I shall appear before you, the victim of your deviation from rectitude.

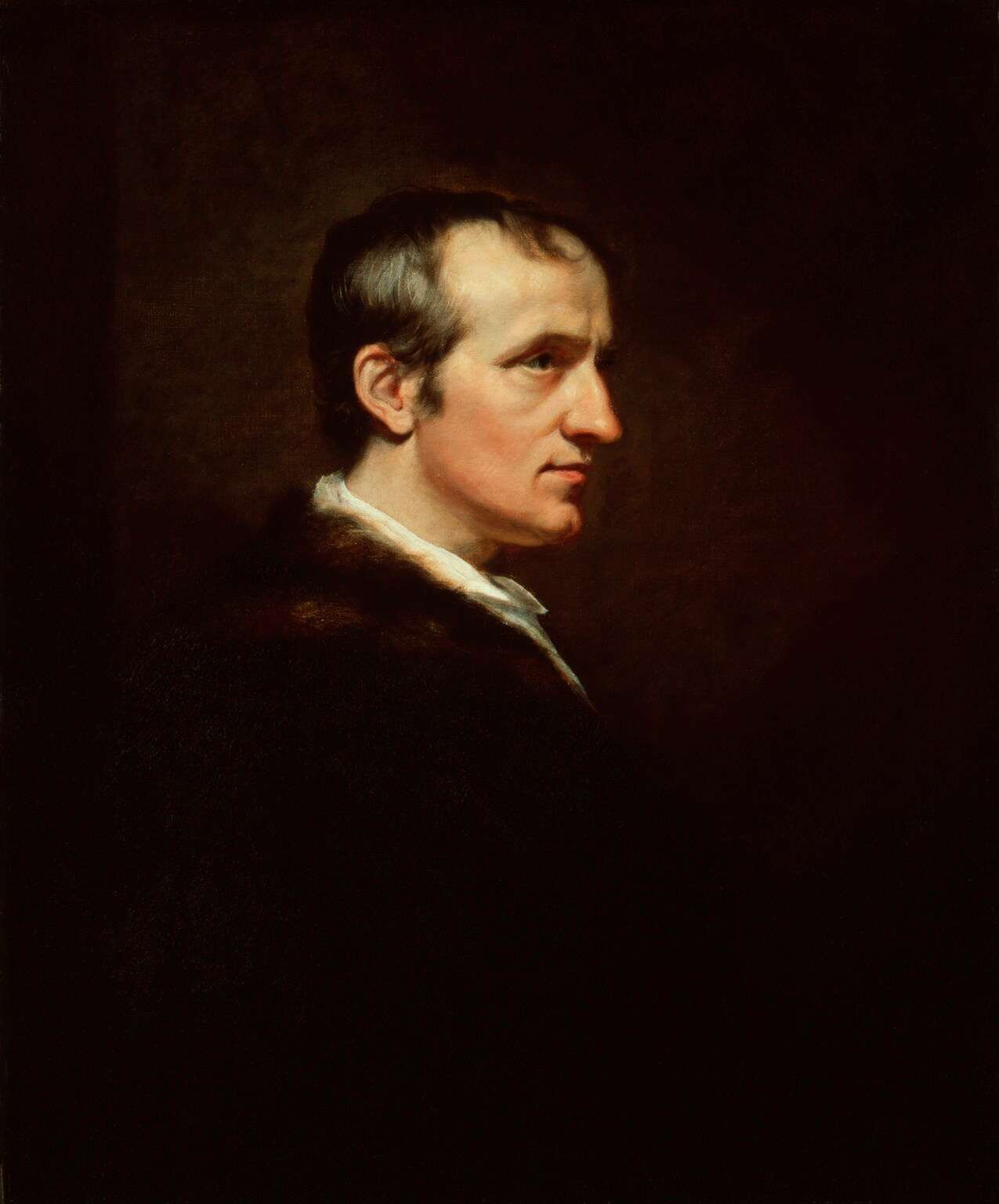
Portrait of William Godwin by James Northcote, oil on canvas, 1802

She then went out on a rainy night and "to make her clothes heavy with water, she walked up and down about half an hour" before jumping into the River Thames, but a stranger saw her jump and rescued her. Wollstonecraft considered her suicide attempt deeply rational, writing after her rescue

I have only to lament, that, when the bitterness of death was past, I was inhumanly brought back to life and misery. But a fixed determination is not to be baffled by disappointment; nor will I allow that to be a frantic attempt, which was one of the calmest acts of reason. In this respect, I am only accountable to myself. Did I care for what is termed reputation, it is by other circumstances that I should be dishonoured.

Gradually, Wollstonecraft returned to her literary life, becoming involved with Joseph Johnson's circle again, in particular with Mary Hays, Elizabeth Inchbald, and Sarah Siddons through William Godwin. Godwin and Wollstonecraft's unique courtship began slowly, but it eventually became a passionate love affair. Godwin had read her Letters Written in Sweden, Norway, and Denmark and later wrote that "If ever there was a book calculated to make a man in love with its author, this appears to me to be the book. She speaks of her sorrows, in a way that fills us with melancholy, and dissolves us in tenderness, at the same time that she displays a genius which commands all our admiration." Once Wollstonecraft became pregnant, they decided to marry so that their child would be legitimate. Their marriage revealed the fact that Wollstonecraft had never been married to Imlay, and as a result she and Godwin lost many friends. Godwin was further criticized because he had advocated the abolition of marriage in his philosophical treatise Political Justice. After their marriage on 29 March 1797, Godwin and Wollstonecraft moved to 29 The Polygon, Somers Town. Godwin rented an apartment 20 doors away at 17 Evesham Buildings in Chalton Street as a study, so that they could both still retain their independence; they often communicated by letter. By all accounts, theirs was a happy and stable, though brief, relationship.

=== Birth of daughter Mary and death ===
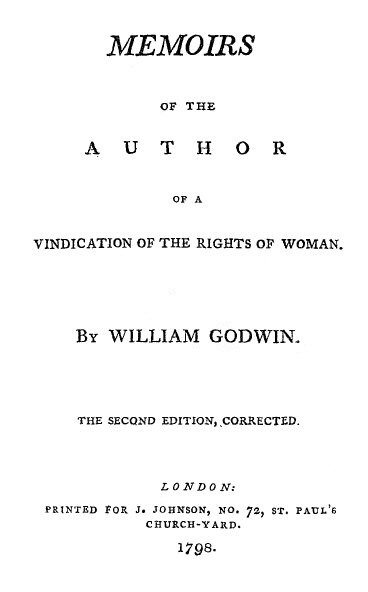
Title page for Godwin's Memoirs of the Author of A Vindication of the Rights of Woman (1798)

On 30 August 1797, Wollstonecraft gave birth to her second daughter, Mary. Although the delivery seemed to go well initially, the placenta broke apart during the birth and became infected; childbed fever (post-partum infection) was a common and often fatal occurrence in the eighteenth century. After several days of agony, Wollstonecraft died of septicaemia on 10 September. Godwin was devastated: he wrote to his friend Thomas Holcroft, "I firmly believe there does not exist her equal in the world. I know from experience we were formed to make each other happy. I have not the least expectation that I can now ever know happiness again." She was buried in the churchyard of St Pancras Old Church, where her tombstone reads "Mary Wollstonecraft Godwin, Author of A Vindication of the Rights of Woman: Born 27 April 1759: Died 10 September 1797."

== Posthumous, Godwin's Memoirs ==
In January 1798 Godwin published his Memoirs of the Author of A Vindication of the Rights of Woman. Although Godwin felt that he was portraying his wife with love, compassion, and sincerity, many readers were shocked that he would reveal Wollstonecraft's illegitimate children, love affairs, and suicide attempts. The Romantic poet Robert Southey accused him of "the want of all feeling in stripping his dead wife naked" and vicious satires such as The Unsex'd Females were published. Godwin's Memoirs portrays Wollstonecraft as a woman deeply invested in feeling who was balanced by his reason and as more of a religious sceptic than her own writings suggest. Godwin's views of Wollstonecraft were perpetuated throughout the nineteenth century and resulted in poems such as "Wollstonecraft and Fuseli" by British poet Robert Browning and that by William Roscoe which includes the lines:

Hard was thy fate in all the scenes of life
As daughter, sister, mother, friend, and wife;
But harder still, thy fate in death we own,
Thus mourn'd by Godwin with a heart of stone.

In 1851, Wollstonecraft's remains were moved by her grandson Sir Percy Shelley, 3rd Baronet, to his family tomb in St Peter's Church, Bournemouth.

== Legacy ==
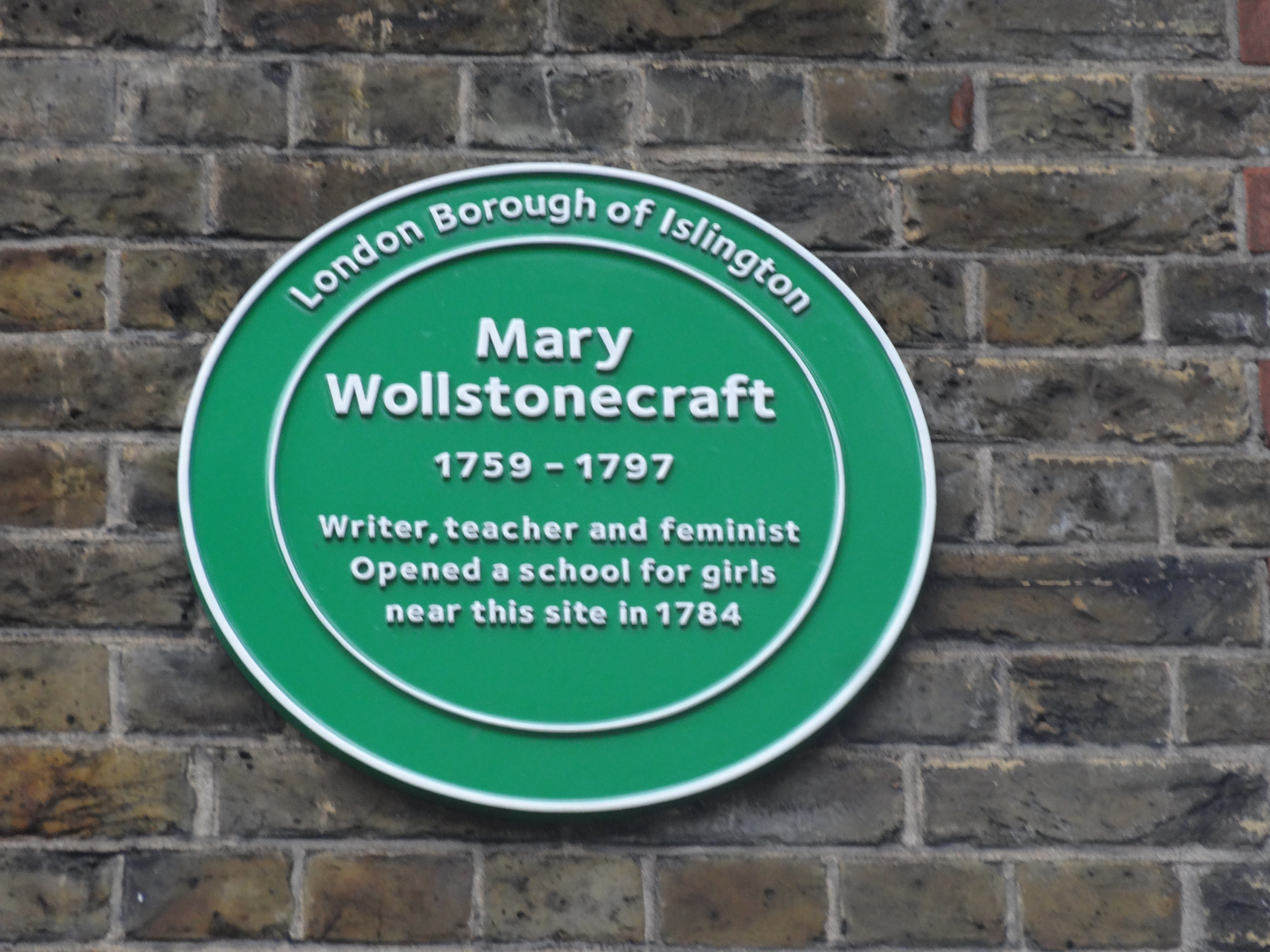
Green plaque on Newington Green Primary School, near the site of a school that Wollstonecraft, her sisters (Everina and Eliza), and Fanny Blood set up; the plaque was unveiled in 2011.

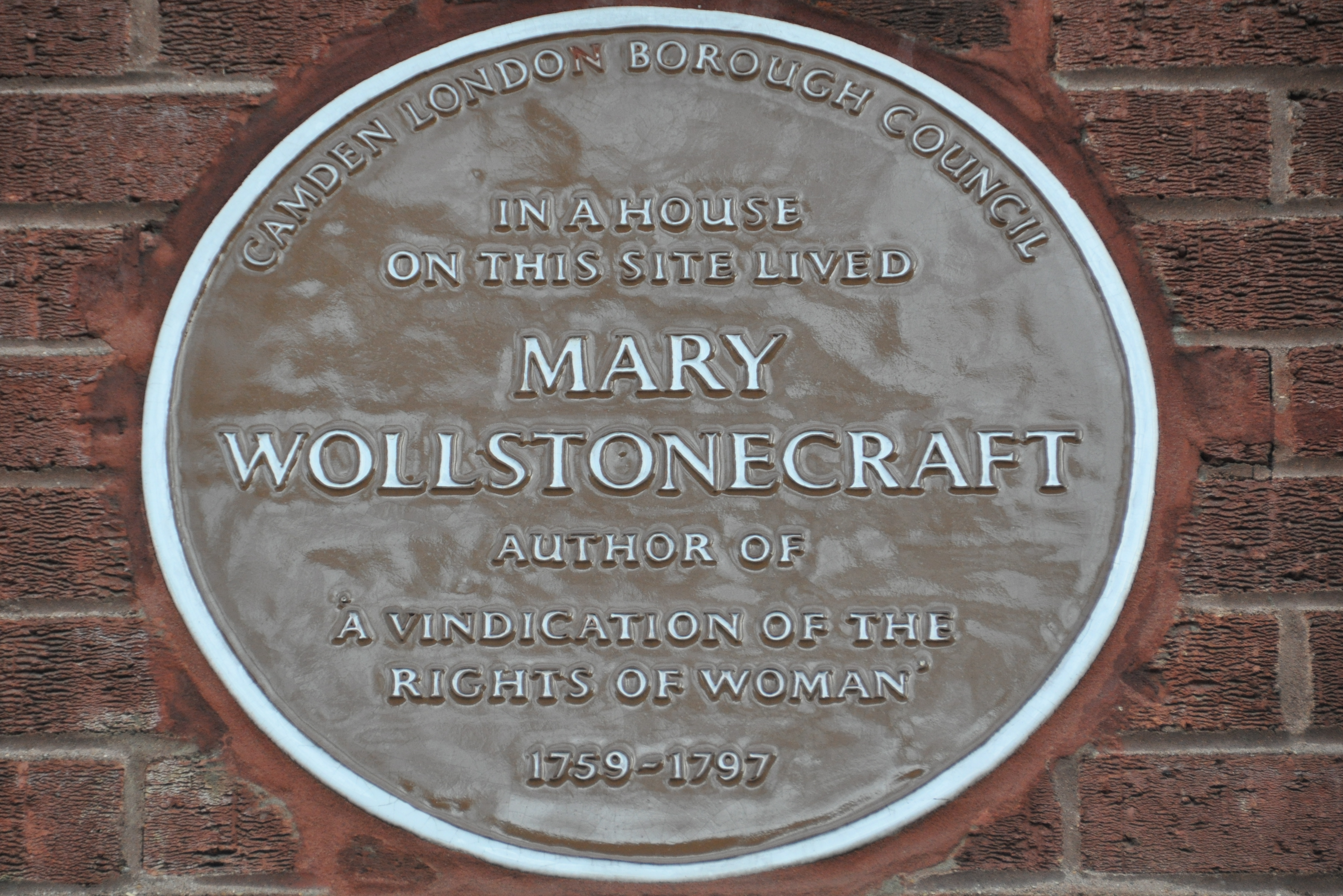
Plaque on Oakshott Court, near the site of her final home, The Polygon, Somers Town, London

Cora Kaplan describes Wollstonecraft's legacy as "curious", and further notes its evolution over time: "for an author-activist adept in many genres ... up until the last quarter-century Wollstonecraft's life has been read much more closely than her writing". After the devastating effect of Godwin's Memoirs, Wollstonecraft's reputation lay in tatters for nearly a century; she was pilloried by such writers as Maria Edgeworth, who patterned the "freakish" Harriet Freke in Belinda (1801) after her. Other novelists such as Mary Hays, Charlotte Smith, Fanny Burney, and Jane West created similar figures, all to teach a "moral lesson" to their readers. (Hays had been a close friend, and helped nurse her in her dying days.)

However, the author Mary Robinson, who was associated with both Godwin and Wollstonecraft, is noted for her support and admiration for Wollstonecraft, even amidst the controversy of Godwin's biography. In her 1799 pamphlet, Thoughts on the Condition of Women, Robinson describes Wollstonecraft as "an illustrious British female, (whose death has not been sufficiently lamented, but to whose genius posterity will render justice)". The poet Anna Seward admired Wollstonecraft and was largely positive towards Godwin's Memoirs, writing in 1798: "Bearing strong marks of impartial authenticity as to the character, sentiments, conduct, and destiny of a very extraordinary woman, they appear to be highly valuable."

Jane Austen never mentioned her by name, but several of her novels contain positive allusions to Wollstonecraft's work. The American literary scholar Anne K. Mellor notes several examples. In Pride and Prejudice, Mr. Wickham seems to be based upon the sort of man Wollstonecraft claimed that standing armies produce, while the sarcastic remarks of protagonist Elizabeth Bennet about "female accomplishments" closely echo Wollstonecraft's condemnation of these activities. The balance a woman must strike between feelings and reason in Sense and Sensibility follows what Wollstonecraft recommended in her novel Mary, while the moral equivalence Austen drew in Mansfield Park between slavery and the treatment of women in society back home tracks one of Wollstonecraft's favourite arguments. In Persuasion, Austen's characterization of Anne Eliot (as well as her late mother before her) as better qualified than her father to manage the family estate also echoes a Wollstonecraft thesis.

Scholar Virginia Sapiro states that few read Wollstonecraft's works during the nineteenth century as "her attackers implied or stated that no self-respecting woman would read her work". (Still, as Craciun points out, new editions of Rights of Woman appeared in the UK in the 1840s and in the US in the 1830s, 1840s, and 1850s.) If readers were few, then many were inspired; one such reader was Elizabeth Barrett Browning, who read Rights of Woman at age 12 and whose poem Aurora Leigh reflected Wollstonecraft's unwavering focus on education. Lucretia Mott, a Quaker minister, and Elizabeth Cady Stanton, Americans who met in 1840 at the World Anti-Slavery Convention in London, discovered they both had read Wollstonecraft, and they agreed upon the need for (what became) the Seneca Falls Convention, an influential women's rights meeting held in 1848. Another woman who read Wollstonecraft was George Eliot, a prolific writer of reviews, articles, novels, and translations. In 1855, she devoted an essay to the roles and rights of women, comparing Wollstonecraft and Margaret Fuller. Fuller was an American journalist, critic, and women's rights activist who, like Wollstonecraft, had travelled to the Continent and had been involved in the struggle for reform (in this case the 1849 Roman Republic)—and she had a child by a man without marrying him. Wollstonecraft's children's tales were adapted by Charlotte Mary Yonge in 1870.

Wollstonecraft's work was exhumed with the rise of the women's suffrage movement in the United Kingdom. First was an attempt at rehabilitation in 1879 with the publication of Wollstonecraft's Letters to Imlay, with prefatory memoir by Charles Kegan Paul. Then followed the first full-length biography, which was by Elizabeth Robins Pennell; it appeared in 1884 as part of a series by the Roberts Brothers on famous women. Millicent Garrett Fawcett, a suffragist and later president of the National Union of Women's Suffrage Societies, wrote the introduction to the centenary edition (i.e. 1892) of the Rights of Woman; it cleansed the memory of Wollstonecraft and claimed her as the foremother of the struggle for the vote. By 1898, Wollstonecraft was the subject of a first doctoral thesis and its resulting book.

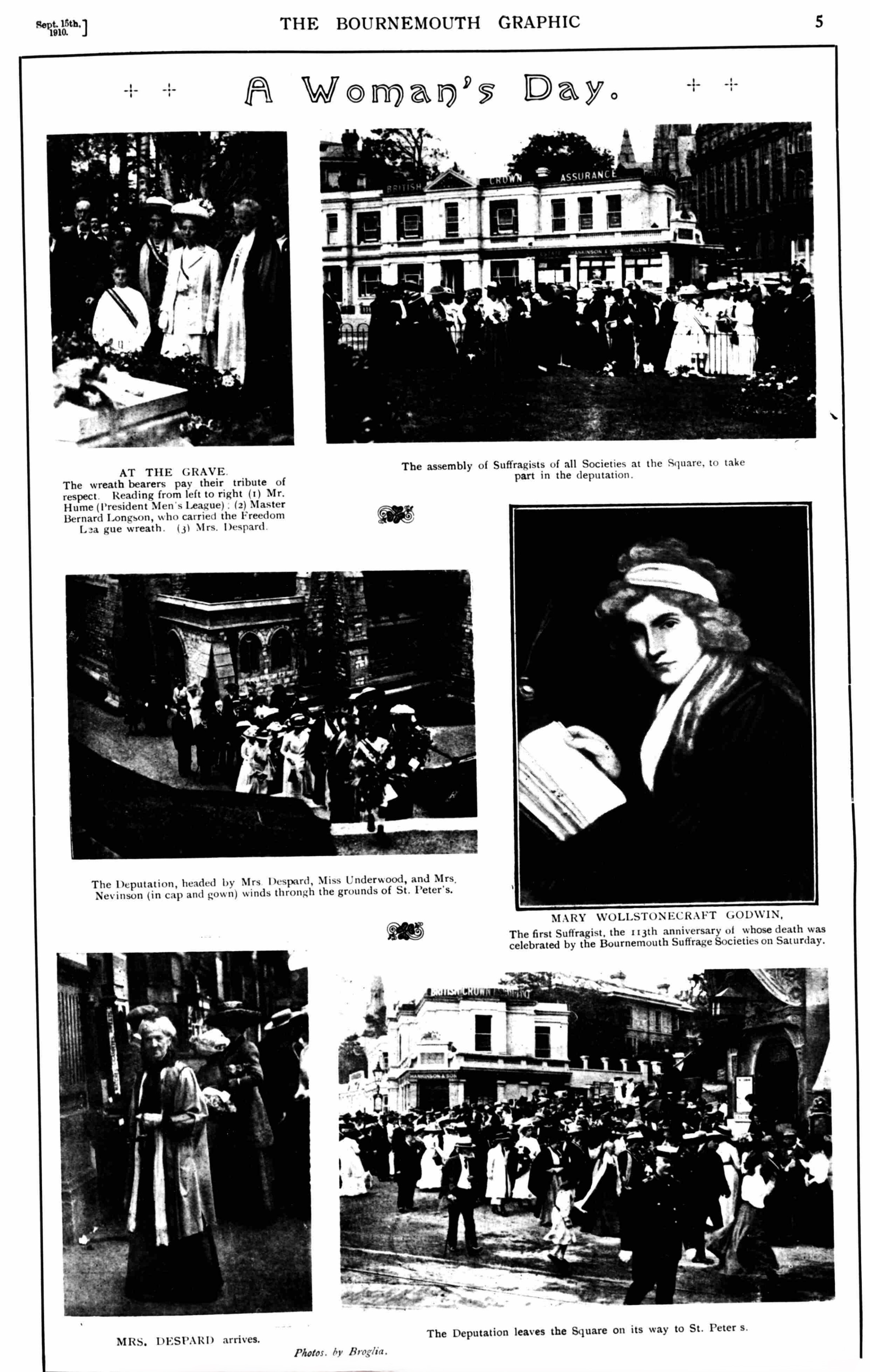
Suffrage societies honour Wollstonecraft on the 113th anniversary of her death

With the advent of the modern feminist movement, women as politically dissimilar from each other as Virginia Woolf and Emma Goldman embraced Wollstonecraft's life story. By 1929 Woolf described Wollstonecraft—her writing, arguments, and "experiments in living"—as immortal: "she is alive and active, she argues and experiments, we hear her voice and trace her influence even now among the living". Others, however, continued to decry Wollstonecraft's lifestyle. A biography published in 1932 refers to recent reprints of her works, incorporating new research, and to a "study" in 1911, a play in 1922, and another biography in 1924. Interest in her never completely died, with full-length biographies in 1937 and 1951.

With the emergence of feminist criticism in academia in the 1960s and 1970s, Wollstonecraft's works returned to prominence. Their fortunes reflected that of the second wave of the North American feminist movement itself; for example, in the early 1970s, six major biographies of Wollstonecraft were published that presented her "passionate life in apposition to [her] radical and rationalist agenda".

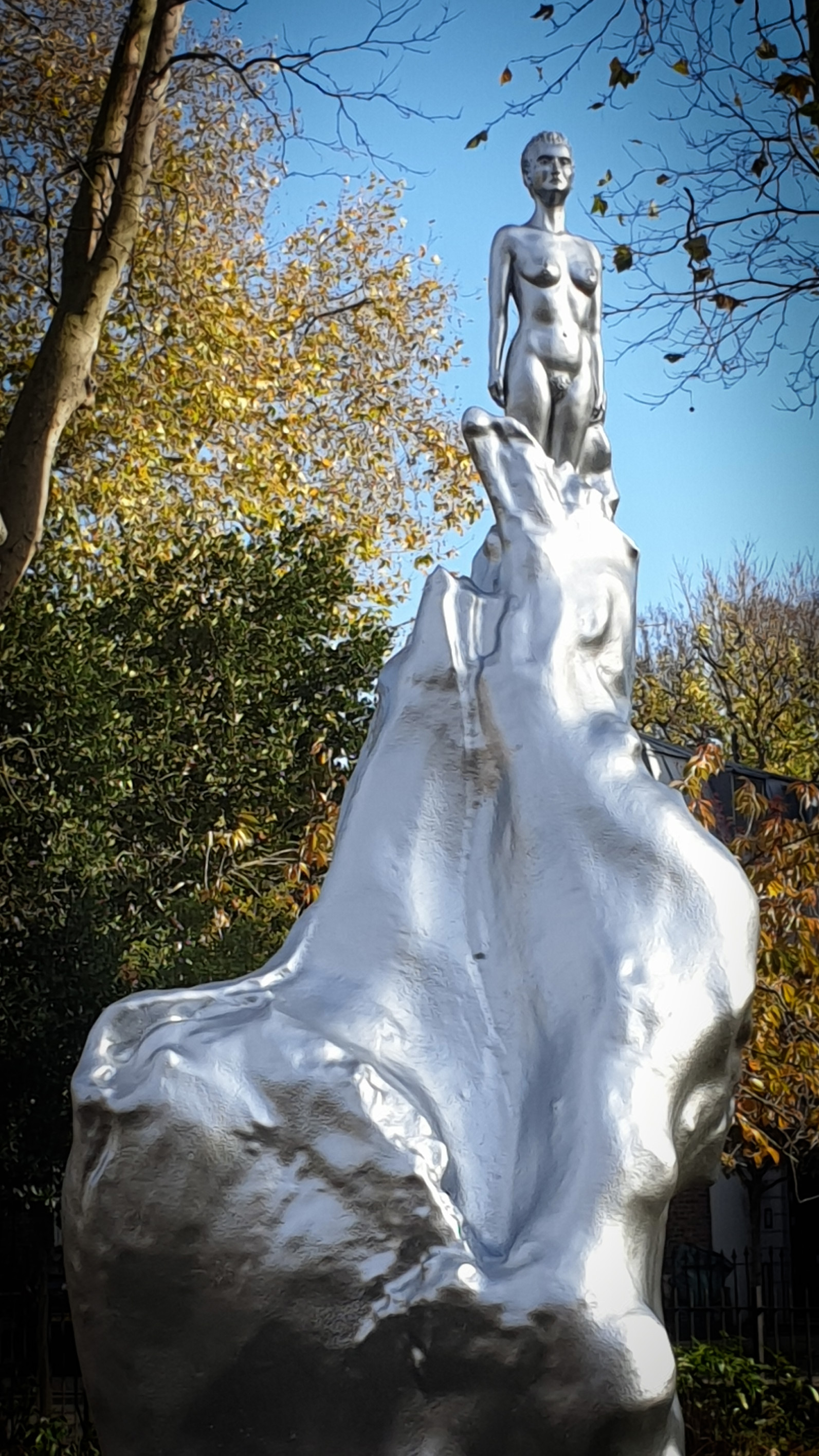
A Sculpture for Mary Wollstonecraft in Newington Green, London

Wollstonecraft's work has also had an effect on feminism outside academia. The feminist artwork The Dinner Party, first exhibited in 1979, features a place setting for Wollstonecraft. Ayaan Hirsi Ali, a political writer and former Muslim who is critical of Islam in general and its dictates regarding women in particular, cited the Rights of Woman in her autobiography Infidel and wrote that she was "inspired by Mary Wollstonecraft, the pioneering feminist thinker who told women they had the same ability to reason as men did and deserved the same rights". British writer Caitlin Moran, author of the best-selling How to Be a Woman, described herself as "half Wollstonecraft" to the New Yorker. She has also inspired more widely. Nobel Laureate Amartya Sen, the Indian economist and philosopher who first identified the missing women of Asia, draws repeatedly on Wollstonecraft as a political philosopher in The Idea of Justice.

In 2009, Wollstonecraft was selected by the Royal Mail for their "Eminent Britons" commemorative postage stamp issue. Several plaques have been erected to honour Wollstonecraft. A commemorative sculpture, A Sculpture for Mary Wollstonecraft by Maggi Hambling, was unveiled at Newington Green, London on 10 November 2020; it was criticised for its symbolic depiction rather than a lifelike representation of Wollstonecraft, which commentators felt represented stereotypical notions of beauty and the diminishing of women. In November 2020, it was announced that Trinity College Dublin, whose library had previously held forty busts, all of them of men, was commissioning four new busts of women, one of whom would be Wollstonecraft.

Mary Wollstonecraft has been brought up in fourth-wave feminist debates about hook-up culture, Wollstonecraft thought that men should be held to the same moral standards of chastity as women:

“The little respect paid to chastity in the male world is, I am persuaded, the grand source of many of the physical and moral evils that torment mankind, as well as of the vices and follies that degrade and destroy women; yet, at school, boys infallibly lose that decent bashfulness, which might have ripened into modesty at home.”

This idea has been popular particularly among reactionary feminists, such as Mary Harrington and Louise Perry, who question the consequences of the sexual revolution for women, Perry quotes Wollstonecraft in her book The Case Against the Sexual Revolution.

== Major works ==
=== Educational works ===
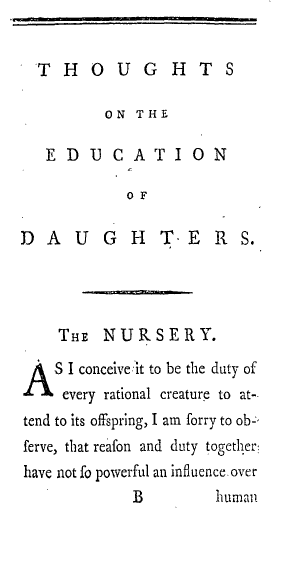
First page of the first edition of Thoughts on the Education of Daughters (1787)

The majority of Wollstonecraft's early productions are about education; she assembled an anthology of literary extracts "for the improvement of young women" entitled The Female Reader and she translated two children's works, Maria Geertruida van de Werken de Cambon's Young Grandison and Christian Gotthilf Salzmann's Elements of Morality. Her own writings also addressed the topic. In both her conduct book Thoughts on the Education of Daughters (1787) and her children's book Original Stories from Real Life (1788), Wollstonecraft advocates educating children into the emerging middle-class ethos: self-discipline, honesty, frugality, and social contentment. Both books also emphasize the importance of teaching children to reason, revealing Wollstonecraft's intellectual debt to the educational views of seventeenth-century philosopher John Locke. However, the prominence she affords religious faith and innate feeling distinguishes her work from his and links it to the discourse of sensibility popular at the end of the eighteenth century. Both texts also advocate the education of women, a controversial topic at the time and one which she would return to throughout her career, most notably in A Vindication of the Rights of Woman. Wollstonecraft argues that well-educated women will be good wives and mothers and ultimately contribute positively to the nation.

=== Vindications ===
==== Vindication of the Rights of Men (1790) ====
Published in response to Edmund Burke's Reflections on the Revolution in France (1790), which was a defence of constitutional monarchy, aristocracy, and the Church of England, and an attack on Wollstonecraft's friend, the Rev. Richard Price at the Newington Green Unitarian Church, Wollstonecraft's A Vindication of the Rights of Men (1790) attacks aristocracy and advocates republicanism. Hers was the first response in a pamphlet war that subsequently became known as the Revolution Controversy, in which Thomas Paine's Rights of Man (1792) became the rallying cry for reformers and radicals.

Wollstonecraft attacked not only monarchy and hereditary privilege but also the language that Burke used to defend and elevate it. In a famous passage in the Reflections, Burke had lamented: "I had thought ten thousand swords must have leaped from their scabbards to avenge even a look that threatened her [Marie Antoinette] with insult.—But the age of chivalry is gone." Most of Burke's detractors deplored what they viewed as theatrical pity for the French queen—a pity they felt was at the expense of the people. Wollstonecraft was unique in her attack on Burke's gendered language. By redefining the sublime and the beautiful, terms first established by Burke himself in A Philosophical Enquiry into the Origin of Our Ideas of the Sublime and Beautiful (1756), she undermined his rhetoric as well as his argument. Burke had associated the beautiful with weakness and femininity and the sublime with strength and masculinity; Wollstonecraft turns these definitions against him, arguing that his theatrical tableaux turn Burke's readers—the citizens—into weak women who are swayed by show. It was her first unabashedly feminist critique, which Wollstonecraft scholar Claudia L. Johnson argues remains unsurpassed in its argumentative force.

In her arguments for republican virtue, Wollstonecraft invokes an emerging middle-class ethos in opposition to what she views as the vice-ridden aristocratic code of manners. Influenced by Enlightenment thinkers, she believed in progress and derides Burke for relying on tradition and custom. She argues for rationality, pointing out that Burke's system would lead to the continuation of slavery, simply because it had been an ancestral tradition. She describes an idyllic country life in which each family can have a farm that will just suit its needs. Wollstonecraft contrasts her utopian picture of society, drawn with what she says is genuine feeling, to Burke's false feeling.

The Rights of Men was Wollstonecraft's first overtly political work, as well as her first feminist work; as Johnson contends, "it seems that in the act of writing the later portions of Rights of Men she discovered the subject that would preoccupy her for the rest of her career."

==== Vindication of the Rights of Woman (1792) ====
A Vindication of the Rights of Woman is one of the earliest works of feminist philosophy. In it, Wollstonecraft argues that women ought to have an education commensurate with their position in society and then proceeds to redefine that position, claiming that women are essential to the nation because they educate its children and because they could be "companions" to their husbands rather than mere wives. Instead of viewing women as ornaments to society or property to be traded in marriage, Wollstonecraft maintains that they are human beings deserving of the same fundamental rights as men. Large sections of the Rights of Woman respond vitriolically to conduct book writers such as James Fordyce and John Gregory and educational philosophers such as Jean-Jacques Rousseau, who wanted to deny women an education. (Rousseau famously argues in Émile (1762) that women should be educated for the pleasure of men.)

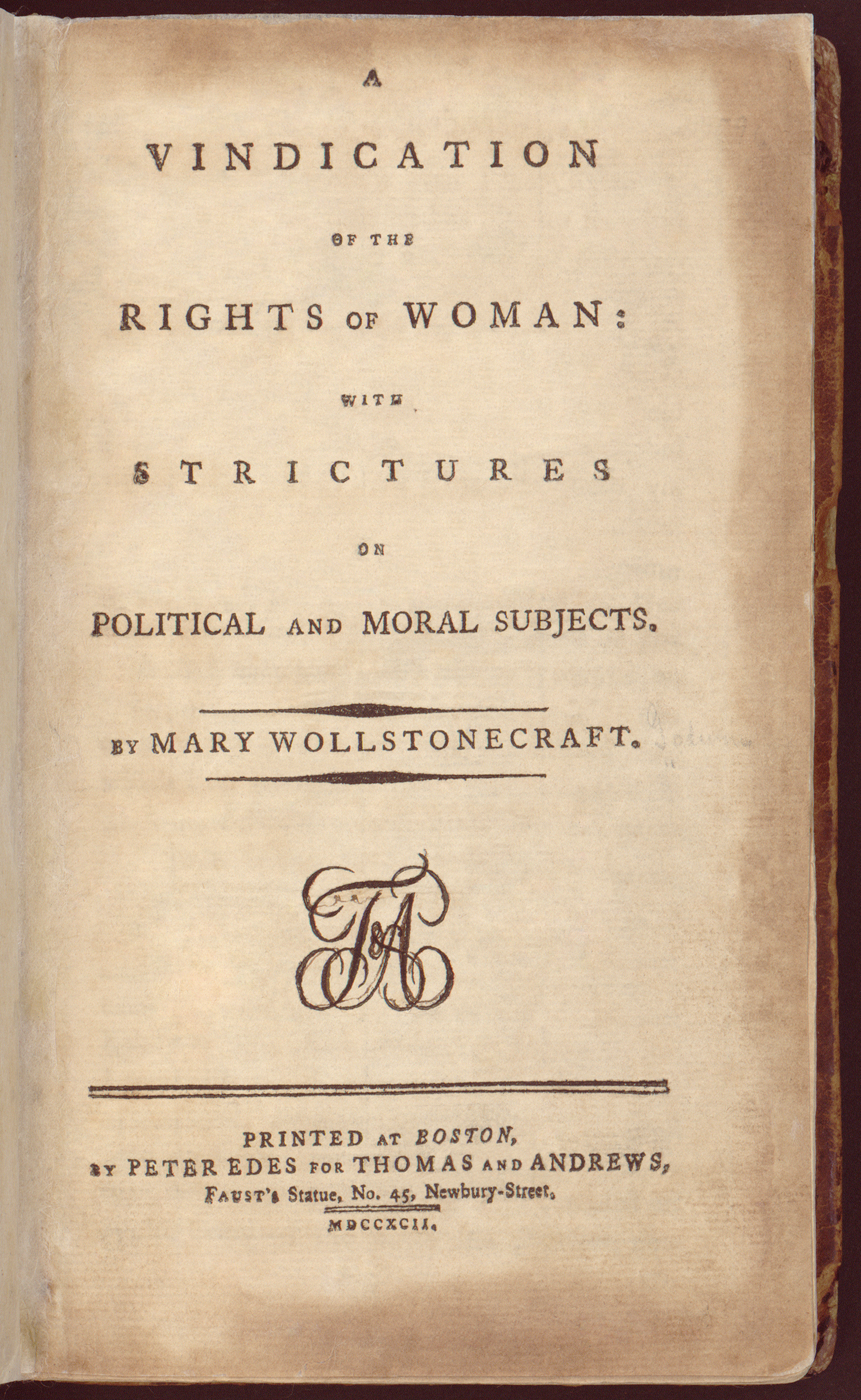
Title page from the first American edition of A Vindication of the Rights of Woman (1792)

Wollstonecraft states that currently many women are silly and superficial (she refers to them, for example, as "spaniels" and "toys"), but argues that this is not because of an innate deficiency of mind but rather because men have denied them access to education. Wollstonecraft is intent on illustrating the limitations that women's deficient educations have placed on them; she writes: "Taught from their infancy that beauty is woman's sceptre, the mind shapes itself to the body, and, roaming round its gilt cage, only seeks to adorn its prison." She implies that, without the encouragement young women receive from an early age to focus their attention on beauty and outward accomplishments, women could achieve much more.

While Wollstonecraft does call for equality between the sexes in particular areas of life, such as morality, she does not explicitly state that men and women are equal. What she does claim is that men and women are equal in the eyes of God. However, such claims of equality stand in contrast to her statements respecting the perceived superiority of masculine strength and valour. Wollstonecraft famously and ambiguously writes: "Let it not be concluded that I wish to invert the order of things; I have already granted, that, from the constitution of their bodies, men seem to be designed by Providence to attain a greater degree of virtue. I speak collectively of the whole sex; but I see not the shadow of a reason to conclude that their virtues should differ in respect to their nature. In fact, how can they, if virtue has only one eternal standard? I must therefore, if I reason consequently, as strenuously maintain that they have the same simple direction, as that there is a God." Her ambiguous statements regarding the equality of the sexes have since made it difficult to classify Wollstonecraft as a modern feminist, particularly since the word did not come into existence until the 1890s.

One of Wollstonecraft's most scathing critiques in the Rights of Woman is of false and excessive sensibility, particularly in women. She argues that women who succumb to sensibility are "blown about by every momentary gust of feeling" and because they are "the prey of their senses" they cannot think rationally. In fact, she claims, they do harm not only to themselves but to the entire civilization: these are not women who can help refine a civilization—a popular eighteenth-century idea—but women who will destroy it. Wollstonecraft does not argue that reason and feeling should act independently of each other; rather, she believes that they should inform each other.

In addition to her larger philosophical arguments, Wollstonecraft also lays out a specific educational plan. In the twelfth chapter of the Rights of Woman, "On National Education", she argues that all children should be sent to a "country day school" as well as given some education at home "to inspire a love of home and domestic pleasures." She also maintains that schooling should be co-educational, arguing that men and women, whose marriages are "the cement of society", should be "educated after the same model."

Wollstonecraft addresses her text to the middle-class, which she describes as the "most natural state", and in many ways the Rights of Woman is inflected by a bourgeois view of the world. It encourages modesty and industry in its readers and attacks the uselessness of the aristocracy. But Wollstonecraft is not necessarily a friend to the poor; for example, in her national plan for education, she suggests that, after the age of nine, the poor, except for those who are brilliant, should be separated from the rich and taught in another school.

=== Novels ===
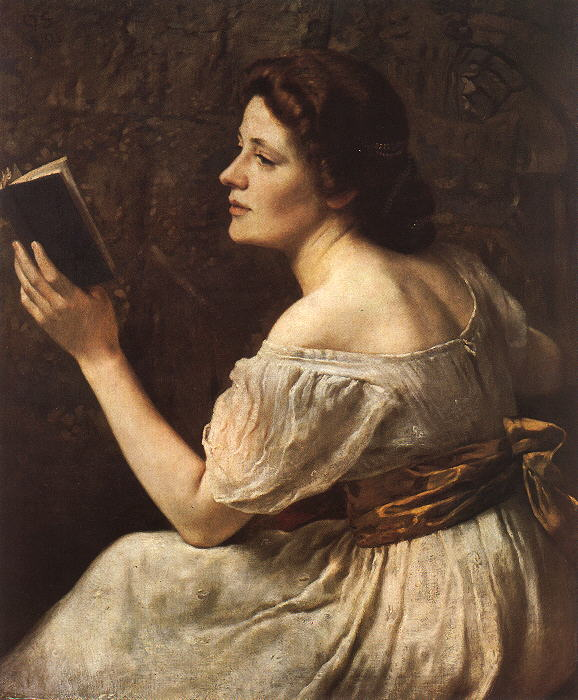
Otto Scholderer's Young Girl Reading (1883); in both Mary and The Wrongs of Woman, Wollstonecraft criticizes women who imagine themselves as sentimental heroines.

Both of Wollstonecraft's novels criticize what she viewed as the patriarchal institution of marriage and its deleterious effects on women. In her first novel, Mary: A Fiction (1788), the eponymous heroine is forced into a loveless marriage for economic reasons; she fulfils her desire for love and affection outside marriage with two passionate romantic friendships, one with a woman and one with a man. Maria: or, The Wrongs of Woman (1798), an unfinished novel published posthumously and often considered Wollstonecraft's most radical feminist work, revolves around the story of a woman imprisoned in an insane asylum by her husband; like Mary, Maria also finds fulfilment outside of marriage, in an affair with a fellow inmate and a friendship with one of her keepers. Neither of Wollstonecraft's novels depict successful marriages, although she posits such relationships in the Rights of Woman. At the end of Mary, the heroine believes she is going "to that world where there is neither marrying, nor giving in marriage", presumably a positive state of affairs.

Both of Wollstonecraft's novels also critique the discourse of sensibility, a moral philosophy and aesthetic that had become popular at the end of the eighteenth century. Mary is itself a novel of sensibility and Wollstonecraft attempts to use the tropes of that genre to undermine sentimentalism itself, a philosophy she believed was damaging to women because it encouraged them to rely overmuch on their emotions. In The Wrongs of Woman the heroine's indulgence on romantic fantasies fostered by novels themselves is depicted as particularly detrimental.

Female friendships are central to both of Wollstonecraft's novels, but it is the friendship between Maria and Jemima, the servant charged with watching over her in the insane asylum, that is the most historically significant. This friendship, based on a sympathetic bond of motherhood, between an upper-class woman and a lower-class woman is one of the first moments in the history of feminist literature that hints at a cross-class argument, that is, that women of different economic positions have the same interests because they are women.

=== Letters Written in Sweden, Norway, and Denmark (1796) ===
Wollstonecraft's Letters Written in Sweden, Norway, and Denmark is a deeply personal travel narrative. The 25 letters cover a wide range of topics, from sociological reflections on Scandinavia and its peoples to philosophical questions regarding identity to musings on her relationship with Imlay (although he is not referred to by name in the text). Using the rhetoric of the sublime, Wollstonecraft explores the relationship between the self and society. Reflecting the strong influence of Rousseau, Letters Written in Sweden, Norway, and Denmark shares the themes of the French philosopher's Reveries of a Solitary Walker (1782): "the search for the source of human happiness, the stoic rejection of material goods, the ecstatic embrace of nature, and the essential role of sentiment in understanding". While Rousseau ultimately rejects society, however, Wollstonecraft celebrates domestic scenes and industrial progress in her text.

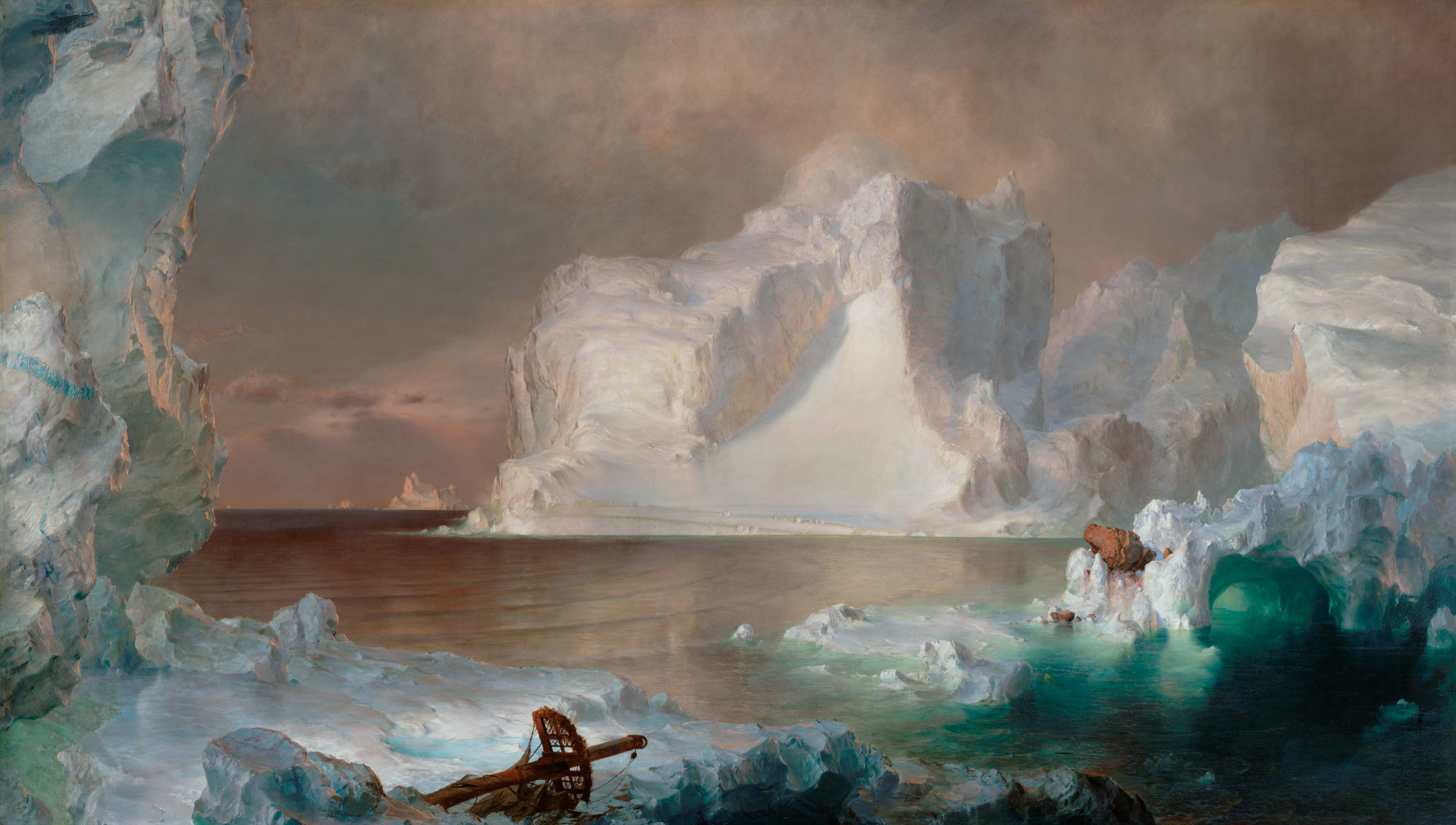
The Icebergs (1861) by Frederic Edwin Church demonstrates the aesthetic of the sublime.

Wollstonecraft promotes subjective experience, particularly in relation to nature, exploring the connections between the sublime and sensibility. Many of the letters describe the breathtaking scenery of Scandinavia and Wollstonecraft's desire to create an emotional connection to that natural world. In so doing, she gives greater value to the imagination than she had in previous works. As in her previous writings, she champions the liberation and education of women. In a change from her earlier works, however, she illustrates the detrimental effects of commerce on society, contrasting the imaginative connection to the world with a commercial and mercenary one, an attitude she associates with Imlay.

Letters Written in Sweden, Norway, and Denmark was Wollstonecraft's most popular book in the 1790s. It sold well and was reviewed positively by most critics. Godwin wrote "if ever there was a book calculated to make a man in love with its author, this appears to me to be the book." It influenced Romantic poets such as William Wordsworth and Samuel Taylor Coleridge, who drew on its themes and its aesthetic.

== List of works ==
This is a complete list of Mary Wollstonecraft's works; all works are the first edition unless otherwise noted.

=== Authored by Wollstonecraft ===
- Thoughts on the Education of Daughters: With Reflections on Female Conduct, in the More Important Duties of Life. London: Joseph Johnson, 1787.
- Mary: A Fiction. London: Joseph Johnson, 1788.
- Original Stories from Real Life: With Conversations Calculated to Regulate the Affections and Form the Mind to Truth and Goodness. London: Joseph Johnson, 1788.
- The Female Reader: Or, Miscellaneous Pieces, in Prose and Verse; selected from the best writers, and disposed under proper heads; for the improvement of young women. By Mr. Cresswick, teacher of elocution [Mary Wollstonecraft]. To which is prefixed a preface, containing some hints on female education. London: Joseph Johnson, 1789.
- A Vindication of the Rights of Men, in a Letter to the Right Honourable Edmund Burke. London: Joseph Johnson, 1790.
- A Vindication of the Rights of Woman with Strictures on Moral and Political Subjects. London: Joseph Johnson, 1792.
- "On the Prevailing Opinion of a Sexual Character in Women, with Strictures on Dr. Gregory's Legacy to His Daughters". New Annual Register (1792): 457–466. [From Rights of Woman]
- An Historical and Moral View of the French Revolution; and the Effect It Has produced in Europe. Volume the first. London: Joseph Johnson, 1794.
- Letters Written during a Short Residence in Sweden, Norway, and Denmark. London: Joseph Johnson, 1796.
- "On Poetry, and Our Relish for the Beauties of Nature". Monthly Magazine (April 1797).
- The Wrongs of Woman, or Maria. Posthumous Works of the Author of A Vindication of the Rights of Woman. Ed. William Godwin. London: Joseph Johnson, 1798. [Published posthumously; unfinished]
- "The Cave of Fancy". Posthumous Works of the Author of A Vindication of the Rights of Woman. Ed. William Godwin. London: Joseph Johnson, 1798. [Published posthumously; fragment written in 1787]
- "Letter on the Present Character of the French Nation". Posthumous Works of the Author of A Vindication of the Rights of Woman. Ed. William Godwin. London: Joseph Johnson, 1798. [Published posthumously; written in 1793]
- "Fragment of Letters on the Management of Infants". Posthumous Works of the Author of A Vindication of the Rights of Woman. Ed. William Godwin. London: Joseph Johnson, 1798. [Published posthumously; unfinished]
- "Lessons". Posthumous Works of the Author of A Vindication of the Rights of Woman. Ed. William Godwin. London: Joseph Johnson, 1798. [Published posthumously; unfinished]
- "Hints". Posthumous Works of the Author of A Vindication of the Rights of Woman. Ed. William Godwin. London: Joseph Johnson, 1798. [Published posthumously; notes on the second volume of Rights of Woman, never written]
- Contributions to the Analytical Review (1788–1797) [published anonymously]

=== Translated by Wollstonecraft ===
- Necker, Jacques. Of the Importance of Religious Opinions. Trans. Mary Wollstonecraft. London: Joseph Johnson, 1788.
- de Cambon, Maria Geertruida van de Werken. Young Grandison. A Series of Letters from Young Persons to Their Friends. Vol. I; Vol. II. Trans. Mary Wollstonecraft. London: Joseph Johnson, 1790.
- Salzmann, Christian Gotthilf. Elements of Morality, for the Use of Children; With an introductory address to parents. Vol. I. Vol. II. Trans. Mary Wollstonecraft. Londen: Joseph Johnson, 1790-1793.

== See also ==
- 90481 Wollstonecraft, an asteroid
- Charles Wollstonecraft, younger brother

== Bibliography ==
=== Primary works ===
- Butler, Marilyn, ed. Burke, Paine, Godwin, and the Revolution Controversy. Cambridge University Press, 2002. ISBN 978-0-521-28656-5.
- Wollstonecraft, Mary. The Collected Letters of Mary Wollstonecraft. Ed. Janet Todd. New York: Columbia University Press, 2003. ISBN 978-0-231-13142-1.
- Wollstonecraft, Mary. The Complete Works of Mary Wollstonecraft. Ed. Janet Todd and Marilyn Butler. 7 vols. London: William Pickering, 1989. ISBN 978-0-8147-9225-4.
- Wollstonecraft, Mary. The Vindications: The Rights of Men and The Rights of Woman. Eds. D. L. Macdonald and Kathleen Scherf. Toronto: Broadview, 1997. ISBN 978-1-55111-088-2.
- Wollstonecraft, Mary (2005). "On the pernicious effects which arise from the unnatural distinctions established in society". In Cudd, Ann E.; Andreasen, Robin O. (eds.). Feminist theory: a philosophical anthology. Oxford: Blackwell. pp. 11–16. ISBN 978-1-4051-1661-9.

=== Biographies ===
- Franklin, Caroline. Mary Wollstonecraft: A Literary Life. Springer, 2004. ISBN 978-0-230-51005-0
- Flexner, Eleanor. Mary Wollstonecraft: A Biography. New York: Coward, McCann & Geoghegan, 1972. ISBN 978-0-698-10447-1.
- Godwin, William. Memoirs of the Author of a Vindication of the Rights of Woman. 1798. Eds. Pamela Clemit and Gina Luria Walker. Peterborough: Broadview, 2001. ISBN 978-1-55111-259-6.
- Gordon, Charlotte. Romantic Outlaws: The Extraordinary Lives of Mary Wollstonecraft and Mary Shelley. Random House, 2015. ISBN 978-0-8129-9651-7.
- Gordon, Lyndall. Vindication: A Life of Mary Wollstonecraft. Virago, 2005. ISBN 978-1-84408-141-7.
- Hays, Mary. "Memoirs of Mary Wollstonecraft". Annual Necrology (1797–98): 411–460.
- Jacobs, Diane. Her Own Woman: The Life of Mary Wollstonecraft. Simon & Schuster, 2001. ISBN 978-0-349-11461-3.
- Paul, Charles Kegan. Letters to Imlay, with prefatory memoir by C. Kegan Paul. London: C. Kegan Paul, 1879.
- Marshall, Julian, Mrs. The Life and Letters of Mary Wollstonecraft Shelley (2 volumes; London: R. Bentley & Son, 1889), contrib. by Mary Wollstonecraft Shelley.
- Pennell, Elizabeth Robins. Life of Mary Wollstonecraft (Boston: Roberts Brothers, 1884).
- St Clair, William. The Godwins and the Shelleys: The biography of a family. New York: W. W. Norton, 1989. ISBN 978-0-8018-4233-7.
- Sunstein, Emily. A Different Face: The Life of Mary Wollstonecraft. Boston: Little, Brown and Co., 1975. ISBN 978-0-06-014201-8.
- Todd, Janet. Mary Wollstonecraft: A Revolutionary Life. London: Weidenfeld & Nicolson, 2000. ISBN 978-0-231-12184-2.
- Tomalin, Claire. The Life and Death of Mary Wollstonecraft. Rev. ed. 1974. New York: Penguin, 1992. ISBN 978-0-14-016761-0.
- Wardle, Ralph M. Mary Wollstonecraft: A Critical Biography. Lincoln: University of Nebraska Press, 1951.

=== Other secondary works ===
- Callender, Michelle. "The grand theatre of political changes": Marie Antoinette, the republic, and the politics of spectacle in Mary Wollstonecraft's An historical and moral view of the French Revolution", pp. 375–392 from European Romantic Review, Volume 11, Issue 4, Fall 2000.
- Conger, Syndy McMillen. Mary Wollstonecraft and the Language of Sensibility. Rutherford: Fairleigh Dickinson University Press, 1994. ISBN 978-0-8386-3553-7.
- Detre, Jean. A most extraordinary pair: Mary Wollstonecraft and William Godwin, Garden City: Doubleday, 1975
- Falco, Maria J., ed. Feminist Interpretations of Mary Wollstonecraft. University Park: Penn State Press, 1996. ISBN 978-0-271-01493-7.
- Favret, Mary. Romantic Correspondence: Women, politics and the fiction of letters. Cambridge University Press, 1993. ISBN 978-0-521-41096-0.
- Furniss, Tom. "Mary Wollstonecraft's French Revolution". The Cambridge Companion to Mary Wollstonecraft. Ed. Claudia L. Johnson. Cambridge University Press, 2002. pp. 59–81. ISBN 978-0-521-78952-3
- Halldenius, Lena. Mary Wollstonecraft and Feminist Republicanism: Independence, Rights and the Experience of Unfreedom, London: Pickering & Chatto, 2015. ISBN 978-1-84893-536-5.
- Holmes, Richard. "1968: Revolutions", in Footsteps: Adventures of a Romantic Biographer. Hodder & Stoughton, 1985. ISBN 978-0-00-720453-3.
- Janes, R.M. "On the Reception of Mary Wollstonecraft's A Vindication of the Rights of Woman". Journal of the History of Ideas 39 (1978): 293–302.
- Johnson, Claudia L. Equivocal Beings: Politics, Gender, and Sentimentality in the 1790s. University of Chicago Press, 1995. ISBN 978-0-226-40184-3.
- Jones, Chris. "Mary Wollstonecraft's Vindications and Their Political Tradition". The Cambridge Companion to Mary Wollstonecraft. Ed. Claudia L. Johnson. Cambridge University Press, 2002. ISBN 978-0-521-78952-3.
- Jones, Vivien. "Mary Wollstonecraft and the literature of advice and instruction". The Cambridge Companion to Mary Wollstonecraft. Ed. Claudia Johnson. Cambridge University Press, 2002. ISBN 978-0-521-78952-3.
- Kaplan, Cora. "Mary Wollstonecraft's reception and legacies". The Cambridge Companion to Mary Wollstonecraft Ed. Claudia L. Johnson. Cambridge University Press, 2002. ISBN 978-0-521-78952-3.
- —. "Pandora's Box: Subjectivity, Class and Sexuality in Socialist Feminist Criticism". Sea Changes: Essays on Culture and Feminism. London: Verso, 1986. ISBN 978-0-86091-151-7.
- —. "Wild Nights: Pleasure/Sexuality/Feminism". Sea Changes: Essays on Culture and Feminism. London: Verso, 1986. ISBN 978-0-86091-151-7.
- Kelly, Gary. Revolutionary Feminism: The Mind and Career of Mary Wollstonecraft. New York: St. Martin's, 1992. ISBN 978-0-312-12904-0.
- McElroy, Wendy (2008). "Wollstonecraft, Mary (1759–1797)". In Hamowy, Ronald (ed.). The Encyclopedia of Libertarianism. Thousand Oaks, CA: SAGE Publications, Cato Institute. pp. 545–546. doi:10.4135/9781412965811.n331. ISBN 978-1-4129-6580-4.
- Mellor, Anne K. "Mary Wollstonecraft's A Vindication of the Rights of Woman and the Women Writers of Her Day." In The Cambridge Companion to Mary Wollstonecraft, edited by Claudia L. Johnson, 141–159. Cambridge University Press, 2002. doi:10.1017/CCOL0521783437.009.
- Myers, Mitzi. "Impeccable Governess, Rational Dames, and Moral Mothers: Mary Wollstonecraft and the Female Tradition in Georgian Children's Books". Children's Literature 14 (1986):31–59.
- —. "Sensibility and the 'Walk of Reason': Mary Wollstonecraft's Literary Reviews as Cultural Critique". Sensibility in Transformation: Creative Resistance to Sentiment from the Augustans to the Romantics. Ed. Syndy McMillen Conger. Rutherford: Fairleigh Dickinson University Press, 1990. ISBN 978-0-8386-3352-6.
- —. "Wollstonecraft's Letters Written ... in Sweden: Towards Romantic Autobiography". Studies in Eighteenth-Century Culture 8 (1979): 165–185.
- Orr, Clarissa Campbell, ed. Wollstonecraft's daughters: womanhood in England and France, 1780–1920. Manchester University Press, 1996.
- Poovey, Mary. The Proper Lady and the Woman Writer: Ideology as Style in the Works of Mary Wollstonecraft, Mary Shelley and Jane Austen. University of Chicago Press, 1984. ISBN 978-0-226-67528-2.
- Richardson, Alan. "Mary Wollstonecraft on education". The Cambridge Companion to Mary Wollstonecraft. Ed. Claudia Johnson. Cambridge University Press, 2002. ISBN 978-0-521-78952-3.
- Rossi, Alice. The Feminist papers: from Adams to de Beauvoir. Northeastern, 1988.
- Sapiro, Virginia. A Vindication of Political Virtue: The Political Theory of Mary Wollstonecraft. University of Chicago Press, 1992. ISBN 978-0-226-73491-0.
- Taylor, Barbara. Mary Wollstonecraft and the Feminist Imagination. Cambridge University Press, 2003. ISBN 978-0-521-66144-7.
- Todd, Janet. Women's Friendship in Literature. New York: Columbia University Press, 1980. ISBN 978-0-231-04562-9
- Wolfson, Susan J. On Mary Wollstonecraft's A Vindication of the Rights of Woman: The First of a New Genus. Columbia University Press, 2023.
