= Wolstencroft =

Wolstencroft may refer to:

== People ==
- David Wolstencroft, Scottish television writer and author
- Ramon D. Wolstencroft (1936-2017), Astronomer AAS obituary
- Richard Wolstencroft, Australian filmmaker
- Simon Wolstencroft, English drummer, songwriter, and band member
- Mary Wollstonecraft, philosopher, author of A Vindication of the Rights of Woman, mother of Mary Shelley
- Mary Wollstonecraft Godwin Shelley, Writer of Frankenstein.

== See also ==
- Woolstencroft
- Wollstonecraft (disambiguation)
