= Woolstencroft =

Woolstencroft is a surname. Notable people with the surname include:

- Lauren Woolstencroft, Canadian alpine skier and Paralympic Games gold medalist
- Lynne Woolstencroft, Canadian politician and former mayor of Waterloo, Ontario

== See also ==
- Wolstencroft
- Wollstonecraft (disambiguation)
