= Cynthia Bailey Lee =

Computer science lecturer at Stanford University

Cynthia Bailey
- Education: University of California San Diego
- Known for: Advocating for tech to be more inclusive Flipped classroom pedagogy
- Awards: Lloyd W. Dinkelspiel Award; SIGCSE Top 10 Papers of All Time Award; SIGCSE Best Paper Award; Stanford Society of Women Engineers Professor of the Year Award
- Scientific career
- Fields: Computer Science
- Workplaces: Stanford University; NASA Ames; Mohomine
- Doctoral advisor: Allan Snavely

Cynthia Bailey is a lecturer in Computer Science at Stanford University from Palo Alto, California. Her research interests are in computer science pedagogy and the flipped classroom approach. She has advocated for the greater inclusion of women and minorities in computer science, and is known for her "ladysplaining" article addressing the author of the controversial Google memo.

== Education and work experience ==
Lee received her BS in 2001 and MS in 2004 in Computer Science from University of California, San Diego (UC San Diego). Lee studied big data applications of parallel computing and high-performance distributed computing for her graduate studies also at UC San Diego, where she graduated with her PhD in 2009. Her doctoral thesis evaluated scheduling algorithms for supercomputer systems. She spent her summers from 1996 to 1998 as an intern for NASA Ames, and worked with a search and document engine and management startup called Mohomine from 1999 to 2002. In March 2012, Lee and Beth Simon started an instructional website called Peer Instruction for Computer Science, which provides support for Computer Science instructors who want to use Flipped classroom ideas.

At Stanford University, Lee has taught numerous computer science courses, including Computer Organization and Systems, Programming Abstractions, Mathematical Foundations of Computing, and Race and Gender in Silicon Valley (a course she initiated in 2018).

== Activism for women in tech ==
Lee is outspoken about issues that face women and minorities in technology. She wrote guidelines for other instructors in her department to help them foster a more inclusive community, including using gender-neutral language and examples. She encouraged instructors to give additional encouragement and attention to women and minorities. She is also for promoting conversations about faith, ethics, and tech culture.

Lee spoke at a Stanford convocation for Latter-day Saint students, exhorting them to remember the needs of people outside of their work meetings, and used Esther as an example of someone who stood up for people who had less power than she did. She also hosted a coding workshop for young women and girls.

== Awards ==
- Lloyd W. Dinkelspiel Award (2019), Stanford University
- Best Paper Award (2016), ACM SIGCSE
- Professor of the Year (2015), Stanford Society of Women Engineers
