= Resistance to diversity efforts in organizations =

Efforts by an organization to ensure and support a diverse membership (whether along ethnic, racial, gender, or other lines) often face resistance from within the organization. Resistance (sometimes referred to as backlash) refers to thoughts, feelings, or behaviors from individuals within the organization that ultimately undermine the success of diversity-related organizational change. Diversity-related change efforts include practices such as affirmative action, diversity training, and targeted hiring and recruitment. These practices are implemented across many types of organizations including corporate and nonprofit organizations, as well as governments and educational institutions. The use of such practices may be referred to as diversity management, and resistance to these practices in organizations is well-established in the United States and globally.

In the U.S., resistance to workforce diversification in organizations was noted around the civil rights movement–for example, among White individuals in many business organizations, who faced workplace concerns over supposed displacement by minorities in the 1960s–but broad resistance to diversity efforts largely began after the civil rights movement. Resistance has been documented in business and nonprofit organizations, academic institutions, and governments.

== Definition and conceptualizations ==
Resistance can entail active opposition, covert or passive opposition, a lack of support, or a mix of supportive and unsupportive attitudes or behaviors. Resistance is commonly conceptualized as a spectrum with opposition to diversity efforts on one end and support on the other. For example, two large-scale surveys of countries in the European Union measured respondents' attitudes toward diversity efforts on a scale from "(0) Completely oppose" to "(4) Completely support." The General Social Survey measures attitudes toward race- and gender-based affirmative action using "1 (strongly favors) to 4 (strongly opposes)" items. Other conceptualizations of resistance are unidimensional, meaning they construe resistance as a lack of support. For example, people who disagree with statements like "I support the D&I policy of this organization" have categorized as opponents to diversity efforts.

Resistance to diversity efforts in organizations is likely multidimensional, meaning that employees can exhibit thoughts, attitudes, or behaviors that are ambiguous, or both support and resist organizational diversity efforts. Multidimensional conceptualizations often identify profiles of responses to diversity efforts, characterized by unique attitudes and behaviors. Along these lines, researchers identified "torn shapers" as individuals who see personal benefits from diversity efforts, but exhibit a mix of attitudes and behaviors supporting and resisting these efforts. This approach may explain evidence that individuals and organizations outwardly support diversity efforts but resist taking supportive actions.

== What is being resisted ==
Diversity efforts in organizations are often targeted toward a specific underrepresented or underserved group, such as racial or ethnic minorities, or women.

=== Resistance to racial or ethnic diversity efforts ===
Organizations' efforts to increase the representation and workplace experience of minority groups face can backlash from prejudiced employees within the organization. For example, Intel's CEO reported being threatened in response to his diversity efforts, specifically identifying a feeling of threat among White, male employees at the company. Along these lines, some researchers have linked resistance to these diversity efforts to "White male backlash."

In 2016, Facebook's CEO faced challenges with what he considered the malicious behavior of his employees replacing a "black lives matter" message with an "all lives matter" message. Some employees may be resisting the diversity messages of multiculturalism-based ideologies that embrace ethnic differences between groups or colorblind-based ideologies that ignore the ethnic differences between groups—common ideological options for managing diversity in the workforce.

In 2018, employees of Sasol protested against a plan to allocate company shares to Black employees, arguing that the plan was exclusionary on the basis of race. Scholars have identified that zero-sum perceptions may influence resistance to these diversity efforts, such that a policy benefiting a racial minority group creates a disadvantage for others.

=== Resistance to gender diversity efforts ===
Gender diversity efforts in organizations address gender inequality in the workplace. Resistance to gender diversity efforts has been documented in the technology field. For example, In 2017, attention was given to the technology industry in light of James Damore's document "Google's Ideological Echo Chamber", which went viral as a prominent example of perceived "anti-diversity" attitudes. The document says Google's diversity initiatives discriminate against overrepresented group members (i.e. males) and foster tension within the organization. Related research has observed a similar pattern of resistance in the fields of science, technology, engineering, and mathematics (STEM); information that diversity initiatives would increase female representation led to resistance among men who believed there is legitimacy to men best-representing STEM (i.e. prototypicality legitimacy) and those who also had concerns about losing the ability to best represent STEM (prototypicality threat).

In 2024, resistance to gender diversity efforts was documented among employees at Rio Tinto. Employees argued that the organization's gender diversity efforts undermined a culture of meritocracy at the company.

== Possible explanations ==
=== General processes of resisting diversity ===
Some scholars propose that resistance to diversity can generally be understood to be a result of evolved cognitive processes that impact relations between different groups in society. They point to a disconnect between the once-adaptive way humans evolved sensitivity to group differences (e.g. "us" versus "them" tribal boundaries) and some current social environments that contain unprecedented levels of diversity. They propose resistance to diversity may stem from the conflict between automatic social categorization and modern heterogeneous social environments.

=== Identity threats ===
As companies attempt to grow diverse workforces and train them to work harmoniously, research suggests minority group progress may induce a threat response from those in the majority group. Researchers Major and Kaiser argue these types of diversity initiatives jeopardize status hierarchies and that this status instability produces threat, even within well-meaning, "prodiversity" progressives.

Racial progress has been shown to negatively impact Whites' self-worth; Whites may buffer this impact by perceiving anti-white bias (i.e. racial discounting). Similarly, researchers have observed increases in social identity threat among men who discuss the instability of men's high status (i.e. changing gender-status relations) with women's.

Another possible threat-related mechanism that could underlie resistance to diversity is prototypicality threat, or the threat that one's sub-group will no longer best represent the broader, superordinate group.

=== Feelings of exclusion ===
Although multicultural ideology is commonly used in workplaces, research suggests White individuals may associate multiculturalism with exclusion and may not readily associate multiculturalism with conceptions of the self. This program of research also found the degree to which Whites feel included, relative to minorities, can help explain racial differences in diversity endorsement. Plaut et al suggest socially contextualized cues to inclusion or exclusion can meaningfully impact resistance to diversity.

In response to the association between multiculturalism and feelings of exclusion among members of dominant groups, scholars have called for the use of all-inclusive multiculturalism, or multiculturalism that explicitly includes the dominant group. These researchers noted that whether non-minorities are included or excluded in an article about multiculturalism can implicitly influence their inclusionary associations with the ideology.

=== Problems with diversity efforts ===
Commentators and scholars have speculated that diversity training may itself be creating backlash because employees may feel uncomfortable in training environments or resent being told what to do. When examining the sources of resistance to diversity efforts, researchers have said organizations often use negative, legal-focused deterrents within bias training, designate diversity training as mandatory, and associated the training with corrective action for "problem groups".

Consistent with this thinking, researchers documented evidence of a "counter-response" (i.e. rebellion/defiance) when administering brochures or priming participants with controlling conceptualizations of prejudice-reduction, compared with autonomy-supporting conceptualizations. The controlling conceptualizations focused on the need to reduce prejudice and comply with norms of non-prejudice, whereas the autonomy-supporting conceptualizations focused on drawing attention to the choice and personal value involved in non-prejudice. Finding negative outcomes associated with the controlling conditions, they said common organizational efforts to reduce prejudice via control may be unintentionally increasing resistance.

== See also ==
- Diversity, equity, and inclusion
