= Wollstonecraft (disambiguation) =

Mary Wollstonecraft (1759–1797) was a British writer, philosopher, and advocate of women's rights.

Wollstonecraft may also refer to:

- Wollstonecraft, New South Wales, suburb of North Sydney Council, New South Wales Australia, named after Edward
  - Wollstonecraft railway station, railway station in the suburb

== People with the surname ==
- Charles Wollstonecraft (1770–1817), U.S. Army officer, brother of Mary Wollstonecraft
- Mary Wollstonecraft Shelley (1797–1851), author of Frankenstein, daughter of Mary Wollstonecraft
- Edward Wollstonecraft (1783–1832), merchant and explorer, nephew of Mary Wollstonecraft
- Fanny Imlay, also known as Frances Wollstonecraft, daughter of Mary Wollstonecraft
- Anne Kingsbury Wollstonecraft (1791-1828), botanist, naturalist, botanical illustrator, sister-in-law of Mary Wollstonecraft
