= Mary Harrington =

British writer and editor

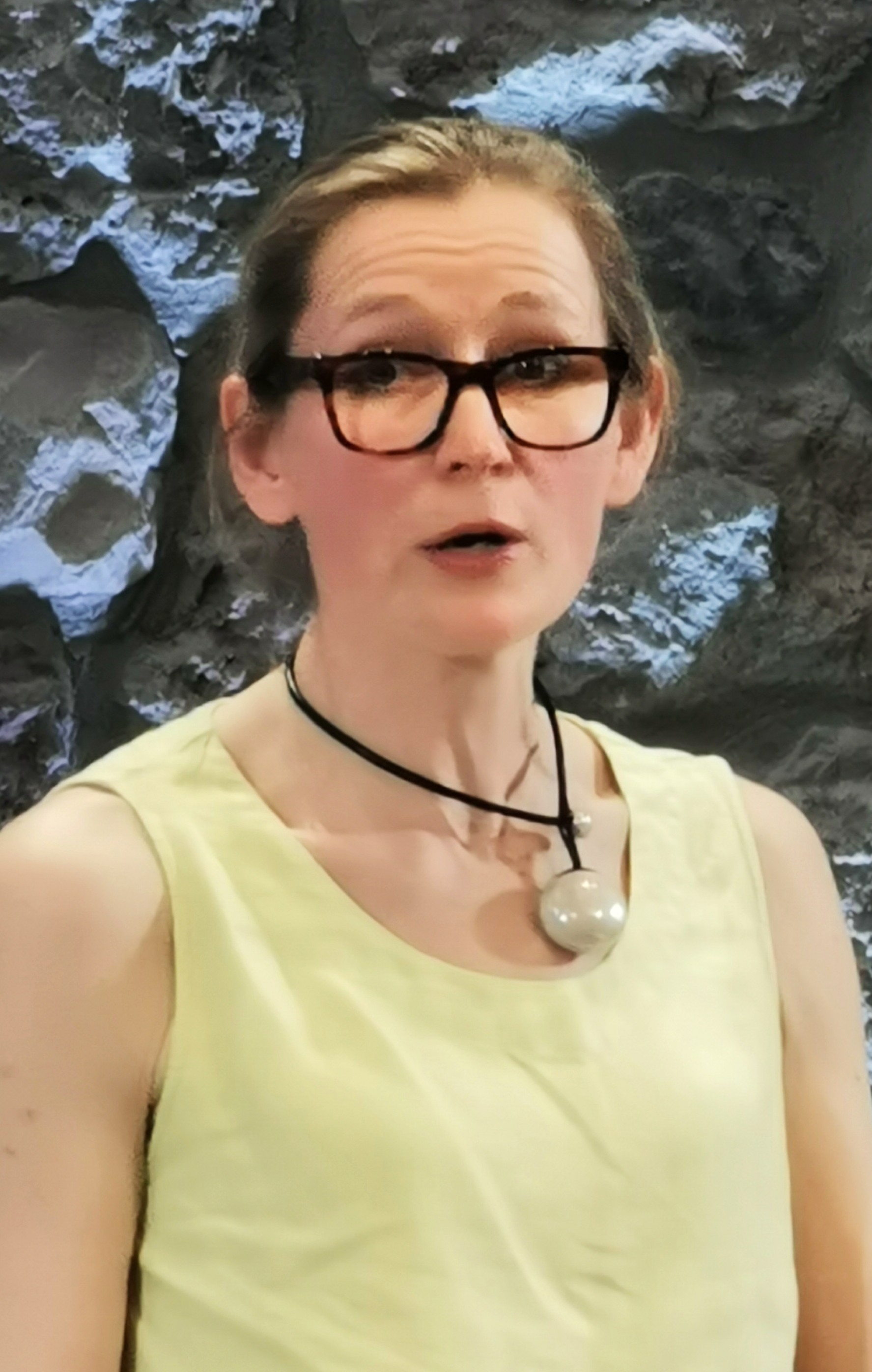
In 2025

Mary Harrington is a British journalist. She coined the term reactionary feminism and advocated it in her 2023 book Feminism Against Progress.

As a child, Harrington attended a Waldorf school. After receiving a classical education at school, she first encountered critical theory as an undergraduate. She studied English literature at the University of Oxford.

She has been a contributor to UnHerd, most recently as contributing editor, since 2019.

In 2023, a book release event for Feminism Against Progress at the Georgia Room in New York City was cancelled after the venue received critical responses on social media regarding Harrington's opposition to surgeries for transgender youth.

== Personal life ==
Harrington is married and has one daughter.

== Books ==
- Feminism Against Progress (Forum Press, 2023) ISBN 978-1800752023
