= The Case Against the Sexual Revolution =

Book by Louise Perry

- Author: Louise Perry
- Publisher: Polity
- Publication date: 2022
- Pages: 284
- ISBN: 978-1-5095-5000-5

The Case Against the Sexual Revolution is a book by British journalist Louise Perry, published by Polity, which comments on sex in the twenty-first century. The book has a foreword by Kathleen Stock.

In the book, Perry, a columnist at the New Statesman, compares liberal feminists surrounding sex to capitalism. Perry argues that effective means of contraception has benefited men by representing sex as a recreational activity. Perry explores the abuse of women who produce pornography, arguing the notion of consent can mask harms and the association between pornography and violent sexual behaviour. Considering men, Perry notes the temporal correlation between erectile dysfunction and the use of pornography.

Perry draws upon her experience of working in a rape crisis centre to argue that liberal feminism minimises the sex differences, resulting in an unwillingness to consider what women can do to reduce the risk of sexual assault in a desire to avoid victim blaming. Perry argues that the idea that rape is motivated by the desire for power may be incorrect, with the underlying cause sometimes being a desire for sexual gratification. Perry argues that the sex-positive movement requires women to not comment on certain sexual behaviours such as kinks, sex work, and engage in sexual behaviour like men. Perry expresses alarm at the sexual practice of choking, noting an increase in the practice and concern regarding the rough sex murder defence.

== Synopsis ==
The book comprises eight chapters, a foreword and an epilogue.

The first chapter, "Sex Must Be Taken Seriously", argues that historic sexual liberation has advantaged men who desire casual sex in addition to giving women control over their reproduction, contrasting Marilyn Monroe, who engaged in substance abuse and died by suicide, to "playboy" Hugh Hefner. The epilogue, Listen to your mother, argues that individuals behaviour can act against incentive structures and offers advice for young women, including: distrusting ideologies that disagree with naive morality, arguing in favour of chivalry; that it is sometimes possible to identify sexually aggressive men by personality traits; advising women to avoid men who are aroused by violence, that consent workshops have little value; avoiding being intoxicated in mixed groups; avoiding dating apps; delaying sex in relationships for a few months; only having relationships with men who you think would be a good father, as a judgment of character; and, that monogamous marriage is the best basis for child rearing.

The second chapter, "Men and Women are Different", comments on sex differences, noting the particular effect in physical strength with most men allegedly being able to kill most women with their bare hands. Perry contrasts the Google/James Damore affair with the Eton College/Will Knowland controversies, saying that she agrees with Damore's analysis that sex differences in psychology may contribute to gender disparity but that Knowland's views on sex differences were at times untrue and showed a lack of understanding of feminism. Perry contrasts the book A Natural History of Rape to the feminist Against Our Will and argues that there is a biological component to rape.

The third chapter, "Some Desires are Bad", citing ideas of psychologist Jonathan Haidt and conservative essayist G. K. Chesterton, argues that sexual liberalism encourages people to abandon moral intuitions regarding sexual norms, and dismisses traditional institutions surrounding sexual relations without understanding them based on a narrative of progress. Perry argues in favour of forms of sexual repression. Perry gives opinions surrounding pedophilia in France including support for lower age of consent by French philosophers including Simone de Beauvoir and Michel Foucault as a case study of such abandonment of intuition and institution.

The fourth chapter, "Loveless Sex Is Not Empowering", argues that liberal feminism promotes women "having sex like a man", citing television shows Sex and the City and The Fall as examples. It explores the average "sociosexuality gap" between sexes with explanations from evolutionary psychology such as the work of Anne Campbell, corrobatory evidence from the differences of sexual practices of homosexual men and women, and sex differences in rates of use of prostitution.

The fifth chapter, "Consent Is Not Enough", explores the predatory aspects of pornography. It comments on cases of videos of sexual abuse being hosted on MindGeek websites such as Pornhub. Perry cites David Courtwright's concept of limbic capitalism where companies make use of low level limbic impulses to make profit, noting that users of pornography websites can be conflicted about their usage.

In the sixth chapter, "Violence Is Not Love", Perry comments on the fact that a minority of women enjoy BDSM, arguing that this arises due to male commitment and displays of affection being a biological component of women's sexual attraction. Perry explores feminists' conceptions of BDSM, comparing Angela Carter's The Sadeian Woman and the Ideology of Pornography and Andrea Dworkin's response, arguing that some modern liberal feminists accept BDSM, such as Roxane Gay. Perry expresses concerns about acceptance of violent forms of sex, including the prevalence of choking, the emergence of the rough sex murder defense (addressed by her charity We Can't Consent To This), and concerns that this acceptance may lead women into violent relationships.

In the seventh chapter, "People Are Not Products", Perry argues that prostitution was historically a solution to the "sociosexuality gap" between sexes, by having a class of prostitutes separate from the main female population for men to engage in low commitment sexual activity with.

In the eighth and final chapter, "Marriage Is Good", Perry argues that while lifelong monogamy is not common in most cultures, it is valuable because it "tames" men by forcing them to become respectful to obtain sexual relations. Perry advocates for marriage, and discourages divorce, particularly if you have children.

== Reception ==
Reviewing in The Guardian, Rachel Cooke said that the book was provocative and said the unsayable. Cooke disagrees with Perry about marriage, arguing that unhappy marriages are bad for children. Suzanne Moore writing in The Telegraph said that, while she did not agree with Perry's suggested solution, she felt Perry was asking the right questions.

Reviewing in The Times, Susie Goldsbrough expresses uncertainty at Perry's belief that women cannot enjoy casual sex, arguing that historic norms due to pregnancy and disparities in sexual satisfaction between men and women engaging in casual sex may be a factor.

Writing in the New Statesman, Gaby Hinsliff feels that Perry's solutions such as personally not consuming pornography and avoiding dating apps in preference to seeking relationships with friends of friends are not convincing. She feels that in considering gender differences in psychology, Perry is too much in favour of biological explanations rather than social factors, given the work of psychologists like Cordelia Fine. Hinsliff concludes that the book considers longstanding tensions between freedom and safety, and pleasure and shame in the context of the current time, and addresses the gap between "online" feminism and the actual thoughts, feelings and behaviour of women in private.
