= Reactionary feminism =

Feminism that embraces reactionary politics

Reactionary feminism is a conservative variant of feminism that emphasizes traditional gender roles, heteronormativity, and the family as solutions to women's socio-economic challenges. The term originated in a 2021 article by the author Mary Harrington and was later expanded upon in her book Feminism Against Progress. Helen Joyce and Louise Perry have also been associated with reactionary feminism.

Reactionary feminists argue that progressive politics deny biologically based, evolutionarily determined differences between men and women. Many reactionary feminists are anti-abortion. They align with aspects of maternal feminism and reject the sexual revolution. Reactionary feminism attributes the increased acceptance of transgender identities to technological advancements in biotechnology since the 1960s.

== See also ==
- Anti-gender movement – International movement opposed to the concept of gender identity
- Conservative variants of feminism
- Difference feminism – Opposition to equality feminism
- Fourth-wave feminism – Feminist movement, 2010s–present
- Tradwife – Woman promoting traditional gender roles
- Trans-exclusionary radical feminism – Movement originating within radical feminism
