= Charles Wollstonecraft =

U.S. Army officer (1770–1817)

- Born: 1770; Beverley, Yorkshire, Great Britain
- Died: September 28, 1817 (aged 46–47); New Orleans, Louisiana, U.S.
- Known for: Farmer, U.S. Army officer
- Relatives: Mary Wollstonecraft (sister)

Charles Wollstonecraft (1770–October 31, 1817) was an American military officer. The brother of English feminist Mary Wollstonecraft, he moved to the United States where he became a farmer, land speculator, and eventually an officer in the army. Based in Philadelphia during his early years in the States, he was stationed in the lower Mississippi River valley for most of his military career.

== Biography ==
Charles Wollstonecraft was the youngest of the Wollstonecraft children. In October 1792, Wollstonecraft emigrated from Carmarthen, South Wales, to the United States. In 1794, Wollstonecraft bought a little more than 10,000 acres in the vicinity of Loyalsock Creek and Muncy Creek, Pennsylvania, from Samuel Wallis. This land was possibly intended for use by his sister and others as "a settlement for a communal English literary colony." His occupations included farming and land speculation. A letter from Charles in June 1794 was how the Wollstonecraft sisters in England found out that Mary had "married" Gilbert Imlay.

In 1795 he invested in a calico mill near Wilmington, Delaware. In 1796, when he "resided near the Philadelphia waterfront, in the High Street ward," his courtship of one Mary Meredith "almost led to a duel" with Meredith's brother's business partner, David Andrews.

In the shadow of the Quasi-War with France, he joined the United States Army in spring 1798. His first commission, signed by John Adams, was at the rank of lieutenant. He was in the regular army "for essentially the rest of his life." In 1799 his Carlisle, Pennsylvania-based artillery company was mobilized to Fries's Rebellion but did not see combat.

He was eventually promoted to major and stationed at Natchitoches on the Red River. He was ranked as a captain as of 1808. In 1810, he was involved in the Spanish–American–Indigenous conflict over the Neutral Ground between the U.S. state of Louisiana and Spanish Texas. The Spanish governor of Texas, Manuel Salcedo, and American colonel Thomas Cushing corresponded about clearing the Neutral Ground of those whom Wollstonecraft described as "desperate characters accustomed to plunder." The joint patrol was Salcedo's idea but Wollstonecraft sent it up the U.S. chain of command and got it approved. Wollstonecraft gave Lt. Augustus Magee command of 18 soldiers for the mission on July 29, 1810. The joint patrol burned 12 buildings, removed 34 people, and left cattle and cornfields intact. Military historian Samuel Watson calls the original improvised Neutral Ground agreement and the joint patrol and an example of "actions by 'men on the spot'" that detoured around civic oversight and military command to solve short-term problems in the short term.

Wollstonecraft, in his capacity as an artillery officer, appears in accounts of the Gutiérrez-Magee Expedition of 1812–1813, which was a "freelance imperialism" conspiracy to take some or all of Spanish Texas–Mexico for the Americans. Historians are not clear on to what degree the United States government was involved, but they were not unaware. Wollstonecraft's company "may have conveyed [cannon] to the filibusters or their intermediaries (perhaps in the [Natchitoches] militia), or the guns (whether military or civilian in origin) may have been left unguarded to be taken by the filibusters." He later made a report to General James Wilkinson that had encountered more than 100 men "traveling to join" the expedition and "the will to break up 'banditti' in the Neutral Ground seems to have evaporated." In August 1812, "Wollstonecraft reported that the Natchitoches militia had joined the filibusters 'to a man,' that a former territorial legislator was recruiting among the militia in Rapides Parish, and that more men were coming from Natchez."

During the 1812–1814 campaign to rid the Gulf of Mexico of "the Baratarian Corsairs" (slave-trading privateers informally led by Jean Lafitte and Pierre Lafitte), Wollstonecraft was a rare officer who was not "intimately connected to Louisiana men of affairs" (men who economically benefited, long-term at least, from the actions of the Lafittes). Wollstonecraft was therefore more "easily irritated and criticized the federal customs collector for failing to show up after he had called for the captain's assistance."

Wollstonecraft died in New Orleans in 1817.

== See also ==
- Walter Overton

== Sources ==
- Bodle, Wayne (Winter 2025). "Charles Wollstonecraft in Pennsylvania, 1792–1801: 'A Man of Good Sense and Information.' (...or 'Irritable but not Vindictive'?)". Pennsylvania History: A Journal of Mid-Atlantic Studies. 92 (1). Pennsylvania Historical Association: 130–157. doi:10.5325/pennhistory.92.1.0130. ISSN 0031-4528. Project MUSE book 949938.
- Branson, Susan (Spring 1996). "Women and the Family Economy in the Early Republic: The Case of Elizabeth Meredith". Journal of the Early Republic. 16 (1): 47–71. doi:10.2307/3124284. JSTOR 3124284.
- Kastor, Peter J. (October 2001). ""Motives of Peculiar Urgency": Local Diplomacy in Louisiana, 1803–1821". The William and Mary Quarterly. 58 (4): 819–848. doi:10.2307/2674501. JSTOR 2674501.
- Watson, Samuel J. (2012). Jackson's Sword: The Army Officer Corps on the American Frontier, 1810–1821. Modern War Studies. Lawrence: University Press of Kansas. ISBN 978-0-7006-1884-2. LCCN 2012027879. OCLC 788282695.
- Wilkinson, Norman B. (July 1953). "Mr. Davy's Diary 1794 – Part II". Pennsylvania History: A Journal of Mid-Atlantic Studies. 20 (3): 258–279. ISSN 0031-4528. JSTOR 27769431.
