= Rosalind Barnett =

American psychologist

Rosalind Chait Barnett
- Education: Harvard University
- Scientific career
- Fields: social science, psychology
- Website: rosalindbarnettphd.com

Rosalind C. Barnett is an American research psychologist and author. She has hosted the annual Ann Richards Roundtable on Gender and the Media at Brandeis University.

Barnett attended Queens College and received her Ph.D. in clinical psychology from Harvard University. She has held senior research positions at the Henry A. Murray Research Institute at Harvard University, the Wellesley College Centers for Women, and Brandeis University.

The National Institute of Mental Health funded her study of Family and Work Role Stress in Men, and a study of Patterns of Competence in Preschool Girls. The National Science Foundation funded a study of Women in the Middle Years and the Alfred P. Sloan Foundation has funded her research on work/family issues. Her primary areas of expertise include the work-family interface, gender similarities and differences, gender stereotypes, obstacles confronting women in the workplace, and ongoing adaptations to an aging workforce.

Barnett has published books and articles with co-author Caryl Rivers, Professor of Journalism at Boston University.

== Fellowships and honors ==
- Phi Beta Kappa
- Woodrow Wilson Honorary Fellowship
- Recipient of the American Personnel and Guidance Association's Annual Award for Outstanding Research
- Who's Who of American Women (9th, 21st, and 22nd editions)
- 2008-09 – Anne Roe Award for contributions in women's education, Harvard University,
- 1999 – Rosabeth Moss Kanter Award for Excellence in Research on Work-Family Research (2000, 2001, 2002, 2003)
- 1997 – Goldsmith Research Award, Harvard University, Kennedy School of Government
- 1997 – ANBAR, Citation of Excellence
- 1996 – Best Paper Award: Journal of Organizational Behavior
- 1988 – National Books for a Better Life Award
- 1975-1976 – Radcliffe College Graduate Society Distinguished Achievement Medal

== Publications ==
=== Books ===
Barnett, R. C. & Rivers, C. (2016). The age of longevity: Reimagining tomorrow for our new long lives, New York, Rowman & Littlefield. ISBN 978-0810895607

Rivers, C., & Barnett, R. C. (2013). The new soft war against Women: Why the US economy will falter if it succeeds, New York, Tarcher/Penguin. ISBN 978-0399176395

Rivers, C., & Barnett, R. C. (2011). Truth about girls and boys: Challenging toxic stereotypes about our children, New York, Columbia University Press. ISBN 978-0231151634

Barnett, R. C., & Rivers, C. (2004). Same difference: How gender myths are hurting our relationships, our children, and our jobs. New York: Basic Books. ISBN 978-0465006106

Barnett, R. C., & Rivers, C. (1998). She works/he works: How two-income families are happier, healthier and better off. Cambridge, MA: Harvard University Press. ISBN 978-0674805958

Barnett, R. C., Biener, L., & Baruch, G. K. (Eds.). (1987). Gender and stress. New York: Free Press. ISBN 978-0029013809

Baruch, G., Barnett, R. C., & Rivers, C. (1985). Life prints: New patterns of love and work for today's women. New York: Signet. ISBN 978-0070529816

Rivers, C., Barnett, R. C., & Baruch, G. K. (1979). Beyond sugar and spice. New York: G.P. Putnam's. ISBN 978-0399121647

Barnett, R., & Baruch, G. K (1978). The competent woman: Perspectives on socialization. New York: Irvington/Halstead. ISBN 978-0470264249

Tagiuri, R., Lawrence, P. R., Barnett, R. C., & Dunphy, D. (1968). Behavioral science concepts in case analysis: The relationship of ideas to management action. Boston: Division of Research, Graduate School of Business Administration, Harvard University.

==== Peer-reviewed articles ====
1. Barnett, R. C. (2004). Women and multiple roles: Myths and reality. Harvard Review of Psychiatry, 12(3), 158–164.
2. Barnett, R. C. (2004). Women and work: Where are we, where did we come from, and where are we going? Journal of Social Issues, 60(4), 667–674. (Recipient of a "One of the Top Five Downloaded Articles in Blackwell Synergy in 2005 Award")
3. Barnett, R. C., & Brennan, R. T. (1995). The relationship between job experiences and psychological distress: A structural equation approach. Journal of Organizational Behavior, 16, 259–276.
4. Barnett, R. C., Brennan, R. T., Raudenbush, S. W., Pleck, J. H., & Marshall, N. L. (1995). Change in job and marital experiences and change in psychological distress: A longitudinal study of dual-earner couples. Journal of Personality and Social Psychology,69, 839–850. Listed in International Bibliography of the Social Sciences: Sociology. London: Routledge, 1995.
5. Barnett, R. C., & Hyde, J.S. (2001). Women, men, work and family: An expansionist theory. The American Psychologist, 56(10), 781–796.
6. Barnett, R. C., Marshall, N. L., Raudenbush, S., & Brennan, R. (1993). Gender and the relationship between job experiences and psychological distress: A study of dual-earner couples. Journal of Personality and Social Psychology, 65(5), 794–806.
7. Barnett, R .C., & Brennan, R. T. (1997). Change in job conditions, change in psychological distress, and gender: A longitudinal study of dual-earner couples. Journal of Organizational Behavior, 18, 253–274. Awarded “Best Paper of 1997” by the Journal of Organizational Behavior. Also awarded “Citation of Excellence, Highest Quality Rating” by ANBAR Electronic Intelligence.
8. Brennan, R. T., Barnett, R. C., & Gareis, K. C. (2001). When she earns more than he does: A longitudinal study of dual-earner couples. Journal of Marriage and the Family, 63, 168–182.
