= Louise Perry =

British journalist and author (born 1992)

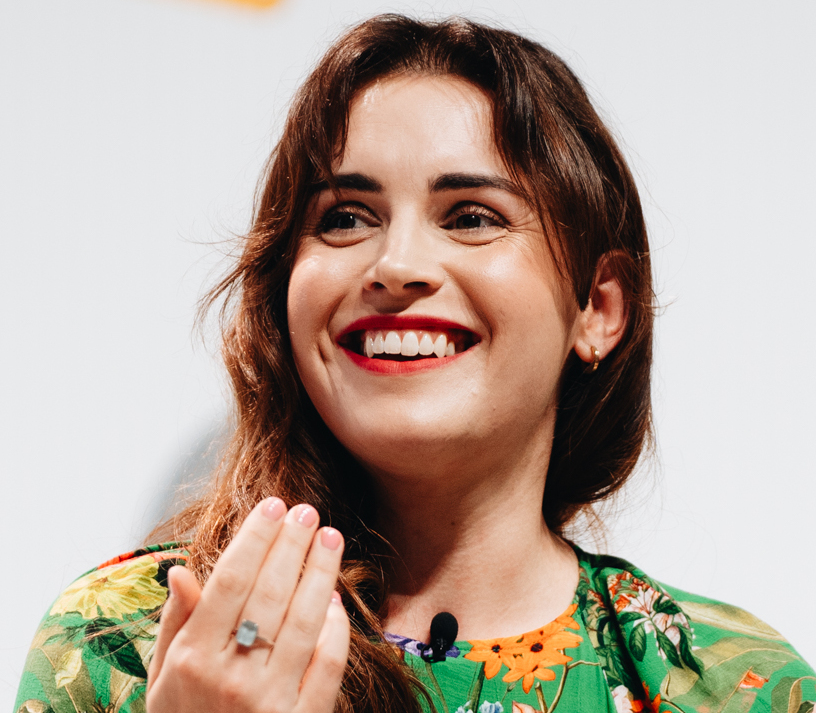
- Louise Perry, 2023
- Born: 1992 (age 33–34)
- Citizenship: British
- Education: SOAS University of London
- Occupations: Journalist, podcast host
- Children: 2
- Writing career
- Language: English
- Website: louisemperry.co.uk

Louise Perry is a British journalist, author and podcast host. She is a featured writer for the Daily Mail, a columnist at the New Statesman, and has been described as a leading reactionary feminist. She has been quoted as saying “Reactionary feminism starts from the assumption of crucial biological difference.”

Perry co-runs the charity We Can't Consent To This, which campaigns around problems with the rough sex murder defence. She is the co-founder and research director of The Other Half, a non-partisan feminist think tank which was founded in 2022. She is the host of the podcast Maiden Mother Matriarch.

== Education ==
Perry graduated from University of London's SOAS with a bachelor's degree in anthropology, which reportedly included women's studies. She became opposed to pornography, BDSM, and sex work after working for several years as a journalist in a rape crisis centre. Her employment there formed the basis of her first book, The Case Against the Sexual Revolution. Published in 2022, the book became a bestseller in the United Kingdom. The book argues for gender essentialism. Journalist Helen Lewis, writing for The Atlantic, described the book's thesis as "heretical," arguing that it contradicts the feminist idea that gender differences are the result of socialization. The Guardian characterised the work as "radical," stating that it challenges prevailing norms while being well-researched and clearly written.

== Career ==
In February 2022, Perry participated in a debate at the Oxford Union, opposing the motion "We Should Welcome the New Era of Porn". She cited evidence of high suicide rates among adult entertainment industry performers, questioned the notion of informed consent among young adult actors, and urged the audience to avoid internet pornography.

Since February 2023, Perry has been hosting Maiden Mother Matriarch, a weekly podcast exploring topics such as feminism, gender rights, societal roles, and the cultural impacts of sexual norms. Guests have included a range of academics, writers, and social figures, such as Ayaan Hirsi Ali, Kathleen Stock, Bryan Caplan, Helen Joyce, Julie Bindel, Christopher Caldwell, Gad Saad, Tom Holland, J. Michael Bailey, David Betz, Anna Machin, Diane Purkiss, Katharine Birbalsingh, Sarah Haider, Robin Hanson, Eric Kaufmann, and Geoffrey Miller.

In October 2023, Perry published an essay in First Things on the persistent conflict between pagan and Christian values in the West. The article was discussed in National Review, which described Perry as presenting a non-Christian argument in favour of Christian ethics. She argued that debates on abortion policy reflect broader discussions about whether society should retain its Christian foundations and how historical Christian values have shaped attitudes towards the vulnerable.

On 13 September 2023, Perry participated in a debate on the topic "Has the Sexual Revolution Failed?", together with Anna Khachiyan, and against Grimes and Sarah Haider. The debate, promoted as "a clash of the female titans", was held at The Theatre at Ace Hotel in Los Angeles and was moderated by Bari Weiss.

Perry was also a speaker at the first conference of the Alliance for Responsible Citizenship in late 2023. In her panel discussion, she argued that both women and society more broadly had been negatively affected by the abandonment of conservative sexual norms.

In January 2026, Perry published a New York Times guest essay titled "The Harry Potter Generation Needs to Grow Up," arguing that "the increasing illiberalism of young Americans" differentiates members of Generation Z from millennials who grew up with the Potter series. In June 2026, she was a guest on the New York Times's Interesting Times podcast hosted by Ross Douthat.

== Personal life ==
In 2017, Perry married a police officer. She gave birth to the couple's first son in 2021. The couple welcomed a second son in autumn 2024. They reside in London.

Perry became a Christian some time after writing The Case Against the Sexual Revolution. In a 2025 interview for the Macdonald-Laurier Institute's Inside Policy Talks podcast, she explained that her decision was influenced by observing how Christian teachings corresponded with sociological realities, particularly in relation to monogamous marriage. Perry stated, "if [Christianity is] supernaturally true, you would expect it to be sociologically true. And observing quite how sociologically true it is was very persuasive to me." She also noted that she had become more inclined to articulate her arguments in theological terms.
