= Memoirs of Modern Philosophers =

1800 novel by Elizabeth Hamilton

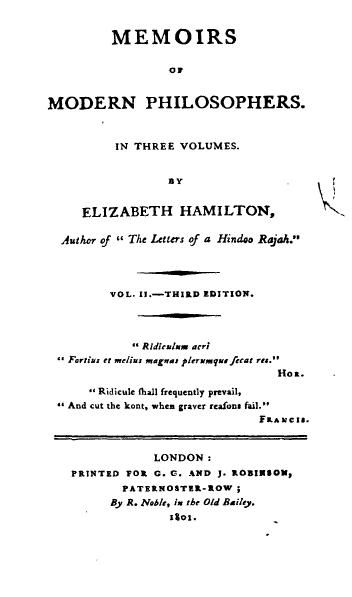
Elizabeth Hamilton's name did not appear on the title page of Modern Philosophers until the third edition.

Memoirs of Modern Philosophers is a novel by British author Elizabeth Hamilton published in 1800. Responding to the Revolution Controversy of the 1790s and the debates about what roles women should occupy in English society, the novel contends that a poor education limits women's opportunities while at the same time arguing they should limit their activities to the domestic sphere. It occupies a middle ground between the liberal arguments of novelists such as Mary Hays and the conservative arguments by writers such as Hannah More.

== Historical context ==
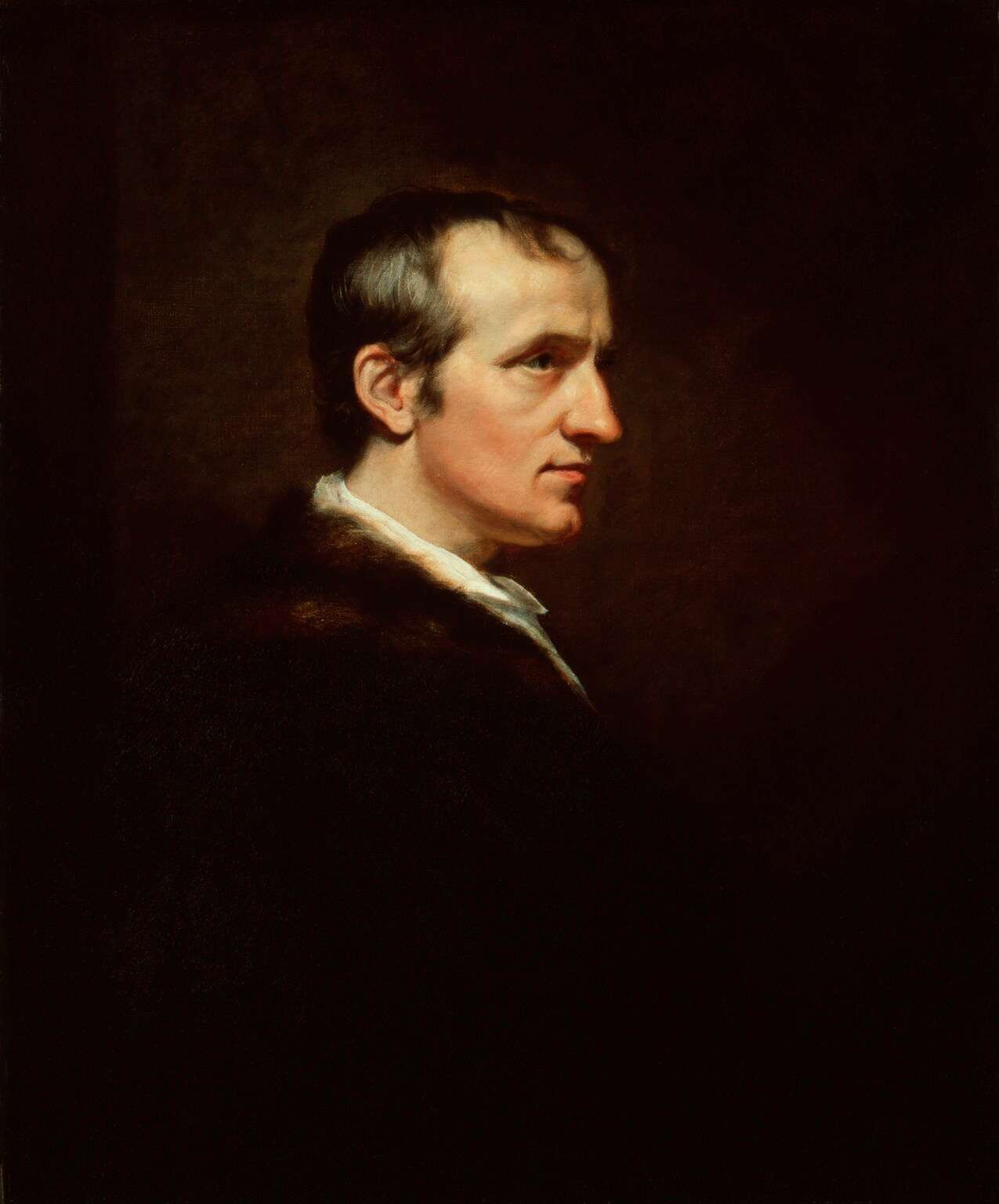
Modern Philosophers responds to and criticizes the philosophy of William Godwin, or the "New Philosophy".

Modern Philosophers was part of the Revolution Controversy of the 1790s, when Britons were debating “revolutionary ideas about a broader franchise, primogeniture, meritocracy, marriage and divorce”. The disenfranchised middle-class and other English Jacobins (so-called by their detractors) wanted “to force a redistribution of power and status” while the Loyalists, who had power, wanted to retain the status quo. The key texts of this debate were Edmund Burke’s Reflections on the Revolution in France (1790), Thomas Paine’s Rights of Man (1791), Mary Wollstonecraft’s A Vindication of the Rights of Woman (1792), and William Godwin’s Political Justice (1793) and The Enquirer (1797). Hamilton assumes her readers know these works well; she makes many allusions and satirical references to them.

Women participated in this debate by writing poems, conduct books, novels, children’s literature, and plays that addressed women’s issues specifically, namely the need for a good education, legal status, and the ability to be economically independent. Thus, the reading material of women became a political topic. Novels such as Modern Philosophers played a large role in this debate, since they were widely read and easily available. Discussion about women’s rights took place in novels because the genre itself was perceived as feminine and it was the most accessible kind of literature to women. Women were supposedly more receptive to fiction than men because of the small purview of their lives. Loyalists such as Hannah More argued that this was because “there is a different bent of understanding in the sexes” while Jacobins such as Wollstonecraft argued that “there is no sex in the soul or mind” and women were only limited by their inadequate educations. Hamilton herself occupied a middle ground, arguing that women were capable of achieving more than they currently did but that their poor education held them back. Unlike the English Jacobins, however, she believed that women should only participate in the domestic sphere. Hamilton's novel argues for moderate reform, reform based on middle-class morality and Christianity.

== Themes ==
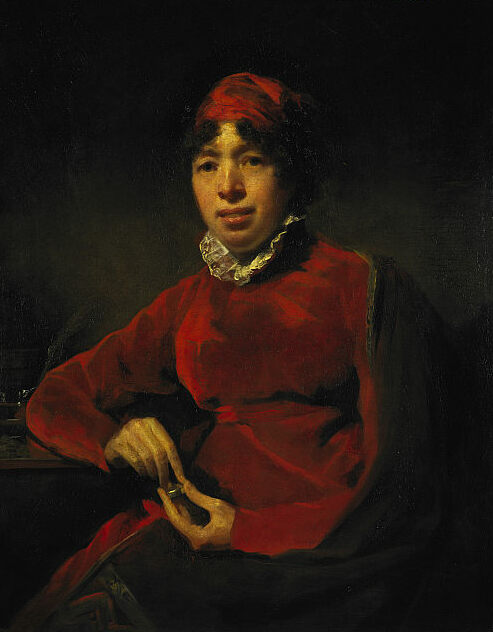
Maria Edgeworth wrote that Hamilton (pictured) was "an original, agreeable, and successful writer of fiction".

Hamilton wrote that the aim of her work was “not to pass an indiscriminate censor on that ingenious, and in many parts admirable performance, but to expose the dangerous tendencies of those parts of [Godwin’s] theory which might, by a bad man, be converted into an engine of mischief, and be made the means of ensnaring innocence and virtue” She wanted to warn readers against the dangerous tendencies of the New Philosophy associated with Godwin, Wollstonecraft, and Paine, particularly its emphasis on individualism; she viewed it as self-indulgent and egotistical.

Hamilton uses three protagonists to comment on the debate surrounding women's roles in society: Julia Delmond, Bridgetina Botherim, and Harriet Orwell. Julia falls prey to New Philosophical ideas because she has little education and is spoiled by her father; he fails to guide her reading. She ends up eloping with Vallaton, a “vagabond” pretending to be a philosopher; after she becomes pregnant, he abandons her and she falls into poverty. Her conversion to Christianity and repentance convince Bridgetina to ultimately reject the New Philosophy and to avoid Julia's fate.

Bridgetina is a parody of the English Jacobin writer Mary Hays and the fictional account of her life in Memoirs of Emma Courtney (1796). As Grogan explains, “this work was viewed by the Loyalist camp with horror and disgust as it epitomized all the sexual promiscuity and female forwardness they feared resulted from adopting ‘revolutionary principles.’” Bridgetina adopts New Philosophical ideas and as a result insults her mother and openly declares her love to her beloved. She is a careless and uncomprehending reader, often simply parroting what she has read. Bridgetina is not a real reformer as the Christian characters in the novel are—she only uses her knowledge of the New Philosophy to impress others.

Harriet is juxtaposed to Julia. She has an aunt and a father who advise her; she reads carefully and skeptically and is a Christian. Harriet’s virtues are firmly based in religion: learning, self-control, and responsibility. Unlike Julia and Brigetina, Harriet restrains herself when it comes to love. While the other two protagonists selfishly follow their passions, Harriet refuses to ally herself with Henry Sydney while he is poor, since such a marriage would harm his career and make both unhappy. In the end, she is rewarded for this, as Mrs. Fielding leaves money to the couple to enable them to marry.

Hamilton’s comparison of the three protagonists encourages the reader to assess what is proper and improper behavior for a woman—this “reflects Hamilton’s belief that females should learn to think rather than just to obey”, which aligns her with English Jacobins such as Wollstonecraft rather than Loyalist writers. The important role that reading plays in the novel connects her more closely with the English Jacobins than with the Loyalists as well. While many Loyalists argued that women should not have access to a great deal of written material, Hamilton contended that since such control is impossible, teaching women to read carefully and thoughtfully is the best course.

Modern Philosophers is not just about women, however. The implicit comparisons between Mr. Gubbles, who abandons his job and family after subscribing to the New Philosophy, and Dr. Orwell and Henry Sydney who are "well-read, open-minded, compassionate and civil, but for whom moral conduct and religious faith are lode stars", suggests that Hamilton was more interested in particular virtues than in class or gender.

== Style ==
Modern Philosophers is written in the third person, which differentiates it from the first person narratives of English Jacobins such as Wollstonecraft's The Wrongs of Woman (1798) and Hays's Emma Courtney. The omniscient narrator presents the story and commentary on it, reducing readers' ability to judge the meaning of the story for themselves.

== Publication and reception ==
Two editions of the novel were published in 1800 and a third in 1801—the first sold out in two months. Hamilton's name was included on the title page only with the third edition. In an “Advertisement” appended to this edition, Hamilton explains, “the Author of the …Memoirs resolved to introduce the first edition under a signature evidently fictitious” because “even the sex, of a writer may unwittingly bias the reader’s mind.” A fourth edition was released in 1804.

The Anti-Jacobin Review described Modern Philosophers as “the first novel of the day” and as evidence “that all the female writers of the day are not corrupted by the voluptuous dogmas of Mary Godwin, or her more profligate imitators”.

Hamilton gained fame from Modern Philosophers, but she only wrote one more novel, the popular Cottagers of Glenburnie (1808). She turned instead to writing religious and educational treatises, such as Letters on Education (1801). George III granted her a pension for this work in 1804.

== Bibliography ==
- Grogan, Claire. “Introduction” and “A Note on the Text”. Memoirs of Modern Philosophers. Peterborough: Broadview Press, 2000.
