= Gina Luria Walker =

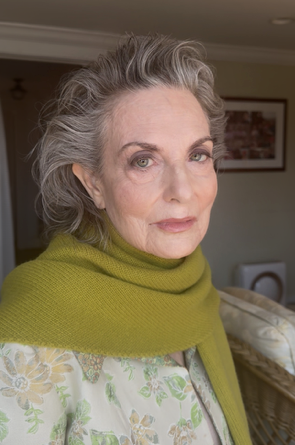
- Born: Brooklyn, New York, USA
- Known for: The New Historia

Academic background
- Education: Barnard College (B.A.); Columbia University (M.A.); New York University (Ph.D)

Academic work
- Discipline: Intellectual History, Gender Studies
- Institutions: The New School; Rutgers University; Sarah Lawrence College

Gina Luria Walker is professor emerita of women's studies and director of a web-based resource about women called The New Historia. She teaches women's intellectual history, and is an expert on eighteenth-century feminist intellectual Mary Hays and her circle. Walker produced the first contemporary scholarly edition of Hays's major work, Female Biography; or, Memoirs of Illustrious and Celebrated Women of All Ages and Countries.

Walker's focus is recovering lost contributions of women. In 2015, Walker worked with the Elizabeth A. Sackler Center for Feminist Art at the Brooklyn Museum to direct Project Continua, a website of female biographies. Her latest work in recovering women displaced from the historical record is The New Historia, a project that is an encyclopedia of female networks and intellectual contributions. The project launched online in March 2022. Her collaborator on this project is information architect Lisa Strausfeld, and together their vision is to create a "Google Earth for knowledge."

Walker has held faculty appointments at Rutgers University, Northwestern University (as the Assistant Director of the Program on Women), and as a Guest Facility at Sarah Lawrence College. Walker retired from The New School after 32 years and is now Professor Emerita of Women's Studies.

== Biography ==
Gina Luria Walker received her Ph.D. in 18th Century Literature from New York University, where she was awarded the Founders' Day Award for doctoral studies. These included her discovery of primary documents by and about Mary Hays (1759–1843) in private hands, now part of the Carl H. Pforzheimer Collection of Shelley and His Circle at The New York Public Library. Her areas of research include the history of learned women, women and Rational Dissent, late Enlightenment Feminisms, and women's autodidactic production of new knowledge.

Walker is a member of the International Advisory Board, UDC International Doctoral School, Universidade da Coruña, Spain and on the Advisory Editorial Board, Enlightenment and Dissent, Dr Williams's Centre for Dissenting Studies, Queen Mary University of London. She is involved in encouraging new Wikipedia encyclopedia articles on historical women and is an authority on historical encyclopedias.

== Education and Doctoral Research ==
Walker completed her undergraduate work at Barnard College and earned her master's degree in English Literature at Columbia University.

Walker's interest in feminist historical recovery crystallized during a required Novel course at Barnard College when she was an undergraduate. In the course, Walker read George Eliot novel Middlemarch (1871), where she found Eliot's portrayal of Tertius Lygate's scientific "intellectual passion" to describe her interest in documenting women as missing historical figures. Walker also read F. R. Leavis's literary criticism, The Great Tradition (1948), in which he credited Jane Austen as the sole precursor to George Eliot's work. Given her interest in the "epistemological authority of women as historical subjects," Walker was hesitant to believe Leavis's reductionist claim.

At Columbia, where she pursued a Master's Degree, she intended to study the writer Jane Austen, placing her in the intellectual spectrum of the late Enlightenment. The graduate student adviser discouraged her by saying, "All you Barnard girls want to write about Austen. There is nothing more to be learned about Jane Austen." The professor directed Walker to write her thesis on the personal writings of James Boswell using his recently discovered journals as source material, viewed through the prism of Jean-Paul Sartre's Being and Nothingness (1943). Her advisor praised her thesis but told her she was "too pretty to bother getting a Ph.D." and advised her to "go home and get married."

Greatly discouraged, she applied to New York University to pursue doctoral research. She explained to the Graduate Advisor more carefully that she wanted to study "a highly self-conscious woman on the margins of the late Enlightenment".She had the good fortune to be introduced to Kenneth Neill Cameron (1908–1994), an Oxford-trained scholar and expert on Percy Bysshe Shelley, who became her dissertation director. Cameron agreed that she could study Jane Austen. It was he who first encouraged her to visit the New York Public Library's Carl H. Pforzheimer Collection, of which he was the founding director, to see what information was available about Mary Hays. What she found "changed [her] life."

=== Mary Hays ===
After researching the available material on Mary Hays in the Pforzheimer Library, Walker received a grant from the Pforzheimer to meet with the owner of Hays's private correspondence in London. The owner was reluctant to share them because she understood Hays as a controversial feminist figure during her lifetime who wrote about illicit passion and "even suicide!" Her writing was criticized for questioning the inequality of the sexes, and she was personally attacked for pursuing knowledge (historically, a male occupation) and being homely. In 1800, Samuel Taylor Coleridge referred to her as "a Thing, ugly and petticoated."

Eventually, the owner of the letters allowed Walker to view the 115 private letters to and from Hays in correspondence with Mary Wollstonecraft, William Godwin, Mary Shelley, Robert Southey, Eliza Fenwick and others. In her 2018 essay "I Sought & Made to Myself an Extraordinary Destiny," Walker describes the relationship between a female scholar and her subject. Amid contemporaneous "textual sabotage" that depicted Hays as unpleasant and sexually immoral, Walker recounts the journey to redefine Hays's legacy through her revolutionary accomplishments. Walker's experience with Hays was complicated:

"While I wanted to understand, empathize with, and defend Hays, her authorial self was so unlike the wise, steady persona presented by Austen's narrators that had inspired me, that I, too, could not warm to her. She was angry, self-pitying, narcissistic, filled with resentment and yearning. Her unquiet spirit struggled against the tide of responses to her as unlovely, abrasive, and unlovable, confirmation that no respectable man would want her. Studying Hays seemed to take me further away from the apparently safe, hallowed shores of the Canon. I felt adrift; as an uncredentialled female autodidactic, Hays offered no safety."

In 1972, Walker earned a doctorate for her work on Mary Hays, for which she received NYU's highest academic honor, The Founder's Day Award. Hays' biographies of historical women struck Walker; she wondered why Hays undertook them, departing from her earlier philosophical work. Hays had been a close friend of the feminist philosopher Mary Wollstonecraft, author of A Vindication of the Rights of Woman. When Wollstonecraft died from complications of childbirth in 1797, Hays mourned her death by compiling biographies of 302 iconoclastic women. It was one of the earliest instances of feminist historical recovery.

Hays wrote to channel her pain and fortify herself by documenting the struggles and accomplishments of great female thinkers of the past. It was one of the earliest instances of feminist historical recovery. Hays wrote an Obituary of Wollstonecraft, unsigned (Letter to the Editor, Monthly Magazine 4 [September 1797], 232-33). "Quick to feel, and indignant to resist the iron hand of despotism, whether civil or intellectual, her exertions to awaken in the minds of her oppressed sex a sense of their degradation, and to restore them to the dignity of reason and virtue, were active and incessant: by her impassioned reasoning and glowing eloquence, the fabric of voluptuous prejudice has been shaken to its foundation, and totters towards its fall: while her philosophic mind, taking a wider range, perceived and lamented in the defects of civil institutions, interwoven in their texture, and inseparable from them, the causes of those partial evils, destructive to virtue and happiness, which poison social intercourse and deform domestic life."

Hays's instinct to document the lives of neglected historical women inspired the trajectory of Walker's career.

Walker has written and edited numerous books and articles regarding Mary Hays, including The Idea of Being Free: A Mary Hays's Reader (as editor, Broadview Press, 2006), Mary Hays: The Growth of a Woman's Mind (Ashgate, 2006, reissued by Routledge in 2018), The Chawton House Library Edition of Mary Hays's Female Biography; or Memoirs of Illustrious and Celebrated Women, of All Ages and Countries, 6 vols. (as editor, Pickering & Chatto, 2013, 2014), and Mary Hays's 'Female Biography': Collective Biography as Enlightenment Feminism (with Mary Spongberg, Routledge, 2019).

== Academic work ==
=== Female Biography Project ===
In 2009, the editorial board of the library at Chawton House - an estate once owned Jane Austen's brother that now supports the recovery of early women's writing - commissioned Walker to reproduce Mary Hays's Female Biography; or, Memoirs of Illustrious and Celebrated Women, Of All Ages and Countries (1803). Walker's edition was released in 2013 and 2014 by Pickering & Chatto Publishers.

In order to re-create Hays' work with the new evidence available, Walker established a network of 200 scholars. Working under the name Female Biography Project, they recovered historical material about women.

=== The Invention of Female Biography (2019) ===
The Invention of Female Biography contains essays from 14 members of the Female Biography Project (FBP) and documents the international scholarly collaboration that produced Walker's groundbreaking contribution to feminist historical recovery. Between 2009 and 2014, 168 scholars across 18 countries participated in the FBP, an unprecedented mission that created the Chawton House Library edition of Mary Hays's Female Biography; or, Memoirs of Illustrious and Celebrated Women of All Ages and Countries (1803).

The project assembled scholars, volunteers, and specialists in women's history. It used new knowledge, interdisciplinary communication, and a dedicated project website to revive and expand Hays's pioneering work, which included more than 300 entries. Walker's 2018 book "brings together essays that describe, elucidate and conceptualize the exhaustive research, unique editorial challenges and innovative responses of participants in the FBP."

The research generated has developed our understanding of Hays's contribution to women's history. In the process, it became apparent that there was more that might be learned from the study of Hays's text and other similar experiments in the space between women's history and women's life writing.

The Invention of Female Biography underscores the complexities of editing a female autodidact's work amid the misogynistic traditions, both through personal and cultural lenses. Brimming with vibrant perspectives, the essayists examine Hays's exploration of queenship (Spongberg and Woodacre), the abundance of classical women within her corpus (Plant), the Google digitization of missing resources (Whipp), and other rich subject matter. The contributors ponder whether perspectives and inaccuracies throughout Hays's oeuvre are symptomatic of the culture in which she lived—often, like the individuals she documented, Hays was forced to navigate gendered, linguistic, and male-centric epistemological barriers. Further, the scholars contemplate Hays's research process, writing strategies, and her access to sources of historical women "missing in action" (Woodacre).

The essays offer new insights into Hays's female subjects, drawing on recent discoveries from the Female Biography Project. The contributors consider the "time-traveling" effect of expanding Hays's work with contemporary knowledge. As Walker writes in the book's introduction, "the essays provide multiple critical lenses and point to concentric revolutions in the ways we study, conceptualize and represent earlier women." Hays's groundbreaking work, the first of its kind since Christine de Pizan's City of Ladies (1405), challenged the limitations of exclusionary Encyclopedism, a legacy carried on through the revolutionary work of the Female Biography Project.

=== Project Continua ===
Project Continua launched in 2012 as the online compendium to the Female Biography Project. The goal was to create a public, multimedia resource dedicated to the preservation of women's intellectual history from the earliest surviving evidence into the 21st century. "There have always been women producing knowledge and contributing to human understanding and participating in the great events and new ideas of their time," said Walker in an interview. "Most of whom have been ignored, trivialized, or written out." The project includes biographies and references to additional source material for scholars interested in conducting further research.

Project Continua's feminist work on Wikipedia was featured on Buzzfeed's list of "18 Badass Women You Probably Didn't Hear About In 2014."

In 2015, Walker collaborated with the Sackler Senior Curator, Catherine Morris, on a symposium. Titled "Revising Revisionism," the event was presented by The Elizabeth A. Sackler Center at The Brooklyn Museum with Project Continua. "Revising Revisionism" examined "the intersection of biography, art, history, historiography, and feminism—fields that align and diverge—by bringing together practitioners from different disciplines.

=== Wikipedia ===
Disturbed by the gender disparity of Wikipedia's content, Walker started an Edit-A-Thon in 2015 to train more women as Wikipedia editors. Wikipedia is the Internet's largest source of free information, yet less than ten percent of Wikipedia editors are women, and only six percent of experienced editors are women. This is reflected in the site's content which is distorted in favor of men's contributions to science and philosophy.

"Historically, Wikipedia may not be that different from the very first encyclopedias, which developed as a way for educated men to communicate with each other and create foundational knowledge" said Gina Luria Walker during an interview with The Atlantic. "Around 150 men contributed to the great encyclopedia of the Enlightenment, Walker pointed out, but no women did. The first version of Encyclopædia Britannica, written between 1768 and 1771, featured 39 pages on curing disease in horses, and three words on woman: 'female of man'."

In particular, Wikipedia suffers from an age-old sexist tendency, that of defining a woman by her relationship status with a man. "The pages that do exist about notable women are more likely to mention their gender and relationship status than articles about men."

"There needs to be a conscious collaborative determination by women, including girls, that we want to know about women of the past, we want to have access to our foremothers, and that we want to revise history", Walker said. "Every time a woman is denied the full weight of what she has achieved, it is a loss for all of us," Walker said.

=== The New Historia ===
==== Intent ====
In 2016, in response to the #MeToo movement, The New School initiated The New Historia as a signature university project. Walker and the scholars feared their research would follow a trajectory common to historical women: their stories would be included in publications, then treated anecdotally, and eventually lost and neglected, repeating the mistreatment of earlier women Walker, having exhumed biographical information about and philosophical writing by thousands of previously lost historical women and motivated by her Wikipedia project, wanted to publish her findings without bias and make them accessible to all. Thus, she began developing The New Historia as a non-traditional approach to preserving women's works.

Walker states her motivation for the initiative:

"More women wrote texts and contributed to society in the past than we can possibly believe. They left evidence of their lives and then disappeared; sometimes they were resurrected, only to be buried again. Their work was lost through either intentional destruction or neglect, leaving a void of women's historical invisibility. Our work today is reconstructing the lost knowledge of women's ideas and productions. If we persist in only studying women through the prisms of male-knowledge ordering systems, old inaccuracies will remain, and history will continue to ignore past female thinkers and actors and their transformative responses to the obdurate presence of historical misogyny."

The New Historia was a response to the assumption that women's history was a matter of "just adding women and stirring," that if stories of a few great women are added to the traditional canon, history is now "inclusive." Walker believed that the "truth is that with this approach the traditional, male-dominated history isn't challenged in any way - it's still the same narrative and interpretation, and over time, the women will continue to disappear from the narrative."

==== The New Historia Website, thenewhistoria.org ====
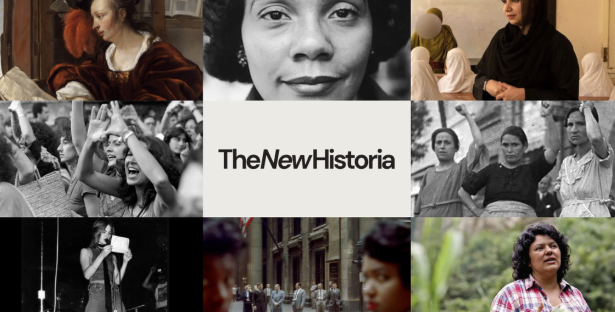
A screenshot of thenewhistoria.org homepage.

In 2018, to create an entirely new approach to feminist history, Walker began enlisting specialist scholars to examine important female figures throughout history and prevent women from "just being stirred in." As an easily navigable website, also referred to as "a Wikipedia for significant yet unseen women," The New Historia calls for accuracy and accountability in imagining undiscovered women. Walker's efforts intend to uncover buried women by making their work public and easily accessible. The New Historia was launched online by LopezLab in March 2022.

==== The New Historia Design and Content ====
Since its inception, thenewhistoria.org has published over 100 comprehensive profiles of trailblazing women—from Enheduanna, the first named author in history, to Vinnette Carroll, the first Black female Broadway director and Tony Award nominee. The website also includes more than 60 editorials and an "Emerging Voices" section featuring the work of Walker's students.

Users can access a collection of all-female historical figures to explore each woman's work, publications, and networks of relationships in a format known as the "schema." The schema presents subjects through a feminist lens, understanding that women "have never been part of the established cultures of learning." The schema format accommodates the nuance of a woman's life, presenting a well-rounded depiction of her transformations, contemporaneous networks, and controversies, among other subsections. Unlike the encyclopedia format, which finalizes information on a historic figure, the schema understands knowledge as an ongoing quest, especially in the realm of underrepresented women. Instead of historical data about women being relegated to a handful of written pages––where it risks being lost, yet again, in the traditional historical narrative––users step inside the data, into a new dimension of learning and knowing historical women. A searchable digital archive connects modern women with their mostly unknown foremothers who were female groundbreakers of the past.

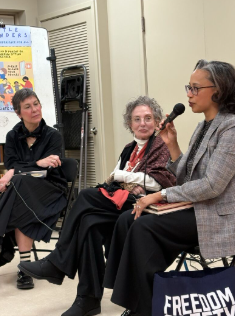
Lisa Metcalfe, Gina Luria Walker, and TracyAnn Williams at a 2025 New Historia Salon.

==== The New Historia Salons and Events ====
To celebrate their 2017 launch, The New Historia held a panel discussion at The New School, featuring Refinery 29's Amy Emmerich and Activist Nell Merlino. The event also featured Nancy Kendrick, a Professor of Philosophy at Wheaton College, Mary Spongberg, Dean of Arts and Social Sciences and Professor of History at the University of Technology Sydney, Australia, and Julie Dam, a content/brand consultant and novelist. "It is imperative that we galvanize what we know so that women's legacy is acknowledged as essential to the continuum of human enlightenment. Activating what we know will also keep us from making contemporary women invisible — waiting to be brought to life 50 or 100 years from now," stated Walker for the online announcement. The event was titled "Anonymous No More: Recovering Women from the Past to Change Our Future."

In coordination with The New Historia's website launch, Walker held an event called "The City of Ladies" at the New School in 2022. In October 2023, The New Historia hosted an event at The New School to discuss Shakespeare Was a Woman and Other Heresies, a book by writer and New Historia contributor Elizabeth Winkler. In February 2024, The New Historia hosted an in-person event at the Strand Bookstore in New York City, featuring writer and historian Barbara Savage, who discussed her book Merze Tate: The Global Odyssey of a Black Woman Scholar. Savage was joined by New Historia contributors Gina Luria Walker, Nancy Kendrick, and Namita Luthra.

The New Historia collaborated with the University of Edinburgh and the Institut Français d'Ecosse in October 2024 on "Missing Matter," a "series of conferences discussing feminist historiography." It was organized by Prof. Gina Luria Walker, Dr. Séverine Genieys-Kirk, head of French and Francophone Studies at The University of Edinburgh, and Dr. Carme Font-Paz, Associate Professor of English Literature at Universitat Autònoma de Barcelona, Spain, and Research Associate at the UCLA Center for Medieval and Renaissance Studies.

Gina Luria Walker and The New Historia Chair Lisa Metcalfe launched a series of Salons in Rhinebeck, New York, to further spread The New Historia's message and philosophy. Commencing in 2025, the Salons facilitate conversations with acclaimed feminist historians, authors, editors, and creatives. Past topics have included feminist musical composition, women in medical education, and the life of Toni Morrison. The New Historia Salons are ongoing.

In March 2026, The New Historia gathered for "Finding Mary Shelley" at Upstate Films in Rhinebeck, New York, for an evening of film, scholarship, and conversation dedicated to Mary Shelley - the author whose creation became legend. The event brought together experts on Frankenstein's author, Mary Shelley. Only a teenager when the iconic monster tale was written, Shelley — and women in general — are often overlooked in the many film adaptations of the story. Area experts presented clips from Guillermo del Toro's Frankenstein (2025) and discussed where Mary Shelley is (and isn't) in the film.

=== Women and textiles ===
Looking for unrecognized ways women created and produced knowledge and influence outside the traditional narrative, Walker studies the history of women and textiles. Textile production has historically been a trade associated with women. Walker researches women's global influence in the textile trade from the Bronze Age through the medieval period. By examining these textiles, she uncovers the "text" embedded within the work. From these "texts," the lives and work of invisible female artisans is revealed, and history is better represented through their intricacies. Walker spoke at the Talking Textiles Conference in 2020, highlighting the role of textiles in feminist historical recovery.

== Professorial and Educational Work ==
Gina Luria Walker served as Assistant Director of the Program on Women at Northwestern University. The Program was established in 1973 and focused "on the causes, concomitants and consequences of present alterations in sex roles and sex stereotypes and [exploring] the implications of these changes for personal, social, and institutional adjustment."

As Professor of Women's Studies at The New School for Social Research and Schools of Public Engagement (1993-2025), Walker taught undergraduate and graduate courses rooted in women's intellectual history and feminist historical recovery. Walker taught classes including "Becoming Visible," "Female Biography, Novels, Memoirs: Are Women's Truths in Their 'Fictions'?" and "Revolutionary Women" during her 32-year Professorship at The New School.

During her career at The New School, Walker participated in programming, online content, and panels. For instance, she was featured in the 2020 "The Women's Legacy Project" series on YouTube, a video program that shares the stories of underrepresented women, produced by The New School. In 2013, the Vera List Center hosted a conference organized by Carin Kuoni, Director of The Vera List Center for Art and Politics at The New School, and Gina Luria Walker called "Toward a More Perfect History for the 21st Century." The discussion "analyzes the impulse to risk self-writing, features women's self-representation over time in letters, journals, novels, and other genres, and examines how self-writing has functioned as a vehicle for mentoring, instruction, and inspiration for women." Walker was also a panelist at the 2015 event "Emma at 200: Feminist Style," hosted by The New School, which celebrated the 200th anniversary of Jane Austen's Emma. In 2025, Walker's accomplishments in feminist historical recovery were celebrated at "Becoming Visible, Staying Visible: 50 Years of Taking a Stand with Dr. Gina Luria Walker," hosted by The New School at Wollmann Hall. The event's speakers included Walker's colleagues, academic collaborators, and students.

=== Pedagogy ===
Gina Luria Walker's progressive pedagogical approach acknowledges that women "have always been deliberately left out of the established cultures of teaching, learning, and new knowledge production." Diverging from traditionally male-centered Western academia, Walker has students recontextualize and reinterpret women's epistemological authority through feminist historical recovery— directly engaging with primary, secondary, and archival materials. Walker's "Becoming Visible" course gave students the "opportunity to translate empirical research into various media, beginning with multi-disciplinary data that provides evidence of individual women and their accomplishments from the past, and to experiment with the norms and forms of the making of History itself."

A proponent of broadening feminist-historical interpretations through nontraditional means, creative projects play a role in Walker's pedagogy. Given the freedom to formulate, design, and present independent assignments, Walker's students have submitted nonlinear interactive narratives, interpretations of the gendered writing system Nüshu, and feminist familial accounts, among others. The "Emerging Voices" section of The New Historia website showcases projects created under Walker's guidance.

=== New Initiatives ===
In 2025, Walker designed a middle school curriculum in Social Studies that included new information about historical women erased, misappropriated, and from conventional History courses for New York City public schools. Using the accessible model of The New Historia's knowledge-ordering system, adapted to fit children's needs, the curriculum immerses 6th graders in the narratives of underrepresented women. The curriculum invites students to challenge male-centric interpretations by using activities and resources that encourage them to draw on their experiences and observations of their community to better understand trailblazing female figures in history.

== Personal life ==
=== Childhood ===
Walker was born in Brooklyn, New York. Her mother, Zyra Miller Lourie, was among a group of progressive teachers who founded the Brooklyn Community School (later, The Woodward School), which Walker attended from kindergarten to the 8th grade, and later taught first grade in 1979. Walker's father, Samuel Victor Lourie, taught English in the New York City vocational schools, received a doctorate in Remedial Reading, and became the Director of the Reading Institute at NYU.

=== Marriage and Family Life ===
In the 1970s, Walker took a 20-year break from academia to address her "harrowing domestic situation." During this period, Walker "never forgot what [she] had learned from Hays and Wollstonecraft, and the other women and generous men around them, about the potential for the regeneration of the human condition." She ultimately took an adjunct position at The New School.

Gina Luria Walker has one son and married Chauncey Walker, a lawyer, in 1989, and welcomed three stepsons and their families.

=== Advocacy and Views ===
Walker has consistently advocated for women's inclusion in academic spaces and access to new knowledge systems, challenging male-dominated interpretations of teaching and learning that have historically excluded women. Walker believes in restructuring human history beyond simply including women in preexisting narratives. Her advocacy involves reassessing masculinist perspectives and recognizing how cultural institutions have influenced idiosyncratic, frequently nonlinear forms of women's learning and expression. Walker's work highlights women who have been erased, ignored, understudied, stigmatized, or censored in the past, to make a more accurate, inclusive, and optimistic account of the evolution of human culture.

In 2018, Walker spoke at Temple University about her own #MeToo experience. As a doctoral student, Walker "seriously considered having sex with a distinguished older male scholar, who, in return, offered [her] the academic equivalents of stardom: publication by prestigious presses, paid speaking engagements, maybe even an appointment at an elite university." As a young woman in a male-dominated field, Walker knew that earning laurels without male assistance would be difficult. However, she repeatedly denied the scholar's request and was ultimately shunned by his proteges. After hearing stories from other women and haunted by her experience, Walker chose to investigate "the shadowy, earlier female figures whose lives, too, required idiosyncratic strategies to combat the abuses of sexual difference."

== Books and publication history ==
=== As author ===
- Everywoman (with Virginia Tiger, edited by Toni Morrison, Random House, 1976, 1978). Lushly illustrated with woman-centric collages, Walker's groundbreaking 1976 book Everywoman lies at the intersection of history and trope—reexamining and rewriting the "adventurer, childbearer, warrior, [and] bitch."
- Mary Hays: The Growth of a Woman's Mind (Ashgate, 2006, reissued by Routledge in 2018); ISBN 978-0-7546-4061-5. Walker's multifaceted 2006 book examines Mary Hays through "historical, biographical, literary, critical, theological, and political" perspectives to better understand the figure's innovative role within female biography. Walker, who deems Hays an 18th-century feminist, argues Hays "has been waiting two hundred years to be judged in a fair, scholarly, and comprehensive way."
- Rational Passions: Women and Scholarship in Britain, 1702–1870, A Reader (with Felicia Gordon, University of Toronto Press, 2008); ISBN 978-1-55111-643-3. The Glasgow Women's Library described Rational Passions as a "masterful collection of female scholarship from 1702-1870 [...] which shows the expansion of women's writing into wider and wider non-fictional areas. It shows their communication with and opposition to the contemporary masculine hegemony of scholarship and their influence on each other." The 2008 anthology focuses solely on the nonfiction works of British women, introducing readers to lesser-known writers such as Priscilla Wakefield and Jane Marcet.

=== As editor ===
- The Feminist Controversy in England: 1788–1810 (1974, Garland Publishing Company). Eighty-nine volumes edited by Gina Luria and initially published in the 1790s. Features Luria's introductions to work by Mary Hays, Maria Edgeworth, Mary Ann Radcliffe, and Catherine Macaulay. Feminist literary critic Elaine Showalter described Feminist Controversy as providing "a lively intellectual context for the most famous feminist work of the eighteenth century."
- William Godwin's Memoirs of the Author of A Vindication of the Rights of Woman (as editor with Pamela Clemit, Broadview Press, 2001); ISBN 978-1-55111-259-6
- The Idea of Being Free: A Mary Hays Reader (as editor, Broadview Press, 2006); ISBN 978-1-55111-559-7. Carefully curated by a foremost scholar on the autodidact writer Mary Hays, Gina Luria Walker sheds light on the lesser-known pieces of Hays's canon. The Idea of Being Free weaves together Hays's letters, nonfiction writing, essays, life writing, and political commentary to emphasize the influence and individual intelligence of a trailblazing historical woman.
- Chawton House Library Edition of Mary Hays's Female Biography; or Memoirs of Illustrious and Celebrated Women, of All Ages and Countries, 6 vols. (as editor, Pickering & Chatto, 2013, 2014. Published in 2016 by Routledge in the "Memoirs of Women Writers" series); ISBN 978-1848936003. Walker's landmark contemporary edition of Mary Hays's Female Biography chronicles the lives of 302 women across six volumes. To realize this massive undertaking, Walker assembled 164 scholars, establishing the Female Biography Project (FBP) as an international collaborative movement to reconsider and revitalize Hays's pioneering work.
- The Invention of the Female Biography (With Mary Spongberg, Routledge, 2018); ISBN 978-1-351-26517-1
- Mary Hays's 'Female Biography': Collective Biography as Enlightenment Feminism (with Mary Spongberg, Routledge, 2019); ISBN 978-0-367-17869-7

=== Scholarly Contributions ===
- "Sewing in the Next World: Mary Hays as Dissenting Autodidact in the 1780s," Romanticism on the Net, Number 25 (2002)
- "Mary Hays's 'Love Letters,'" Keats-Shelley Journal Vol. 51 (2002)
- "'Can Man Be Free/And Woman Be a Slave?' Teaching Eighteenth- and Nineteenth-Century Women Writers in Intersecting Communities," Teaching British Women Writers 1750–1900, (2005)
- "Energetic Sympathies Of Truth And Feeling: Mary Hays And Rational Dissent" in "Intellectual Exchanges: Women and Rational Dissent," a special issue of Enlightenment and Dissent (2011)
- "Women's Voices," Cambridge Companion to British Literature of the French Revolution in the 1790s (2011)
- "The Two Marys: Hays Writes Wollstonecraft," Called To Civil Existence (2014, Brill).
- "The Invention of Female Biography," Enlightenment and Dissent, (2014)
- "Recovering Frieda Wunderlich: Gender, Knowledge, and Exile." Social Research: An International Quarterly Vol. 84 (with Ellen Freeberg and Lara-Zuzan Golesorkhi, Johns Hopkins University Press, 2017).
- "I Sought & Made to Myself an Extraordinary Destiny", Women's Writing, Volume 25, Issue 2 (2018, Routledge)
- "Female Biography and the Digital Turn," Feminist Histories and Digital Media (Gina Luria Walker, Mary Spongberg, and Koren Whipp, 2019, Routledge)
- "Women's History: Galvanizing Marginality," The Future of Enlightenment (2019, Hermann).

== Interviews and Online Features ==
- "Pride, Prejudice, Patriarchy: Jane Austen reads Mary Hays," Chawton House Library Fellow's Lecture (University of Southampton, 2010)
- "18 Badass Women You Probably Didn't Hear About in 2014," Buzzfeed (Rossalyn Warren, 2014)
- "The Two Marys: Hays Writes Wollstonecraft," Romantic Circles (Gina Luria Walker, 2014)
- "The Sexism of Wikipedia," The Atlantic (Emma Paling, 2015)
- "Snatching History's Forgotten Women from the Evil Clutches of the Patriarchy," The Atlantic (Emma Paling, 2016)
- "The New Historia Offers Innovative Ways to Navigate History" (The New School, 2018)
- "It's 2019. Women Are Still Less Likely To Be Identified By Their Accomplishments," Huffpost (Monica Torres, 2019).
- "100 Years of Power, Part 2: Slow Burn of Progress," The Story Exchange (Victoria Flexner and Colleen DeBaise, 2020)
- "Founding Mothers: Meet the Ten Women Who Helped Build The New School," The New School, (2020).
- "Clara Mayer: An Overlooked Pillar of The New School | Women's Legacy Project" The New School (dir. Cecilia Rubino, 2020)
- "A Refuge for Scholars: The Women Behind the University in Exile | Women's Legacy Project" The New School (dir. Cecilia Rubino, 2020).
- "Bernice Abbott: Bringing Photography to The New School | Women's Legacy Project" The New School (dir. Cecilia Rubino, 2020)
- "Unbound" podcast episode 2 with Gina Luria Walker, January 2021. Women's Legacy at The New School collection, NS-02-25-01. The New School Archives
- "Taking Up the Cause: Mary Hays's Female Biography," The Women's Print History Project (Amanda Law, 2021).
- "Where are the Women in Eternity?" Lecture by Gina Luria Walker for Chau Chak Wing Museum/AWAWS, 2021.
- Volumes 8-10 of Memoirs of Women Writers, Routledge's "History of Feminism" online database.
- "Interview with Gina Luria Walker and The New Historia," 12th Street Journal, (Riley Dole, 2022)

== Reviews in Scholarly Journals ==
- Review of Wendy Gunther-Canada's Rebel Writer: Mary Wollstonecraft and Enlightenment Politics (American Political Science Review, Cambridge University Press, 2002).
- Review of E.J. Clery's The Feminization Debate in Eighteenth-Century England: Literature, Commerce and Luxury, (Wordsworth Circle Vol. 37 Issue 4, 2006).
- Reviews of Jennie Batchelor and Cora Kaplan's Women and Material Culture 1660-1830 and Carolyn Steedman's Master and Servant: Love and Labour in the English Industrial Age (Wordsworth Circle Vol. 38 No. 4, 2007).
- Review of Christina de Bellaigue's Educating Women: Schooling and Identity in England and France, 1800–1867, (Journal of British Studies, Oxford University Press, 2009).
- Review of Julia Prewitt Brown's The Bourgeois Interior: How the Middle Class Imagines Itself in Literature and Film (Wordsworth Circle Vol. 39 Issue 4, 2008).
- Reviews of Devoney Looser's Women Writers and Old Age in Great Britain 1750-1850, Helen Small's The Long Life, and Cheryl A Wilson's Byron: Heritage and Legacy (Wordsworth Circle Vol. 40 Issue 4, 2009).
- Reviews of Julia V. Douthwaite's The Frankenstein of 1790 and Other Lost Chapters from Revolutionary France and Katherine Astbury's Narrative Responses to the Trauma of the French Revolution (European Romantic Review, Vol. 25 Issue 4, 2014).

== References to and Reviews of Gina Luria Walker's Work ==
- Elaine Showalter, "Review of The Feminist Controversy in England, 1788-1810" (Signs Vol. 3 No. 4, University of Chicago, 1978).
- Mary Jeanette Moran, "Review of Mary Hays (1759-1843): The Growth of a Woman's Mind" (Journal of British Studies, Vol. 47 Issue 1, 2008).
- Mary Waters, "Review of Mary Hays (1759-1843): The Growth of a Woman's Mind, by G. L. Walker" (Eighteenth-Century Studies, 42(1), 177–179, 2008).
- "Review of Mary Hays (1759-1843): The Growth of a Woman's Mind, by G. L. Walker" (Women's Writing, Vol. 15 No. 1, 2008).
- Koren Whipp, "The Female Biography Project" (The Female Spectator Vol. 15 No. 3, 2011).
- 'Jessica S,' "Review of Rational Passions: Women and Scholarship in Britain 1702-1870: A Reader edited by Felicia Gordon and Gina Luria Walker" (Glasgow Women's Library, 2017).
- "Visualizing the Feminist Controversy in England, 1788-1810", (DH2018 Mexico City, 2018).
- Sarah Hutton, 9780367178697/E9103FC97E29D5040D547360DD7D6562 "Review of Mary Hays's 'Female Biography': Collective Biography as Enlightenment Feminism Mary Spongberg and Gina Luria Walker (editors)", (Hypatia Vol. 36 Issue 4, 2019).
- Dana A Williams' Toni at Random: The Iconic Writer's Legendary Editorship (Amistad, 2025); ISBN 0063011972. Williams mentions Walker and Tiger's collaboration with Morrison (editor) on the 1976 book Everywoman.
