= The Victim of Prejudice =

1799 novel by Mary Hays

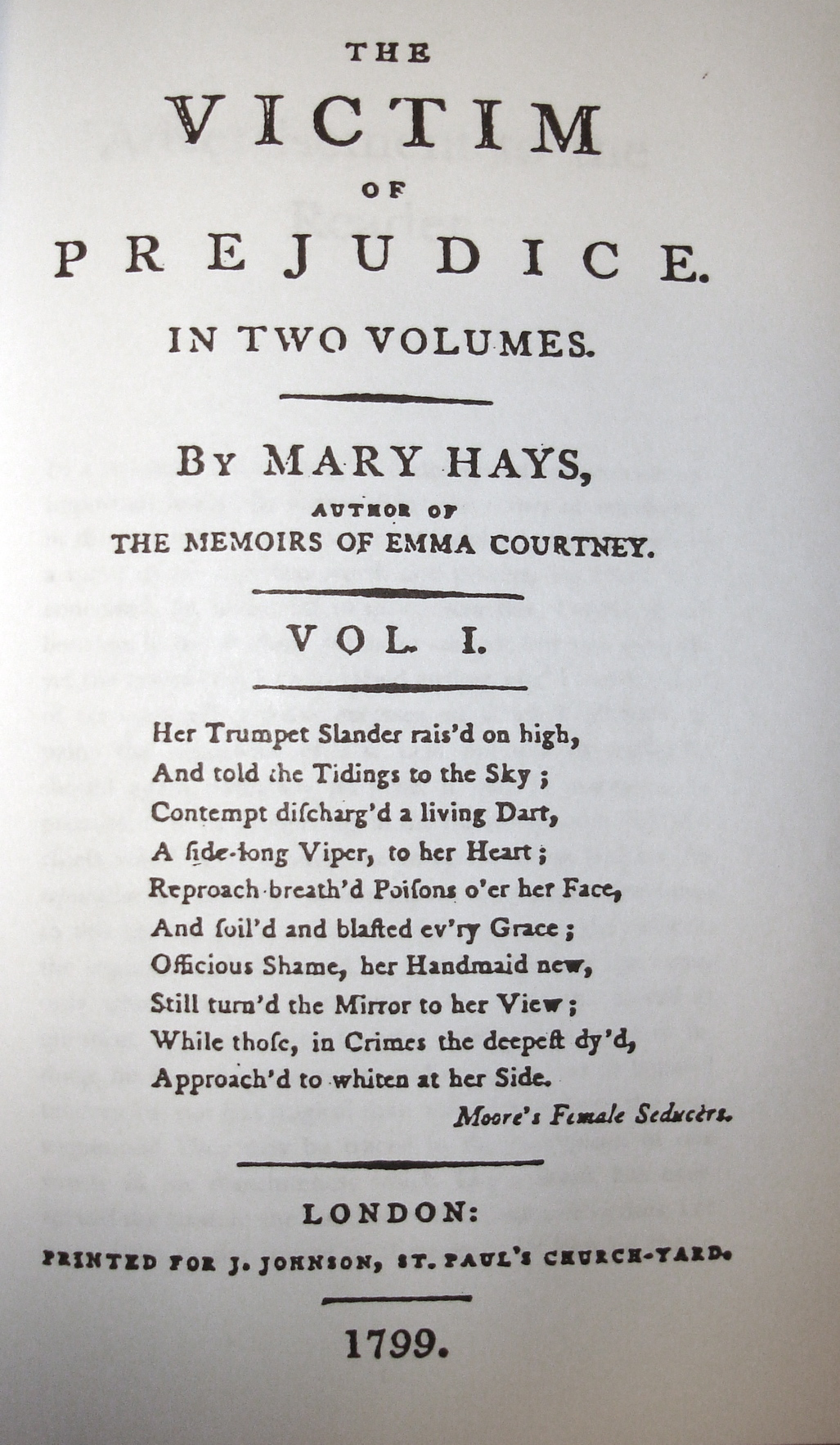
- Author: Mary Hays
- Language: English
- Genre: Novel
- Publication date: 1799
- Publication place: United Kingdom
- OCLC: 41278546
- Dewey Decimal: 823/.7 21
- LC Class: PR4769.H6 V5
- Preceded by: Memoirs of Emma Courtney

The Victim of Prejudice was published in 1799 and is the second novel written by author Mary Hays. The novel’s main character is Mary Raymond and follows her throughout her life to show the trials and tribulations that she is forced to face because of her “rank” in society. Not only because she is the illegitimate child of a prostitute and murderer, but also because she is a woman. She is taken in and kept safe by Mr. Raymond on his estate, but that could only last for so long. As she ventures from the Edenic safety of the estate and as she grows older, Mary seems to be haunted by Sir Peter Osborne who continuously appears in her life at her most vulnerable moments. Osborne eventually rapes Mary, but regardless of his violation, Mary maintains that her “virtue” is in her mind and not her body. Whatever she believed personally, she ultimately comes to see how the social structures and laws that surrounded her dictated her “virtue” and her fate from the moment she was born.

The Victim of Prejudice grapples with an assortment of social and political issues that women faced in England in the 18th century and was extremely controversial because it vividly showed the reality for many women who could not find a traditional place in society. The controversy wasn’t just for depicting reality, but also because of the focus the novel puts on the role that man-made laws played in creating these political and social issues for women at the time. After Mary is ‘brutally violated’, she has no recourse, legal or otherwise and Osborne is free to carry on existing without any consequences. She can’t even make him pay in the court of public opinion because his status as a male landowner and society's prejudice against women will lead to them taking his side in a ‘he said she said’ situation. The novel is meant to be a reflection of a stark reality in the hopes of promoting change. While many of the legal frameworks around sexual violence have changed in the last 200+ years, many of the prejudices, both legal and social, remain; That might be why Hays’ writing is still seen as relevant to feminist discourse today. Mary Hays’ thinking was incredibly ahead of her time and she was an early outspoken proponent for feminist ideals, such as recognizing the moral and rational qualities of women, creating jobs for women without money, and a better education system for women and girls.

== Plot summary ==
The novel opens with the narrator Mary Raymond writing an account of her life from prison with a plea for God's mercy and for the reader to acknowledge her position as an innocent victim of misfortune.

The story begins with her childhood. She is an orphan being raised by Mr. Raymond, a tutor, in a country village in the county of Monmouthshire. She leads a happy and healthy childhood doing things like bareback horse riding, tree climbing, wrestling other children, and dancing. Her guardian also provides her the same robust education that he provides to the boys he tutors, which she enjoys and excels at.

When she is eleven, Mr. Raymond is hired by his friend Mr. Pelham to tutor two boys, William and Edmund. Mary quickly becomes fond of William, and William uses her affections to convince her to steal grapes for him from the garden of the neighbor Sir Peter Osborne. While in the garden she is found and grabbed by Sir Osborne who insists he must kiss her in exchange for the fruit. Mary escapes before he can follow through on the threat. He later does follow through when he forcibly kisses her after she and Willam protect a rabbit from his hunting party, only letting her go when William uses the whip against him.

The Pelham boys and Mary continue their education and close friendship until Mary is seventeen at which Mr. Raymond tells Mary he is sending her away since now she is older must relinquish her fondness for William and be separated from him because the two could never marry due to the gap in their social positions. He insists that William will become "man of the world" and will find connection with Mary humiliating. Mary is devastated by the idea of separation but agrees to obey her guardian's wishes.

Mr. Raymond takes her to live with his friend Mr. Neville and his wife Mrs. Neville in their home by the coast. One day she stands by the sea lost in thought and does not notice when the tide rises until she finds herself trapped in the water. She is rescued and when she realizes that Sir Osborne is her rescuer, she is terrified and begs him not to feel entitled to treat her with "insult" and allow her to the Neville home in peace, which he does.

Weeks later, William visits Mary. He declares his love for her and that he would never agree to marry anyone but her. He becomes offended when Mary explains why her guardian separated them.Mary writes a letter to Mr. Raymond stating that she loves William but will renounce him if she deems it the virtuous thing to do.

Mary then receives a letter from Mr. Raymond explaining the story of her mother, whom Mr. Raymond had once proposed marriage to. She declined and fell in love with another man instead, and Mr. Raymond went on a foreign tour. Five years later he saw her, looking haggard, with a ruffian at the scene of a stabbing murder in a tavern of dubious reputation. She and the ruffian were arrested for the murder. From prison she wrote a letter to Mr. Raymond described how his rival had, through her inexperience and naivete, seduced her, leading to her bearing a baby girl. She then, out of desperation, turned to selling her body to support herself and became the accomplice to the murder. She asked Mr. Raymond to care for her daughter, which he accepted. Mary struggles to come to terms with this information. William tries to comfort her but Mary is inconsolable realizing that she could only bring William social disgrace if he married her. He insists he still wants to marry her. He then leaves for London and is eventually sent to the continent by his father.

Soon after, the Nevilles receive word that the rector that Mr. Neville served as a curate under and who has provided their housing has died, and that the Nevilles must leave their cottage within a week. Sir Osborn has taken possession of the rectory and its properties. The Nevilles move and have lost their source of income, and Mary returns to Mr. Raymond. She feels responsible for the predicament of the Nevilles and asks her guardian to help them. He tells her that the only way he can assist them would be to give them her inheritance, meaning she would have to work to support herself after his death. Mary agrees to these terms.

Later, Mary receives an offer of marriage from a neighboring farmer. She declines, not wanting to marry anyone but William. Mr. Raymond tells her she is being foolish in turning down future security for a man who is being exposed to corruptions of the world. Mary becomes perturbed by the idea that William has likely been unfaithful to her while on his travels.

Mr. Raymond dies, leaving Mary only a letter of introduction for a position assisting in managing the home of a friend and his wife in London. After mourning her guardian she prepares to leave, but two days before she departs Mr. Osborne approaches her, beginning to offer his protection to her now that she is alone. Mary stops him and tells him to leave. She also receives a letter from William announcing that become engaged to another woman, which emotionally devastates her.

Mary travels to London and arrives at her destination, only to find the job offer was a ruse when Osborne enters her room that night. He says he had to trick her to get her to come due to her naivete and affections for William and again offers her protection and control of the house. Mary declines, and Osborne has her locked away in a back-chamber of the house.

Mary eventually takes the key from the maid attending to her and begins to escape until she gets caught on the stairway by a drunken Osborne and he assaults her. After it is over, she demands on being let go. He tells her that her reputation will be ruined and she now has no prospects in society, while she maintains that she did nothing wrong and her virtue cannot be stolen from her in this manner. Osborn, angry, relents and tells her to leave.

Mary, feeling ill from her ordeal, immediately encounters William. He notices her haggard condition and she explains what has happened. He brings her to a nearby hotel to recover for three weeks while she suffers flashbacks of the assault and recalls the fate of her mother. When she has regained herself, William suggests that she become his mistress and allow him to provide for her. She refuses, saying "it is virtue only that I love better than William Pelham". He calls her destiny "severe" and gives her a ten-pound note.

The next morning she writes him a note and finds an apartment to live in. She meets with the landlady, who ask if she has lived anywhere else in London. Mary recounts again what has happened since her arrival in the city, and the landlady offers the service of her husband in seeking legal redress, but warns that her case would be difficult to prove in court. While living in this apartment, Mary takes on credit for clothing and other immediate necessities, having left her belongings behind at Osborne's. The landlady contacts Mr. Pelham for verification of Mary's story. Mr. Pelham accuses Mary of attempting to seduce William, and she gets evicted from the apartment.

On her own and in debt, Mary works for a while drawing plants at a print shop. One day, her employer makes an advance on her while she works, citing Osborne and William Pelham. Mary runs away from the shop and realizes that the story of her time at Osborne's has gotten out and her reputation is indeed altered. She fails to get any more artistic work and turns her attention to attempting to get domestic work. She nearly obtains a paid companionship position with a young lady about to travel, then gets rejected at the last moment.

Unable to work and in debt, Mary is arrested and taken to be detained in the house of a sheriff's officer. When she says that there is no one to give her bail, the officer tells her there is someone willing to bail her out. She is terrified to discover it is Osborne and declares she would rather go to prison. He claims love for her and regret for his actions, saying that he will give her a future and affluence, an offer she vehemently refuses and he leaves her to the processes of the law.

She is taken to prison and is visited by Mr. Raymond's former servant James, who had in the past acted in opposition to Osborne. He offers to take on her debt and work it off, but she turns down his offer. When he asks she tells him what has happened to her and James is outraged, becoming the only one to affirm Mary's innocence. He secures her freedom and reveals that he has started a small farm on land rented from Sir Osborne. She moves back into her childhood home and works keeping records for James' farm.

Six months later, Mary is in the village after getting a loan from the bank for the farm, she encounters Osborne and his hunting party again while she is caring for an injured child, and he prevents her from stumbling in shock. His companions get water for her and they leave. Osborne sends her letters, which she ignores.

James dies, leaving Mary yet again alone, and Osborne again approaches her. He offers his condolences for her loss and offers her marriage, which she once again refuses, telling him to leave her to her fate. He tells her the next morning he will be leaving to take a months-long voyage to the western islands and hopes by his return she will reconsider.

Mary is again arrested for the debt she incurred for the farm, which she had forgotten about. Unable to pay it, she is placed in county jail. Her creditor refuses to excuse the debt, expecting Osborne to pay it for her upon his return. She spends four months in prison before she declares she can write no more. The novel concludes two years into her incarceration. The Nevilles come to her prison and announce her freedom. They take her to their home, promising to help her repair her reputation, but she struggles with her health. After a year, Mr. Neville becomes ill and dies. Not long afterwards, Mrs. Neville becomes ill as well and Mary attends her deathbed. Mrs. Neville requests that her body be buried with her husband and laments that Mary will not survive her friends by long, as the injustice Mary has suffered has had too ill an effect on her health. Mrs. Neville dies and Mary is left completely alone.

== Historical background ==
Victim of Prejudice was written in conversation with or inspired by several other writers. One was Edmund Burke and his Reflections on the Revolution in France (1790). Burke argued that the chaos of the French Revolution would only be avoided by English "benevolent patriarch's". Hays, in turn, created the character of Peter Osborne, an antithesis of this patriarchal ideal. Additionally, Hays has several allusions to Samuel Richardson's Clarissa (1748), another novel about the rape of a middle-class woman. Hays' novel seeks to have a more bodily protagonist than the “paragon” in Clarissa.

Mary Hays was a friend and disciple of writer and philosopher Mary Wollstonecraft. Following Wollstonecraft's death and William Godwin's biography of her, Memoirs of the Author of A Vindication of the Rights of Woman (1798), Mary Hays attracted scrutiny and criticism from many male authors. Her first novel, Memoirs of Emma Courtney (1796) focused on female sexuality and desire, its been suggested it was an autobiographical account of her romantic interest in William Frend. Hays was ridiculed widely by the mainstream male intelligentsia for both her novel and association with Wollstonecraft, inspiring much of the work of cataloguing injustice in Victim of Prejudice.

Victim of Prejudice and Memoirs of Emma Courtney were both written during the upheaval of the French Revolution. Where Courtney is said to lean into the revolutionary role that female desire can have on class politics, Victim of Prejudice has a more tragic tone. Some authors have suggested that this was a response to "the Terror" and bloodshed of the French Revolution, to which Hays' writing responded. Hays instead sought to show the need for change without directly advocating for revolution, opting to show the damage that practical reform has on certain lives.

== Characters ==
=== Mary ===
The protagonist of the novel. As a daughter of a “fallen woman”, Mary was sent to live under the care of Mr. Raymond. It was here that she was raised in a kind and loving environment. She was taught to value education and knowledge, which led to a natural sense of curiosity that maintained well into her adulthood. Mary also holds a firm and unwavering resolve. Aside from her education, she also values her own integrity. Something that is constantly challenged throughout the novel. Despite the many hardships Mary undergoes, she never once lost her own sense of value and self-respect. Even in the face of a society that looks down on her after her assault.

=== Mr. Raymond ===
Mary’s guardian and teacher. Mr. Raymond owns an estate a fair distance from the city of London. He is known amongst many as a man of knowledge and wisdom. This reputation allows him to foster and educate children of high-standing families, such as William and Edmund Pelham. Mr. Raymond took Mary in at the wishes of Mary’s mother, hoping to spare her the fate that she has to suffer. Knowing what society is like and how cruel Mary’s mother was treated, Mr. Raymond took it upon himself to teach Mary everything he could, in the hopes that she would live a much better life. This was also the reason why he warned Mary to not be William’s wife, as William would have treated Mary poorly as a spouse.

=== William Pelham ===
One of the sons of Mr. Pelham, and brother to Edmund. William was sent to study under Mr. Raymond along with his brother. He was also a friend and a primary love interest of Mary when they were both young. William grows up to use his family reputation to indulge in his own pleasures. These pleasures are traveling and women. He firmly believes that virtue is a made-up thing, and there is no real reason to pursue or maintain it. This viewpoint gives William a paradoxical view of Mary’s assault and ultimately leaves him unable to do anything to help his friend.

=== Sir Peter Osborne ===
The main antagonist of the novel. A landowner and a highly respected man in the London Area. Osborn is a man of money and status. He uses both to maintain his standing and to do whatever he wishes. Often using underhanded and manipulative means to do so. Much like how he attempted to persuade Mary to let him be her benefactor, as a means of escaping the fate of being an unchastised woman.

=== Mary’s Mother (Mary) ===
Once a well-mannered lady who fell victim to the love and tenderness of an unnamed man. She was blinded by love and a sense of false hope from her lover, which ultimately made her lose her chastity to the man. Upon discovering the man has abandoned her, Mary is soon branded as an adulterer, leaving her family no choice but to forsake her. Being trained as a lady, Mary did not have any skills that would allow her to make a living. At some point, Mary gave birth to her daughter and named her Mary after herself. Wishing for her daughter to avoid her fate, Mary brought her to Mr. Raymond so he could be her guardian.

=== Mr. Neville ===
A good friend of Mr. Raymond and husband to Mrs. Neville, who hosts Mary during her late teens. Described as a well-mannered and intelligent man. Both him and his family lives within very reasonable means. Comfortable, but not by any means of high class. He is also the one to get Mary out of the debtor’s prison and takes her in. Mr. Osborne prosecutes Mr. Neville for helping Mary, but she helps out the Neville family with her small inheritance.

=== Mrs. Neville ===
Mr. Neville's wife is dedicated to her husband and loves her family. She cares for Mary in her illness after her release from the debtor’s prison.

== Themes ==
=== Prejudice ===
Social prejudice is a central theme of The Victim of Prejudice. Throughout the novel, Mary Raymond is introduced to and found violating 18th-century English social norms, specifically regarding chastity and gender identities. Hays uses Mary’s narrative as a means to explicitly condemn social prejudices surrounding women and chastity.

As a well-educated, beautiful young woman, Mary Raymond is posed as someone who has all the assets to become a functioning and respected member of society. This narrative begins to shift for her when Mr. Raymond makes her aware of her own love for William. Scholar Brittany Barron argues that this moment marks the shift from Mary’s idyllic childhood seclusion to her entrance into a patriarchal society. While becoming William’s wife would set Mary up for a legitimate life, this is denied to her due to the circumstances of her birth. It is at this moment that Mary learns that she not only bears the prejudice against illegitimate children but also the inherited prejudices against her mother.

Osborne’s rape of Mary and his subsequent lies about the encounter help to moralize Hays’ underlying argument. Through the victimization of Mary, Hays is able to make the argument that “too-great stress [is] laid on the reputation for chastity in woman” without challenging the belief that chastity is a “most important branch of temperance”. Hays balances the opposing perspectives of chastity and instead of putting them at war with one another, she allows them to be in conversation with one another and gives the floor to the idea of women dictating their own perspectives about their bodies and chastity instead. As Scholar Marilyn L. Brooks posits, “conventionally, a breach of chastity was seen as the bringer of calamity, whereas Hays locates this calamity within the idea of chastity itself”.

Osborne makes it clear he knows society is prejudiced against Mary as she is a poor woman, and for his being a rich man. This power dynamic also allows Osborne to plant additional seeds of prejudice against Mary.

Mary must reckon with social prejudice at every turn as it causes her to lose the social and economic capital she needs to live a happy life. As scholars have noted, even Mr. Raymond, who disavows prejudice to Mary, encourages in her a “rational submission to prejudice … of class and gender,” both factors which contribute to Mary’s troubled existence.

Throughout the novel, Mary pushes back against the strict ideals of chastity and innocence that define the society around her, but she is ultimately exhausted by them and ends the novel longing to escape prejudice through death- “In death, Mary discards society's labels.”. It is through Mary and her war with various prejudices that Hays argues for a reconsideration of many social conventions, where she ends with a plea for men to recognize the “barbarous penalties” imposed on women as the result of prejudice.

=== Women’s autonomy ===
Women’s autonomy, or lack thereof, is another crucial theme of The Victim of Prejudice. This lack of autonomy expands to love, money, the law, and as some scholars argue, the mind.

Throughout The Victim of Prejudice, Mary consistently asserts her desire to be an autonomous, fully functioning member of society, wanting to “seek, by honest labour, the bread of independence”. While her education under Mr. Raymond set her up to cultivate valued skills and knowledge that could be lucrative in society, she is constantly met with barriers to this goal, and it ultimately proves to be unattainable.

As indicated, Mary begins her life well-educated by Mr. Raymond, which some scholars argue exacerbates Mary’s lack of freedom, reflecting the reality of many educated women of the time, whose “education [was] liberalized while they [were] effectively constrained”. Through her education, Mary is given all of the resources to support an autonomous life that is out of her reach.

Mary’s autonomy is taken away from birth by her mother’s social status. As the illegitimate offspring of a prostitute and murderer she is not free to marry who she chooses, nor is she allowed to enter honestly into society without facing bouts of prejudice. Her identity as a woman in 18th-century England is a further hindrance, with patriarchal systems that would limit her independence even if her birth had been legitimate.

Osbourne’s rape of Mary is not only a literal violation of Mary’s autonomy at the hands of the patriarchy but also representative of women’s subservient position in a society that views them “as property”. Mary’s subsequent struggle to find legitimate employment further restricts her autonomy. “As Hays observed in her Letters and Essays, ‘young women without fortunes, if they do not chance to marry have scarce any other resource than in servitude or prostitution’”. Mary is unable even to seek any legal recompense against Osbourne due to her subservient position in society. In the novel, Mary laments “difficulties almost insuperable, difficulties peculiar to my sex, my age, and my unfortunate situation”.

While Mary has sections of the novel —such as her childhood with Mr. Raymond, where she enjoys greater freedom, as scholar Sandra Sherman puts it, “From Hays's ironic perspective, women's approach to autonomy is circular”. Under the patriarchy, Mary must rely on men to liberate herself from standards and violence imposed by men, and as the system is contradictory and truly only ever caters to men, Mary is unable to achieve legitimate autonomy. These varied constraints on Mary’s autonomy ultimately control her identity, and scholar Eleanor Ty proposes the idea that Mary is unable to play any part other than “a victim”.

=== Reason vs passion ===
Yet another common theme in The Victim of Prejudice is the idea of reason and its existence in opposition to passion. This has also been interpreted by some scholars as the separation of mind and body, with reason being mind and passion being body. To this point, scholars suggest that “this dualism is often gendered and hierarchized so that women are associated with the body, while men are linked to the mind or reason" (Ty qtd. in Barron).

Some scholars argue that the boundaries of reason are in and of themselves patriarchal in this novel, “constituted by ideology premised on female subjection”. Sandra Sherman writes that in The Victim of Prejudice, “‘Reason’ is a mirage, reproducing male-engendered norms that seem ‘natural’”. Mary is set up as a contradiction to these norms of labeling as she is taught to reason by Mr Raymond and “trusts his wisdom above her own, acquiescing to … conventions that subordinate her based on her sex”.

Mary’s first introduction to this separation comes when Mr. Raymond reveals to her that her relationship with William is no longer considered appropriate. He implores her “to triumph over the imperious demands of passion, to yield only to the dictates of right reason and truth”. She consistently makes the effort to maintain this in her own life, but after being raped, she discovers that society will not grant her an association with reason. Knowing that she has had no intentions of compromising her chastity, Mary reasons that virtue exists in her mind, rather than in her body. However, as a woman, she is reduced by society to her body and therefore finds herself associated with passion over reason. On the final page of the novel, Mary declares that “the powers of my mind [have been] wasted”.

=== Cyclical trauma ===
One of the primary components of The Victim of Prejudice is the idea of trauma and the seemingly cyclical, fate-like way it impacts women, especially in a patriarchal-centered society. Most significantly, Hays depicts this and details this in a discussion about what may be termed, the plight of the perpetually damned.

When it comes to Mary, there is a foreboding sense of danger regarding her sexuality that persists from the Introduction of the novel and is seen during the theft of grapes and in every encounter with Sir Peter Osborne and is further spotlighted by the spotty inclusion of Mary’s mother’s story. For instance, after she has been sexually assaulted, Mary has a vision of her mother who had an experience similar to Mary’s. Mary’s sexual assault is not the first occurrence of a sexual attack in her family history. In this vision, there is an indication that it was inevitable that Mary would replicate her mother’s fate, at least to some extent in that she was almost destined to be sexually assaulted because it had happened to her mother. In the vision, it is said “She seemed to urge me to take example from her fate! Her dying groans and reiterated warnings, in low, tremulous accents, continued to vibrate on my ear.” With this Hays expands on the idea of the cyclical nature of trauma when it is suggested that Mary will reinvent the cycle, “I recovered, as from a frightful dream, to recollection and sanity”.

On this, scholar Clayton Carlyle Tarr notes that when it comes to discussing sexuality and femininity, particularly with sexual assault, The Victim of Prejudice is a key piece of literature when it comes to discourse about women and sex. This is especially true and prominent within the context of works from the 18th century and how that literature continues to influence the modern day. Tarr in particular dictates that due to the explicit nature of the rape scene in this novel, it was made possible that, “rape legislation transformed what was considered a crime against a patriarchal property into an assault on a woman’s subjectivity”. As this relates to the theme of cyclical trauma, the concept of this piece of literature being revolutionary to feminist literature of the 18th century in its depiction of sex and sexuality, there is further evidence on the whole of the impact and necessity of breaking out of cycles of trauma and abuse, and inaccurate or subdued depictions of sexual assaults.

=== Constructions of innocence ===
Throughout Mary Hays’ “The Victim of Prejudice,” the protagonist, Mary, struggles with the concept of innocence and its connection to her chastity. Mary exists within a society that equates chastity with innocence, and thus, individual worth. Growing up unaware of the societal customs of the rest of the world, Mary does not have to come to terms with the reality of her innocence until much later in her life. After being raped by Sir Peter Osborne, Mary must grapple with the difference between her chastity and her innocence. Throughout the novel, she maintains that the two are not synonymous and works to prove to society that she remains innocent despite losing her virtue. Although she remains firm in this position, the society around her is not quite as accepting of this mindset. She has to grapple with the fact that she has lost her innocence in the eyes of those around her, first, due to her mother's position in society, and secondly, due to her rape. Despite these things, Mary insists that her innocence belongs to her alone and the prejudices of society cannot rob her of her innocence nor can they equate it with her chastity. She ultimately must find comfort in her own definition of innocence and accept the inability of society to come to the same conclusion.

=== Sexual violence and the body ===
Mary’s mother and her both become the victim of men who use and view them as “sexual beings”. In both situations the women’s bodies are used against them and then react intentionally to their abusers. The older Mary claims that, upon seeing the man who impregnated her, “A thousand poignant emotions rushed upon my soul,” and later in the novel when the younger Mary faces escapes her captor, Peter Osborne, she finds that “convulsive shiverings… ran upon my nerves”. In both examples of bodily resistance and autonomy to social situations Hays’ depicts characters as neither wholly good or wholly bad. Hays’ was uninterested in earlier depictions of fallen women because they weren’t “’consistent with truth and fact’”. Ty claims that after her rape “Mary Raymond longs to be free of her sexuality” drawing connections between social actions and bodily consequences.
