= Mary Hays =

English writer and intellectual

- Born: 4 May 1759; London
- Died: 20 February 1843 (aged 83); London
- Occupations: writer, feminist
- Known for: compiling and editing Female Biography

Mary Hays (1759–1843) was an autodidact intellectual who published essays, poetry, novels and several works on famous (and infamous) women. She is remembered for her early feminism, and her close relations to dissenting and radical thinkers of her time including Robert Robinson, Mary Wollstonecraft, William Godwin and William Frend. She was born in 1759, into a family of Protestant dissenters who rejected the practices of the Church of England (the established church). Hays was described by those who disliked her as 'the baldest disciple of [Mary] Wollstonecraft' by The Anti Jacobin Magazine, attacked as an 'unsex'd female' by clergyman Robert Polwhele, and provoked controversy through her long life with her rebellious writings. When Hays's fiancé John Eccles died on the eve of their marriage, Hays expected to die of grief herself. But this apparent tragedy meant that she escaped an ordinary future as wife and mother, remaining unmarried. She seized the chance to make a career for herself in the larger world as a writer.

Hays was influenced by Mary Wollstonecraft's A Vindication of the Rights of Woman, and after writing admiringly to her, the two women became friends. The backlash following Wollstonecraft's death and posthumous publication of her Memoirs impacted Hays' later work, which some scholars have called more conservative. Among these later productions is the six-volume compendium Female Biography: or Memoirs of Illustrious and Celebrated Women of All Ages and Countries, in which Wollstonecraft is not mentioned, although Hays had written an extensive obituary for The Annual Necrology shortly after Godwin's controversial Memoirs. If Wollstonecraft was neglected through the nineteenth century, Hays and her writing received even less critical evaluation or academic attention until the twentieth-century's emerging feminist movement.

== Early years ==
Mary Hays was born in Southwark, London 4 May 1759, the daughter of Rational Dissenters John and Elizabeth Hays. They lived in Southwark, London, on Gainsford Street. Her father died young, leaving Hays an annuity of £70 a year, as long as she did not marry without her mother's approval. Hays' early education is shaped by poetry, novels, and religious and political debates at the Dissenting meeting house.

In 1777, she met and fell in love with John Eccles. Their parents opposed the match, but they met secretly and exchanged many letters between 1779 and 1780. In August 1780, just after Eccles received a job which would allow him to marry Hays, Eccles died of a sudden fever. He left Hays all his papers, including the letters she had sent him. Hay's first book, not published in her lifetime, was based on these letters, re-copied and editorialized into a semi-autobiographical epistolary novel. Hays wrote: "All my pleasures – and every opening prospect are buried with him".

After a year in mourning, Hays dedicated herself to an intellectual life of writing. Her first published poem, "Invocation to a Nightingale," appeared in the Lady's Poetical Magazine in 1781. Subsequent early publications in periodical include two poems in 1785, and a short story, "Hermit: an Oriental Tale," published in 1786 and reprinted twice. It was a picturesque tale that warned against feeling too much passion.

From 1782 to 1790, Hays met and exchanged letters with Robert Robinson, a minister who campaigned against the slave trade. She attended the dissenting academy in Hackney in the late 1780s.

== Success in writing ==
In 1791 she replied to Gilbert Wakefield's critique of communal worship with a pamphlet called Cursory Remarks on An Enquiry into the Expediency and Propriety of Public or Social Worship, using the nom-de-plume Eusebia. The Cambridge mathematician William Frend wrote to her enthusiastically about it. This blossomed into a brief romance.

In 1792 Hays was given a copy of A Vindication of the Rights of Woman by Mary Wollstonecraft, and it made a deep impression on her. Hays contacted the publisher of the book, Joseph Johnson, which led to her friendship with Wollstonecraft and involvement with London's Jacobin intellectual circle. Hays next wrote a book Letters and Essays (1793) and invited Mary Wollstonecraft to comment on it before publication. Although the reviews were mixed Hays decided to leave home and to try to support herself by writing. She moved to Hatton Garden. She did not have enough money to buy Enquiry Concerning Political Justice by William Godwin. Boldly she wrote to the author and asked to borrow it. This turned into a friendship, in which Godwin became a guide and teacher. She acted on Wollstonecraft's demand that women take charge of their lives and moved out of her mother's home to live as an independent woman in London. This was an extraordinary and unaccustomed act for a single woman in Hays's time: Hays's mother was horrified, and Hays's friends condemned her. Although Hays's family were outsiders from mainstream British culture, Hays's mother still disapproved of her daughter's social rebellion.

== Emma Courtney ==
Her next work, Memoirs of Emma Courtney (1796) is probably her best-known. Hays's experiment with 'the idea of being free', and her romantic heartbreak over the Frend affair, were its subjects.

The novel draws on love letters to William Frend (who was ultimately unreceptive) and includes material taken also from her more philosophical letters in which she debated with William Godwin. The heroine, Emma, falls in love with Augustus Harley, who is the son of a dear friend, but lacking an income. Recognizing that he cannot afford marriage, she offers to live with him as his wife without getting married. Emma tells the Frend figure that her desire for him trumps every other consideration: reputation, status, and even chastity. In the most notorious statement in the book, Emma plays on Frend's name: ‘My friend’, she cries, ‘I would give myself to you – the gift is not worthless’. In real life and in the novel, Frend rejected Hays.

Readers were shocked at her inclusion of real letters she had exchanged with Godwin and Frend. Hays's disgrace was juicy gossip in the close-knit group of London publishing. In 1800 Scottish writer Elizabeth Hamilton published Memoirs of Modern Philosophers, a novel that satirised Hays as a sex-hungry man-chaser, and Hays became a laughingstock throughout Britain.

== Later years ==
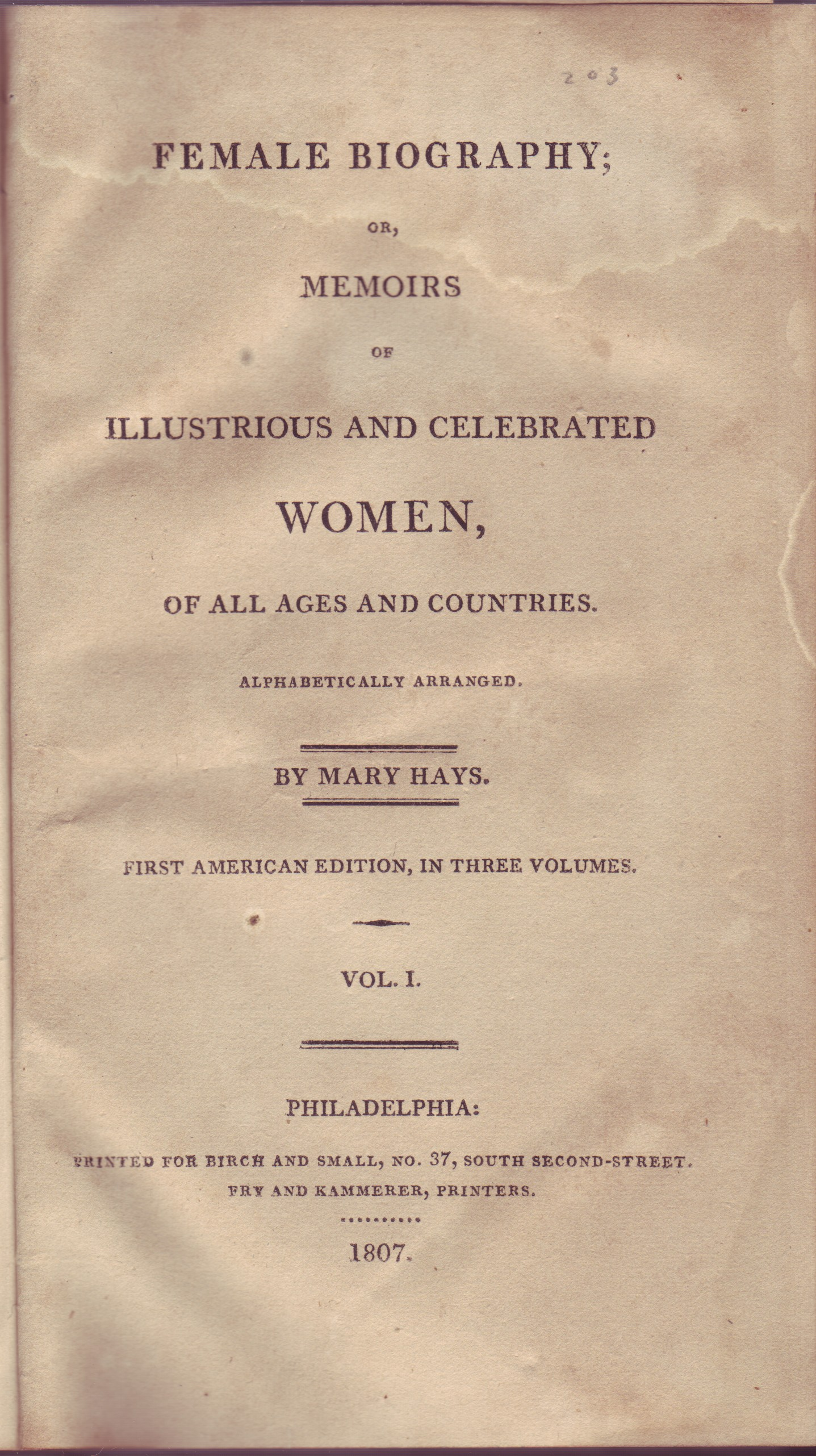
Title page of Female Biography, or, Memoirs of Illustrious and Celebrated Women (first American edition, 1807)

Hays and Godwin fell out, and she turned her attention to other writers, including Robert Southey and unfortunately Charles Lloyd. There is no known portrait of her in later life, but Samuel Taylor Coleridge referred to her as "a thing ugly and petticoated" (although his real complaint was her arguing theology with him). Her next novel The Victim of Prejudice (1799) is more emphatically feminist in its focus on women's secondary status and criticism of class hierarchies. Hays was considered too radical and her book did not sell well. In 1803 Hays demonstrated her continuing concern with women's lives and work, publishing Female Biography, a book in six volumes, containing the lives of 294 women from ancient figures to near contemporaries. Some scholars have argued that by this stage Hays realised that it was dangerous to praise Mary Wollstonecraft, and so omitted her from the book. Others have argued that Hays had little to lose and did not include Wollstonecraft for other reasons—her stated reason that she was too recently dead, and because she had already written and published a full obituary that should perhaps be considered part of Female Biography.

Moving to Camberwell in 1804 thanks to the income from Female Biography, Hays became known to more literary figures of the time, including Charles and Mary Lamb and William Blake. The last 20 years of her life were difficult, with little income and only moderate praise for her work. During this period, she published Memoirs of Queens, Illustrious and Celebrated (1821). In 1824 Hays returned to London where she died on 20 February 1843. She is buried at Abney Park Cemetery, Church Street, Stoke Newington, London.

== Legacy ==
Mary Hays is memorialised in the Heritage Floor of Judy Chicago's The Dinner Party, near the place setting for Mary Wollstonecraft. Her letters are held at the New York Public Library, Astor and Tilden Foundation thanks to the work of Dr. Gina Luria Walker.

== List of works ==
All by Mary Hays; dates are for first editions.

- Cursory remarks on an enquiry into the expediency and propriety of public or social worship: inscribed to Gilbert Wakefield (as Eusebia). London: Knott, 1791.
- Letters and essays, moral, and miscellaneous. London: Knott, 1793.
- Memoirs of Emma Courtney (2 volumes). London: G.G. & J. Robinson, 1796.
- Appeal to the men of Great Britain in behalf of women (as Anonymous). London: J. Johnson and J. Bell, 1798.
- The victim of prejudice: In two volumes. London: J. Johnson, 1799.
- Female Biography, or Memoirs of Illustrious and Celebrated Women of All Ages and Countries (6 volumes). London: R. Phillips, 1803.
- Harry Clinton: a tale for youth. London: J. Johnson, 1804.
- Historical Dialogues for young persons (3 volumes). London: J. Johnson, 1806 [-1808].
- Family annals, or, The sisters. London: W. Simpkin & R. Marshall, 1817.
- Memoirs of Queens, illustrious and celebrated. London: T. & J. Allman, 1821.
- The Love-Letters of Mary Hays (1779–1780). Ed. A.F. Wedd. London: Methuen, 1925. Posthumous.
