= Lisa Strausfeld =

American information architect

- Born: 1964 or 1965 (age 60–61); New Jersey
- Education: Massachusetts Institute of Technology; Harvard University; Brown University
- Occupation: Data visualization
- Children: 1

Lisa Strausfeld (born 1964 or 1965) is an American design professional and information architect.

== Education ==
Strausfeld studied art history and computer science and earned a Bachelor of Arts at Brown University. She went on to study at Harvard University, where she earned a Master of Architecture. She later studied media arts and sciences at Massachusetts Institute of Technology (MIT), earning a Master of Science degree.

== Career ==
In 1996, Strausfeld and two MIT classmates launched Perspecta, a software company in San Francisco that made visual user-interfaces for large databases. It was sold to Excite@Home in 1999. After the sale of the company, Strausfeld joined Quokka Sports, staying until the company folded in the early 2000s. In 2002 Strausfeld joined design firm Pentagram (see below for details).

In 2006, while still at Pentagram, Strausfeld was hired as a Senior Scientist of the Gallup Organization, and worked there until she left to establish Major League Politics (MLP) in 2011, and subsequently left MLP a year later to head up Bloomberg's data visualization efforts. In 2015, Strausfeld returned to the Gallup Organization, serving as Acting Global Creative Director until 2017, when she took a position with The New School as a Senior Research Fellow until 2020.

While at The New School, Strausfeld worked with Glowbox, a design studio in Portland, Oregon, to develop a virtual reality prototype that displays a three-dimensional timeline of women's history, based on The New Historia, a women's history project by Gina Luria Walker in 2018.

Strausfeld also worked with architecture firms Ennead Architects and Diller Scofidio + Renfro, the arts group Creative Time, Brown University, Columbia Business School, New York’s redeveloped Moynihan Station, and the information visualizations for The New York Times during her career.

Strausfeld now serves as the Vice President of design of System, Inc. She is also the founder of Informationart, where she serves as an information architect, data visualization entrepreneur and principal.

=== Pentagram ===
In 2002, Strausfeld became a partner in the New York office of Pentagram, the distinguished international design consultancy. At Pentagram, Strausfeld and her team specialized in digital information projects, including the design of large-scale media installations, software prototypes and user interfaces, signage and websites for a broad range of civic, cultural and corporate clients. Shortly after joining, Strausfeld collaborated with partner Paula Scher on the identities and information installations for the corporate headquarters of Bloomberg and the Brooklyn Botanic Garden.

In 2005, Strausfeld worked with Andrew Blauvelt on the creation of a 60-foot dynamic marquee for Walker Expanded, an innovative new graphic identity that uses font creation technology to generate branding applications from business cards to environmental-scale graphics at the Walker Art Center in Minneapolis. The marquee was projected onto the building's etched glass wall along Hennepin Avenue.

In 2006, Strausfeld and James Nick Sears created "Rewiring the Spy" for The New York Times Magazine—an applet written in Processing that illustrated the connections between the names of suspected terrorists and terrorist events. During that same year, Strausfeld volunteered her contribution to the design of Sugar, the award-winning interface of One Laptop per Child. In the years following her work on Sugar, Strausfeld worked with others at Pentagram on "The Art of Dining", intended to get visitors to pay attention to the museum’s neglected tableware collection, at the Detroit Institute of Arts, which was part of a merit award given by the Society for Experiential Graphic Design. In 2010, Strausfeld worked on an interactive media installation for the Museum of Arts and Design in New York in an aim to revolutionize data visualization.

Straufeld left Pentagram in March 2011.

== Awards ==
Strausfeld was honored for Interaction Design in the 2010 National Design Awards presented by Cooper-Hewitt, Smithsonian Design Museum; she was a finalist for the award in 2009, the first year the discipline was recognized by the awards. She was named one of BusinessWeek’s “Cutting Edge Designers” in 2007, and Sugar and the Times visualizations were both featured in the Museum of Modern Art exhibition "Design and the Elastic Mind" in 2008. Fast Company featured her as one of its 2009 Masters of Design. She has received six awards in the prestigious International Design Excellence Awards (IDEA), co-sponsored by the Industrial Designers Society of America (IDSA), and her projects have been honored by the Art Directors Club, the Type Directors Club, the AIGA and the Society for Environmental Graphic Design.

== Selected publications ==
- Strausfeld, Lisa. "Financial Viewpoints: using point-of-view to enable understanding of information." Conference companion on Human factors in computing systems. ACM, 1995.
- Rennison, Earl, and Lisa Strausfeld. "The Millennium Project: Constructing a dynamic 3+ D virtual environment for exploring geographically, temporally and categorically organized historical information." Spatial Information Theory A Theoretical Basis for GIS. Springer Berlin Heidelberg, 1995. 69–91.

== Patents ==
- Horowitz, D. M., Rennison, E. F., Ruffles, J. W., & Strausfeld, L. S. (2000). U.S. Patent No. 6,122,647. Washington, DC: U.S. Patent and Trademark Office.
- Horowitz, Damon M., Earl F. Rennison, and Lisa S. Strausfeld. "Immersive movement-based interaction with large complex information structures." U.S. Patent No. 6,154,213. 28 Nov. 2000.

== Personal life ==
Strausfeld was born in central New Jersey. She has a daughter named Muriel, named for her mentor, Muriel Cooper.
