= A Vindication of the Rights of Woman =

1792 feminist essay by Mary Wollstonecraft

A Vindication of the Rights of Woman: with Strictures on Political and Moral Subjects
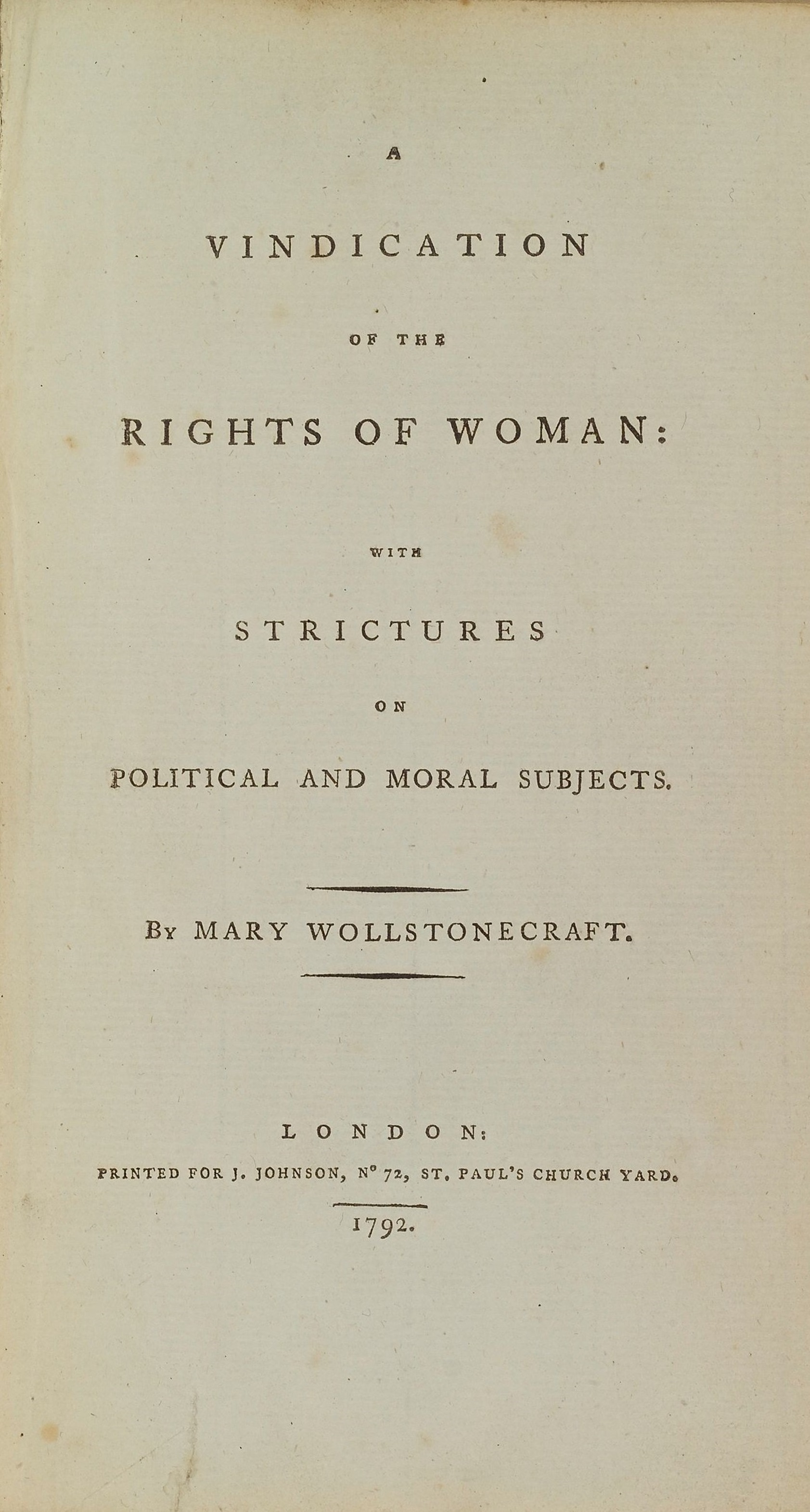
- First edition title page
- Author: Mary Wollstonecraft
- Language: English
- Subject: Women's rights
- Genre: Political philosophy
- Publication date: January 1792
- Publication place: United Kingdom
- Text: A Vindication of the Rights of Woman: with Strictures on Political and Moral Subjects at Wikisource

A Vindication of the Rights of Woman: with Strictures on Political and Moral Subjects is a 1792 essay by British philosopher and women's rights advocate Mary Wollstonecraft. It is considered a feminist or, more precisely, proto-feminist piece, and one of the pioneering works in the tradition now known as feminist philosophy.

In this essay, Wollstonecraft refutes those educational and political theorists of the eighteenth century who did not believe women should receive a full education. She argues that women ought to have an education commensurate with their position in society, claiming that women are essential to the nation because they educate its children and because they could be "companions" to their husbands, rather than mere wives. Instead of viewing women as ornaments to society or property to be traded in marriage, Wollstonecraft maintains that they are human beings deserving of the same fundamental rights as men. Wollstonecraft specifically calls for equality between the sexes in particular areas of life, especially moral responsibility and educational access. Uncertainty regarding whether she believed women should have full voting rights or other political rights make it difficult to classify Wollstonecraft definitively as a modern feminist; furthermore, the word feminist did not emerge until decades after her death.

A spiritual sequel to Wollstonecraft's A Vindication of the Rights of Men (1790), Rights of Woman was inspired after she read Charles Maurice de Talleyrand-Périgord's 1791 report to the National Assembly in revolutionary France, which stated that women should only receive a domestic education. From her reaction to this specific event, she launched a broad attack against double standards, indicting men for encouraging women to indulge in excessive emotion. Wollstonecraft hurried to complete the work in direct response to ongoing events; she intended to write a more thoughtful second volume but died before completing it.

The Rights of Woman was generally received well when it was first published in 1792. The modern assumption that it was unfavourably received is a misconception. In fact, Wollstonecraft was reviled only after details emerged of her personal life after her death, based on the publication of her husband William Godwin's Memoirs of the Author of A Vindication of the Rights of Woman (1798). Biographer Emily W. Sunstein called Rights of Woman "perhaps the most original book of [Wollstonecraft's] century". Wollstonecraft's work had a significant impact on advocates for women's rights in the nineteenth century, particularly the 1848 Seneca Falls Convention which produced the Declaration of Sentiments, laying out the aims of the women's suffrage movement in the United States.

== Historical context ==
A Vindication of the Rights of Woman was written against the tumultuous background of the French Revolution and the debates that it spawned in Britain. In a lively and sometimes vicious pamphlet war, now referred to as the Revolution controversy, British political commentators addressed topics ranging from representative government to human rights to the separation of church and state, many of these issues having been raised in France first. Wollstonecraft first entered this fray in 1790 with A Vindication of the Rights of Men, a response to Edmund Burke's Reflections on the Revolution in France (1790). In his Reflections, Burke criticized the view of many British thinkers and writers who had welcomed the early stages of the French revolution. While they saw the revolution as analogous to Britain's own Glorious Revolution in 1688, which had restricted the powers of the monarchy, Burke argued that the appropriate historical analogy was the English Civil War (1642–1651) in which Charles I had been executed in 1649. He viewed the French revolution as the violent overthrow of a legitimate government. In Reflections he argues that citizens do not have the right to revolt against their government because civilization is the result of social and political consensus; its traditions cannot be continually challenged – the result would be anarchy. One of the key arguments of Wollstonecraft's Rights of Men, published just six weeks after Burke's Reflections, is that rights cannot be based on tradition; rights, she argues, should be conferred because they are reasonable and just, regardless of their basis in tradition.

When Charles Maurice de Talleyrand-Périgord presented his Rapport sur l'instruction publique (1791) to the National Assembly in France, Wollstonecraft was galvanized to respond. In his recommendations for a national system of education, Talleyrand had written:

Let us bring up women, not to aspire to advantages which the Constitution denies them, but to know and appreciate those which it guarantees them ... Men are destined to live on the stage of the world. A public education suits them: it early places before their eyes all the scenes of life: only the proportions are different. The paternal home is better for the education of women; they have less need to learn to deal with the interests of others, than to accustom themselves to a calm and secluded life.

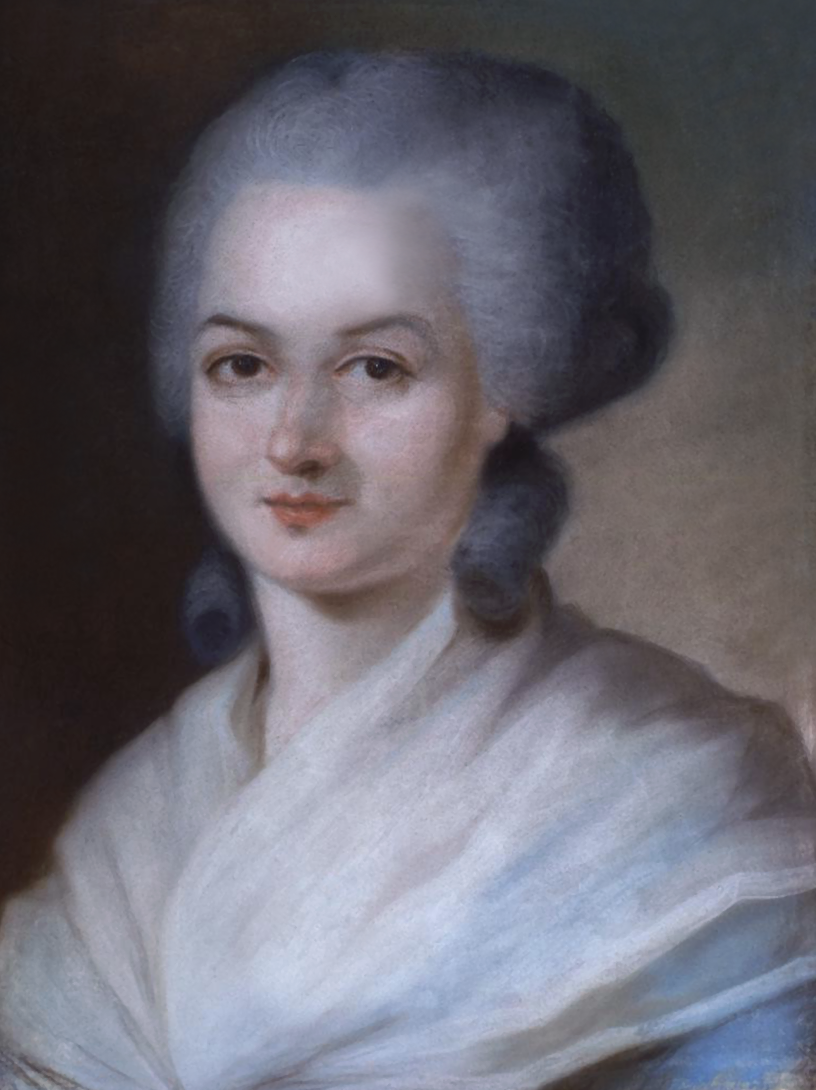
Olympe de Gouges

Wollstonecraft dedicated the Rights of Woman to Talleyrand: "Having read with great pleasure a pamphlet which you have lately published, I dedicate this volume to you; to induce you to reconsider the subject, and maturely weigh what I have advanced respecting the rights of woman and national education." At the end of 1791, French feminist Olympe de Gouges had published her Declaration of the Rights of Woman and of the Female Citizen, and the question of women's rights became central to political debates in both France and Britain.

The Rights of Woman is an extension of Wollstonecraft's arguments in the Rights of Men. In the Rights of Men, as the title suggests, she is concerned with the rights of particular men (eighteenth-century British men) while in the Rights of Woman, she is concerned with the rights afforded to "woman", an abstract category. She does not isolate her argument to eighteenth-century women or British women. The first chapter of the Rights of Woman addresses the issue of natural rights and asks who has those inalienable rights and on what grounds. She answers that since natural rights are given by God, for one segment of society to deny them to another segment is a sin. The Rights of Woman thus engages not only specific events in France and in Britain but also larger questions being raised by political philosophers such as John Locke and Jean-Jacques Rousseau.

== Themes ==
The Rights of Woman is a long (almost 87,000 words) essay that introduces all of its major topics in the opening chapters and then repeatedly returns to them, each time from a different point of view. It also adopts a hybrid tone that combines rational argument with the fervent rhetoric of sensibility. Wollstonecraft did not employ the formal argumentation or logical prose style common to eighteenth-century philosophical writing.

Hysteria was once seen as a physical phenomenon – physicians and anatomists believed that the more "sensitive" people's "nerves", the more emotionally affected they would be by their surroundings. Since women were thought to have keener nerves than men, it was believed that women were more emotional than men. The emotional excess associated with sensibility also theoretically produced an ethic of compassion: those with sensibility could easily sympathise with people in pain. Thus historians have credited the discourse of sensibility and those who promoted it with the increased humanitarian efforts, such as the movement to abolish the slave trade. But sensibility also paralysed those who had too much of it; as scholar G. J. Barker-Benfield explains, "an innate refinement of nerves was also identifiable with greater suffering, with weakness, and a susceptibility to disorder".

By the time Wollstonecraft was writing the Rights of Woman, sensibility had already been under sustained attack for a number of years. Sensibility, which had initially promised to draw individuals together through sympathy, was now viewed as "profoundly separatist"; novels, plays, and poems that employed the language of sensibility asserted individual rights, sexual freedom, and unconventional familial relationships based only upon feeling. Furthermore, as Janet Todd, another scholar of sensibility, argues, "to many in Britain the cult of sensibility seemed to have feminized the nation, given women undue prominence, and emasculated men".

=== Rational education ===
One of Wollstonecraft's central arguments in the Rights of Woman is that women should be educated in a rational manner to give them the opportunity to contribute to society. In the eighteenth century, it was often assumed by educational philosophers and conduct book writers, who wrote what one might think of as early self-help books, that women were incapable of rational or abstract thought. Women, it was believed, were too susceptible to sensibility and too fragile to be able to think clearly. Wollstonecraft, along with other female reformers such as Catharine Macaulay and Hester Chapone, maintained that women were indeed capable of rational thought and deserved to be educated. She argued this point in her own conduct book, Thoughts on the Education of Daughters (1787), in her children's book, Original Stories from Real Life (1788), as well as in the Rights of Woman.

Stating in her preface that "my main argument is built on this simple principle, that if [woman] be not prepared by education to become the companion of man, she will stop the progress of knowledge and virtue; for truth must be common to all", Wollstonecraft contends that society will degenerate without educated women, particularly because mothers are the primary educators of young children. She attributes the problem of uneducated women to men and "a false system of education, gathered from the books written on this subject by men who [consider] females rather as women than human creatures". Women are capable of rationality; it only appears that they are not, because men have refused to educate them and encouraged them to be frivolous (Wollstonecraft describes silly women as "spaniels" and "toys").

Wollstonecraft attacks conduct book writers such as James Fordyce and John Gregory as well as educational philosophers such as Jean-Jacques Rousseau who argue that a woman does not need a rational education. (Rousseau argues in Emile [1762] that women should be educated for the pleasure of men; Wollstonecraft, infuriated by this argument, attacks not only it but also Rousseau himself.) Intent on illustrating the limitations that contemporary educational theory placed upon women, Wollstonecraft writes, "taught from their infancy that beauty is woman's sceptre, the mind shapes itself to the body, and, roaming round its gilt cage, only seeks to adorn its prison", implying that without this damaging ideology, which encourages young women to focus their attention on beauty and outward accomplishments, they could achieve much more. Wives could be the rational "companions" of their husbands and even pursue careers should they so choose: "women might certainly study the art of healing, and be physicians as well as nurses. And midwifery, decency seems to allot to them ... they might, also, study politics ... Business of various kinds, they might likewise pursue."

For Wollstonecraft, "the most perfect education" is "an exercise of the understanding as is best calculated to strengthen the body and form the heart. Or, in other words, to enable the individual to attach such habits of virtue as will render it independent." In addition to her broad philosophical arguments, Wollstonecraft lays out a specific plan for national education to counter Talleyrand's. In Chapter 12, "On National Education", she proposes that children be sent to free day schools as well as given some education at home "to inspire a love of home and domestic pleasures". She also maintains that schooling should be co-educational, contending that men and women, whose marriages are "the cement of society", should be "educated after the same model".

=== Feminism ===
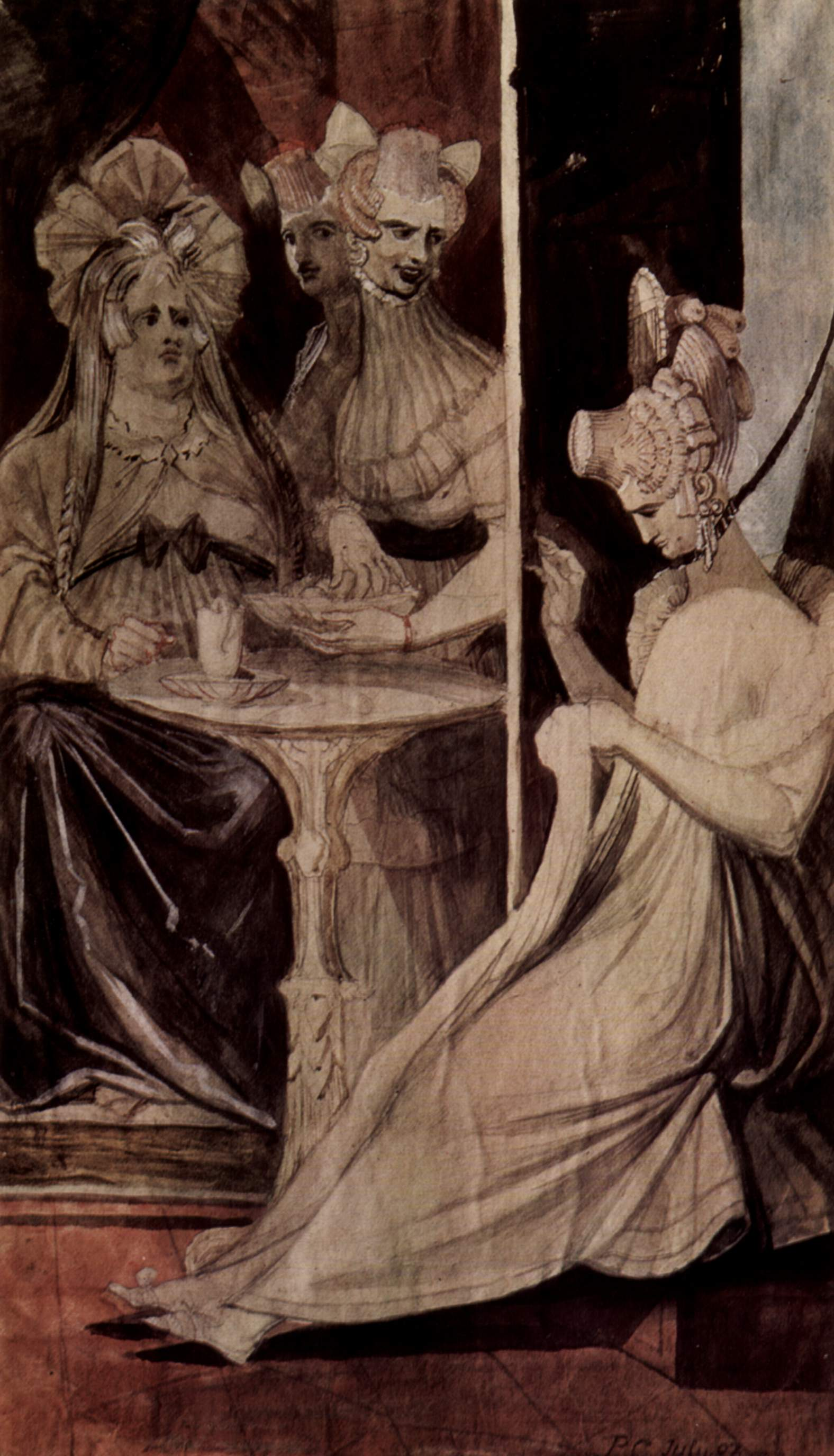
The Debutante (1807) by Henry Fuseli; "Woman, the victim of male social conventions, is tied to the wall, made to sew and guarded by governesses. The picture reflects Mary Wollstonecraft's views in The Rights of Women [sic]".

It is debatable to what extent the Rights of Woman is a feminist text; because the definitions of feminist vary, different scholars have come to different conclusions. The words feminist and feminism were not coined until the 1890s, and there was no feminist movement to speak of during Wollstonecraft's lifetime. Rights of Woman is often considered the source or original, "the ur-document of modern liberal feminism". In the introduction to her work on Wollstonecraft's thought, Barbara Taylor writes:

Describing [Wollstonecraft's philosophy] as feminist is problematic, and I do it only after much consideration. The label is of course anachronistic ... Treating Wollstonecraft's thought as an anticipation of nineteenth and twentieth-century feminist argument has meant sacrificing or distorting some of its key elements. Leading examples of this ... have been the widespread neglect of her religious beliefs, and the misrepresentation of her as a bourgeois liberal, which together have resulted in the displacement of a religiously inspired utopian radicalism by a secular, class-partisan reformism as alien to Wollstonecraft's political project as her dream of a divinely promised age of universal happiness is to our own. Even more important however has been the imposition on Wollstonecraft of a heroic-individualist brand of politics utterly at odds with her own ethically driven case for women's emancipation. Wollstonecraft's leading ambition for women was that they should attain virtue, and it was to this end that she sought their liberation.

In the Rights of Woman, Wollstonecraft does not make the claim for gender equality using the same arguments or the same language that late nineteenth- and twentieth-century feminists later would. For instance, rather than unequivocally stating that men and women are equal, Wollstonecraft contends that men and women are equal in the eyes of God, which means that they are both subject to the same moral law. For Wollstonecraft, men and women are equal in the most important areas of life. While such an idea may not seem revolutionary to twenty-first-century readers, its implications were revolutionary during the eighteenth century. For example, it implied that both men and women – not just women – should be modest and respect the sanctity of marriage. Wollstonecraft's argument exposed the sexual double standard of the late eighteenth century and demanded that men adhere to the same virtues demanded of women.

However, Wollstonecraft's arguments for equality stand in contrast to her statements respecting the superiority of masculine strength and valour. Wollstonecraft states:

Let it not be concluded, that I wish to invert the order of things; I have already granted, that, from the constitution of their bodies, men seem to be designed by Providence to attain a greater degree of virtue. I speak collectively of the whole sex; but I see not the shadow of a reason to conclude that their virtues should differ in respect to their nature. In fact, how can they, if virtue has only one eternal standard? I must therefore, if I reason consequentially, as strenuously maintain that they have the same simple direction, as that there is a God.

Wollstonecraft calls on men, rather than women, to initiate the social and political changes she outlines in the Rights of Woman. Because women are uneducated, they cannot alter their own situation – men must come to their aid. Wollstonecraft writes at the end of her chapter "Of the Pernicious Effects Which Arise from the Unnatural Distinctions Established in Society":

I then would fain convince reasonable men of the importance of some of my remarks; and prevail on them to weigh dispassionately the whole tenor of my observations ... I appeal to their understandings; and, as a fellow-creature, claim, in the name of my sex, some interest in their hearts. I entreat them to assist to emancipate their companion, to make her a help meet for them! Would men but generously snap our chains, and be content with rational fellowship instead of slavish obedience, they would find us more observant daughters, more affectionate sisters, more faithful wives, more reasonable mothers – in a word, better citizens.

Wollstonecraft's last novel, Maria: or, The Wrongs of Woman (1798), the fictionalized sequel to the Rights of Woman, is usually considered her most radical feminist work.

=== Sensibility ===
One of Wollstonecraft's most scathing criticisms in the Rights of Woman is against false and excessive sensibility, particularly in women. She argues that women who succumb to sensibility are "blown about by every momentary gust of feeling"; because these women are "the prey of their senses", they cannot think rationally. Not only do they do harm to themselves but they also do harm to all of civilization: these are not women who can refine civilization – these are women who will destroy it. But reason and feeling are not independent for Wollstonecraft; rather, she believes that they should inform each other. For Wollstonecraft the passions underpin all reason. This was a theme that she would return to throughout her career, but particularly in her novels Mary: A Fiction (1788) and Maria: or, The Wrongs of Woman. For the eighteenth-century Scottish philosopher David Hume, reason is dominated by the passions. He held that passions rather than reason govern human behaviour, famously proclaiming in A Treatise of Human Nature that "Reason is, and ought only to be the slave of the passions".

As part of her argument that women should not be overly influenced by their feelings and emotions, Wollstonecraft emphasises that they should not be constrained by or made slaves to their bodies or their sexual feelings. This particular argument has led many modern feminists to suggest that Wollstonecraft intentionally avoids granting women any sexual desire. Cora Kaplan argues that the "negative and prescriptive assault on female sexuality" is a leitmotif of the Rights of Woman. For example, Wollstonecraft advises her readers to "calmly let passion subside into friendship" in the ideal companionate marriage (that is, in the ideal of a love-based marriage that was developing at the time). It would be better, she writes, when "two virtuous young people marry ... if some circumstances checked their passion". According to Wollstonecraft, "love and friendship cannot subsist in the same bosom". As Mary Poovey explains, "Wollstonecraft betrays her fear that female desire might in fact court man's lascivious and degrading attentions, that the subordinate position women have been given might even be deserved. Until women can transcend their fleshly desires and fleshly forms, they will be hostage to the body." If women are not interested in sexuality, they cannot be dominated by men. Wollstonecraft worries that women are consumed with "romantic wavering", that is, they are interested only in satisfying their lusts. Because the Rights of Woman eliminates sexuality from a woman's life, Kaplan contends, it "expresses a violent antagonism to the sexual" while at the same time "exaggerat[ing] the importance of the sensual in the everyday life of women". Wollstonecraft was so determined to wipe sexuality from her picture of the ideal woman that she ended up foregrounding it by insisting upon its absence. But as Kaplan and others have remarked, Wollstonecraft may have been forced to make this sacrifice: "it is important to remember that the notion of woman as politically enabled and independent [was] fatally linked [during the eighteenth century] to the unrestrained and vicious exercise of her sexuality."

=== Republicanism ===
Liberty Leading the People by Eugène Delacroix (1833)

Claudia Johnson, a prominent Wollstonecraft scholar, has called the Rights of Woman "a republican manifesto". Johnson contends that Wollstonecraft is hearkening back to the Commonwealth tradition of the seventeenth century and attempting to reestablish a republican ethos. In Wollstonecraft's version, there would be strong, but separate, masculine and feminine roles for citizens. According to Johnson, Wollstonecraft "denounces the collapse of proper sexual distinction as the leading feature of her age, and as the grievous consequence of sentimentality itself. The problem undermining society in her view is feminized men". If men feel free to adopt both the masculine position and the sentimental feminine position, she argues, women have no position open to them in society. Johnson therefore sees Wollstonecraft as a critic, in both the Rights of Men and the Rights of Woman, of the "masculinization of sensitivity" in such works as Edmund Burke's Reflections on the Revolution in France.

In the Rights of Woman Wollstonecraft adheres to a version of republicanism that includes a belief in the eventual overthrow of all titles, including the monarchy. She also suggests that all men and women should be represented in government. But the bulk of her "political criticism", as Chris Jones, a Wollstonecraft scholar, explains, "is couched predominantly in terms of morality". Her definition of virtue focuses on the individual's happiness rather than, for example, the good of society. This is reflected in her explanation of natural rights. Because rights ultimately proceed from God, Wollstonecraft maintains that there are duties, tied to those rights, incumbent upon each and every person. For Wollstonecraft, the individual is taught republicanism and benevolence within the family; domestic relations and familial ties are crucial to her understanding of social cohesion and patriotism.

=== Class ===
In many ways the Rights of Woman is inflected by a bourgeois view of the world, as is its direct predecessor the Rights of Men. Wollstonecraft addresses her text to the middle class, which she calls the "most natural state". She also frequently praises modesty and industry, virtues which, at the time, were associated with the middle class. From her position as a middle-class writer arguing for a middle-class ethos, Wollstonecraft also attacks the wealthy, criticizing them using the same arguments she employs against women. She points out the "false-refinement, immorality, and vanity" of the rich, calling them "weak, artificial beings, raised above the common wants and affections of their race, in a premature unnatural manner [who] undermine the very foundation of virtue, and spread corruption through the whole mass of society".

But Wollstonecraft's criticisms of the wealthy do not necessarily reflect a concomitant sympathy for the poor. For her, the poor are fortunate because they will never be trapped by the snares of wealth: "Happy is it when people have the cares of life to struggle with; for these struggles prevent their becoming a prey to enervating vices, merely from idleness!" She contends that charity has only negative consequences because, as Jones puts it, she "sees it as sustaining an unequal society while giving the appearance of virtue to the rich".

In her national plan for education, she retains class distinctions (with an exception for the intelligent), suggesting that: "After the age of nine, girls and boys, intended for domestic employments, or mechanical trades, ought to be removed to other schools, and receive instruction, in some measure appropriated to the destination of each individual ... The young people of superior abilities, or fortune, might now be taught, in another school, the dead and living languages, the elements of science, and continue the study of history and politics, on a more extensive scale, which would not exclude polite literature."

== Rhetoric and style ==
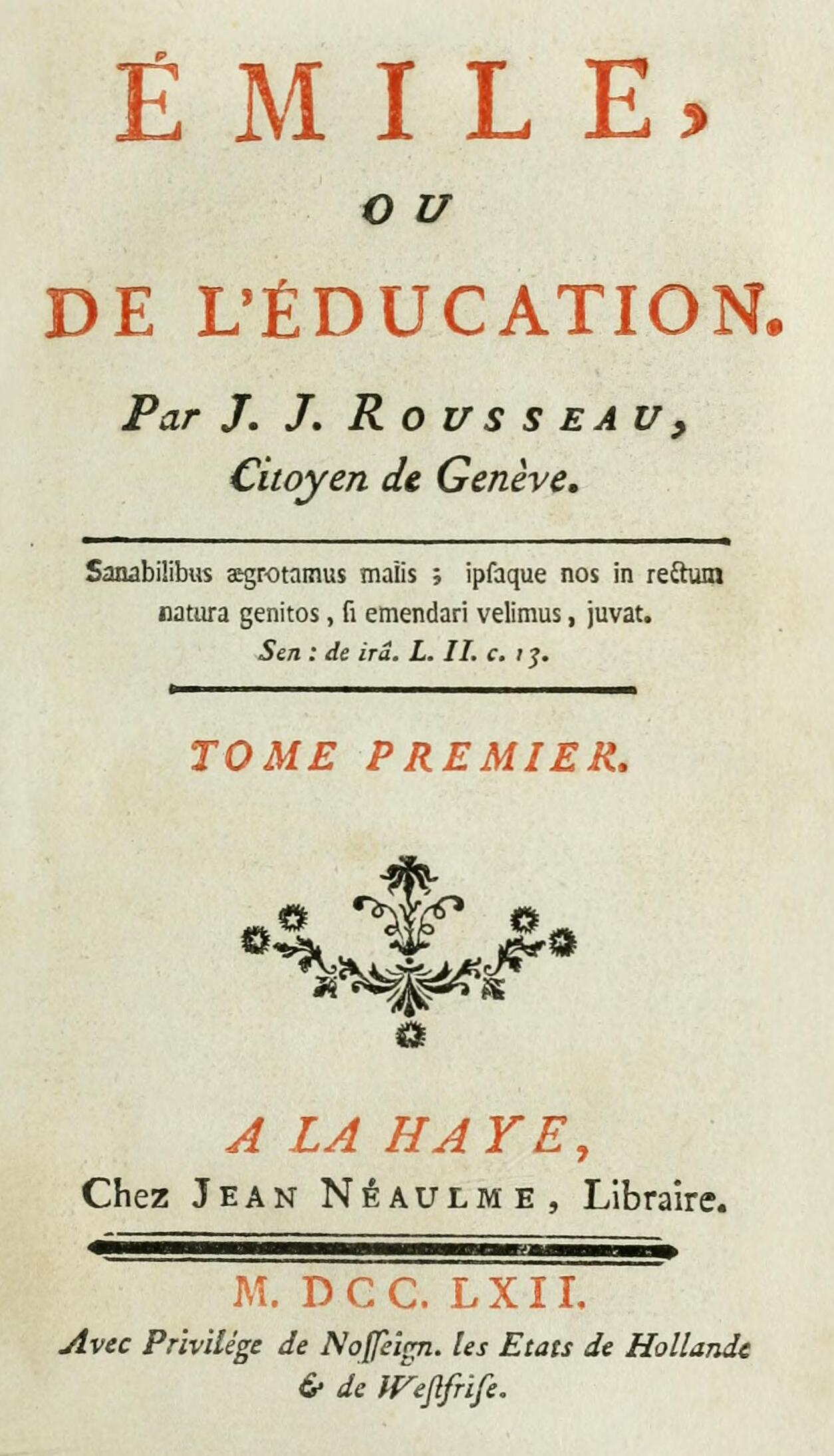
Rousseau's Emile (1762)

In attempting to navigate the cultural expectations of female writers and the generic conventions of political and philosophical discourse, Wollstonecraft, as she does throughout her oeuvre, constructs a unique blend of masculine and feminine styles in the Rights of Woman. She uses the language of philosophy, referring to her work as a "treatise" with "arguments" and "principles". However, Wollstonecraft also uses a personal tone, employing "I" and "you", dashes and exclamation marks, and autobiographical references to create a distinctly feminine voice in the text. The Rights of Woman further hybridizes its genre by weaving together elements of the conduct book, the short essay, and the novel, genres often associated with women, while at the same time claiming that these genres could be used to discuss philosophical topics such as rights.

Although Wollstonecraft argues against excessive sensibility, the rhetoric of the Rights of Woman is at times heated and attempts to provoke the reader. Many of the most emotional comments in the book are directed at Rousseau. For example, after excerpting a long passage from Emile (1762), Wollstonecraft pithily states, "I shall make no other comments on this ingenious passage, than just to observe, that it is the philosophy of lasciviousness." A mere page later, after indicting Rousseau's plan for female education, she writes "I must relieve myself by drawing another picture." These terse exclamations are meant to draw the reader to her side of the argument (it is assumed that the reader will agree with them). While she claims to write in a plain style so that her ideas will reach the broadest possible audience, she actually combines the plain, rational language of the political treatise with the poetic, passionate language of sensibility to demonstrate that one can combine rationality and sensibility in the same self.

In her efforts to vividly describe the condition of women within society, Wollstonecraft employs several different analogies. She often compares women to slaves, arguing that their ignorance and powerlessness places them in that position. But at the same time, she also compares them to "capricious tyrants" who use cunning and deceit to manipulate the men around them. At one point, she reasons that a woman can become either a slave or tyrant, which she describes as two sides of the same coin. Wollstonecraft also compares women to soldiers; like military men, they are valued only for their appearance and obedience. And like the rich, women's "softness" has "debased mankind".

== Revision ==
Wollstonecraft was forced to write the Rights of Woman hurriedly to respond to Talleyrand and ongoing events. Upon completing the work, she wrote to her friend William Roscoe: "I am dissatisfied with myself for not having done justice to the subject ... Do not suspect me of false modesty – I mean to say that had I allowed myself more time I could have written a better book, in every sense of the word ... I intend to finish the next volume before I begin to print, for it is not pleasant to have the Devil coming for the conclusion of a sheet fore it is written." When Wollstonecraft revised the Rights of Woman for the second edition, she took the opportunity not only to fix small spelling and grammar mistakes but also to bolster the feminist claims of her argument. She changed some of her statements regarding female and male difference to reflect a greater equality between the sexes.

Wollstonecraft never wrote the second part to the Rights of Woman, although William Godwin published her "Hints", which were "chiefly designed to have been incorporated in the second part of the Vindication of the Rights of Woman", in the posthumous collection of her works. However, she did begin writing the novel Maria: or, The Wrongs of Woman, which most scholars consider a fictionalized sequel to the Rights of Woman. It was unfinished at her death and also included in the Posthumous Works published by Godwin.

== Reception and legacy ==
When it was first published in 1792, the Rights of Woman was reviewed favourably by the Analytical Review, the General Magazine, the Literary Magazine, New York Magazine, and the Monthly Review, although the mistaken assumption persists that Rights of Woman received hostile reviews. It was almost immediately released in a second edition in 1792, several American editions appeared, and it was translated into French. Taylor writes that "it was an immediate success". Moreover, other writers such as Mary Hays and Mary Robinson specifically alluded to Wollstonecraft's text in their own works. Hays cited the Rights of Woman in her novel Memoirs of Emma Courtney (1796) and modelled her female characters after Wollstonecraft's ideal woman.

Although female conservatives such as Hannah More excoriated Wollstonecraft personally, they actually shared many of the same values. As the scholar Anne Mellor has shown, both More and Wollstonecraft wanted a society founded on "Christian virtues of rational benevolence, honesty, personal virtue, the fulfillment of social duty, thrift, sobriety, and hard work". During the early 1790s, many writers within British society were engaged in an intense debate regarding the position of women in society. For example, the respected poet and essayist Anna Laetitia Barbauld and Wollstonecraft sparred back and forth; Barbauld published several poems responding to Wollstonecraft's work and Wollstonecraft commented on them in footnotes to the Rights of Woman. The work also provoked outright hostility. The bluestocking Elizabeth Carter was unimpressed with the work. Thomas Taylor, the Neoplatonist translator who had been a landlord to the Wollstonecraft family in the late 1770s, swiftly wrote a satire called A Vindication of the Rights of Brutes: if women have rights, why not animals too?

After Wollstonecraft died in 1797, her husband William Godwin published his Memoirs of the Author of A Vindication of the Rights of Woman (1798). He revealed much about her private life that had previously not been known to the public: her illegitimate child, her love affairs, and her attempts at suicide. While Godwin believed he was portraying his wife with love, sincerity, and compassion, contemporary readers were shocked by Wollstonecraft's unorthodox lifestyle and she became a reviled figure. Richard Polwhele targeted her in particular in his anonymous long poem The Unsex'd Females (1798), a defensive reaction to women's literary self-assertion: Hannah More is Christ to Wollstonecraft's Satan. His poem was "well known" among the responses to A Vindication.

Wollstonecraft's ideas became associated with her life story and women writers felt that it was dangerous to mention her in their texts. Hays, who had previously been a close friend and an outspoken advocate for Wollstonecraft and her Rights of Woman, for example, did not include her in the collection of Illustrious and Celebrated Women she published in 1803. Maria Edgeworth specifically distances herself from Wollstonecraft in her novel Belinda (1802); she caricatures Wollstonecraft as a radical feminist in the character of Harriet Freke. But, like Jane Austen, she does not reject Wollstonecraft's ideas. Both Edgeworth and Austen argue that women are crucial to the development of the nation; moreover, they portray women as rational beings who should choose companionate marriage.

The negative views towards Wollstonecraft persisted for over a century. The Rights of Woman was not reprinted until the middle of the nineteenth century and it still retained an aura of ill-repute. George Eliot wrote "there is in some quarters a vague prejudice against the Rights of Woman as in some way or other a reprehensible book, but readers who go to it with this impression will be surprised to find it eminently serious, severely moral, and withal rather heavy". The suffragist (i.e. moderate reformer, as opposed to suffragette) Millicent Garrett Fawcett wrote the introduction to the centenary edition of the Rights of Woman, cleansing the memory of Wollstonecraft and claiming her as the foremother of the struggle for the vote. While the Rights of Woman may have paved the way for feminist arguments, 20th century feminists have tended to use Wollstonecraft's life story, rather than her texts, for inspiration; her unorthodox lifestyle convinced them to try new "experiments in living", as Virginia Woolf termed it in her famous essay on Wollstonecraft. However, there is some evidence that the Rights of Woman may be influencing current feminists. Ayaan Hirsi Ali, a feminist who is critical of Islam's dictates regarding women, cites the Rights of Woman in her autobiography Infidel, writing that she was "inspired by Mary Wollstonecraft, the pioneering feminist thinker who told women they had the same ability to reason as men did and deserved the same rights". Miriam Schneir also includes this text in her anthology Feminism: The Essential Historical Writings, labelling it as one of the essential feminist works. Further evidence of the enduring legacy of Wollstonecraft's A Vindication may be seen by direct references in recent historical fiction set: for example, in The Silk Weaver (1998) set in the late eighteenth century among Dublin silk weavers, author Gabrielle Warnock (1998) intervenes as narrator to hold up ‘Rights of Woman’ for the reader to reflect upon the politics, morals, and feelings of her female characters. In Death Comes to Pemberley (2011), set in 1803, P. D. James has one male character reference Rights of Woman in reproving another (Darcy) for denying voice to the woman in matters that concern her.

== See also ==
- "On the Equality of the Sexes"
- Timeline of Mary Wollstonecraft
- Mary Wollstonecraft
- Feminism
- Feminist movements and ideologies

== Bibliography ==
=== Modern reprints ===
- Wollstonecraft, Mary. The Complete Works of Mary Wollstonecraft. Ed. Janet Todd and Marilyn Butler. 7 vols. London: William Pickering, 1989. ISBN 0-8147-9225-1.
- Wollstonecraft, Mary. The Vindications: The Rights of Men and The Rights of Woman. Eds. D.L. Macdonald and Kathleen Scherf. Toronto: Broadview Literary Texts, 1997. ISBN 1-55111-088-1.
- Wollstonecraft, Mary. A Vindication of the Rights of Woman. Ed. Miriam Brody Kramnick. Rev. ed. Harmondsworth: Penguin, 2004. ISBN 0-14-144125-9.
- Wollstonecraft, Mary. A Vindication of the Rights of Woman. Ed. Deidre Shauna Lynch. 3rd ed. New York: W. W. Norton and Company, 2009. ISBN 0-393-92974-4.
- Wollstonecraft, Mary. A Vindication of the Rights of Men and A Vindication of the Rights of Woman. Ed. Sylvana Tomaselli. Cambridge: Cambridge University Press, 1995. ISBN 0-521-43633-8.

==== Contemporary reviews ====
- Analytical Review 12 (1792): 241–249; 13 (1792): 418–489.
- Christian Miscellany 1 (1792): 209–212.
- Critical Review New Series 4 (1792): 389–398; 5 (1792): 132–141.
- General Magazine and Imperial Review 6.2 (1792): 187–191.
- Literary Magazine and British Review 8 (1792); 133–139.
- Monthly Review New Series 8 (1792): 198–209.
- New Annual Register 13 (1792): 298.
- New-York Magazine 4 (1793): 77–81.
- Scots Magazine 54 (1792): 284–290.
- Sentimental and Masonic Magazine 1 (1792): 63–72.
- Town and Country Magazine 24 (1792): 279.

=== Secondary sources ===
- Barker-Benfield, G.J. The Culture of Sensibility: Sex and Society in Eighteenth-Century Britain. Chicago: University of Chicago Press, 1992. ISBN 0-226-03714-2.
- DeLucia, JoEllen. "A Vindication of the Rights of Woman". The Literary Encyclopedia, Volume 1.2.1.06: English Writing and Culture of the Romantic Period, 1789–1837, 2011.
- Gordon, Lyndall. Vindication: A Life of Mary Wollstonecraft. Great Britain: Virago, 2005. ISBN 1-84408-141-9.
- Hume, David. A Treatise of Human Nature 1. London: John Noon, 1739. Retrieved 19 May 2020.
- Janes, R.M. "On the Reception of Mary Wollstonecraft's A Vindication of the Rights of Woman". Journal of the History of Ideas 39 (1978): 293–302.
- Johnson, Claudia L. Equivocal Beings: Politics, Gender, and Sentimentality in the 1790s. Chicago: University of Chicago Press, 1995. ISBN 0-226-40184-7.
- Jones, Chris. "Mary Wollstonecraft's Vindications and their political tradition". The Cambridge Companion to Mary Wollstonecraft. Ed. Claudia L. Johnson. Cambridge: Cambridge University Press, 2002. ISBN 0-521-78952-4.
- Kaplan, Cora. "Mary Wollstonecraft's reception and legacies". The Cambridge Companion to Mary Wollstonecraft. Ed. Claudia L. Johnson. Cambridge: Cambridge University Press, 2002. ISBN 0-521-78952-4.
- Kaplan, Cora. "Pandora's Box: Subjectivity, Class and Sexuality in Socialist Feminist Criticism". Sea Changes: Essays on Culture and Feminism. London: Verso, 1986. ISBN 0-86091-151-9.
- Kaplan, Cora. "Wild Nights: Pleasure/Sexuality/Feminism". Sea Changes: Essays on Culture and Feminism. London: Verso, 1986. ISBN 0-86091-151-9.
- Kelly, Gary. Revolutionary Feminism: The Mind and Career of Mary Wollstonecraft. New York: St. Martin's, 1992. ISBN 0-312-12904-1.
- Mellor, Anne K. "Mary Wollstonecraft's A Vindication of the Rights of Woman and the women writers of her day". The Cambridge Companion to Mary Wollstonecraft. Ed. Claudia L. Johnson. Cambridge: Cambridge University Press, 2002. ISBN 0-521-78952-4.
- Pennell, Elizabeth Robins. Life of Mary Wollstonecraft. Boston: Roberts Brothers, 1884.
- Poovey, Mary. The Proper Lady and the Woman Writer: Ideology as Style in the Works of Mary Wollstonecraft, Mary Shelley and Jane Austen. Chicago: University of Chicago Press, 1984. ISBN 0-226-67528-9.
- Sapiro, Virginia. A Vindication of Political Virtue: The Political Theory of Mary Wollstonecraft. Chicago: University of Chicago Press, 1992. ISBN 0-226-73491-9.
- Sunstein, Emily W. A Different Face: The Life of Mary Wollstonecraft. New York: Harper and Row, 1975. ISBN 0-06-014201-4.
- Taylor, Barbara. Mary Wollstonecraft and the Feminist Imagination. Cambridge: Cambridge University Press, 2003. ISBN 0-521-66144-7.
- Todd, Janet. Sensibility: An introduction. London: Methuen, 1986. ISBN 0-416-37720-3.
- Wardle, Ralph M. Mary Wollstonecraft: A Critical Biography. Lincoln: University of Nebraska Press, 1951.
