= Eleanor Ty =

Filipino-Canadian literary scholar

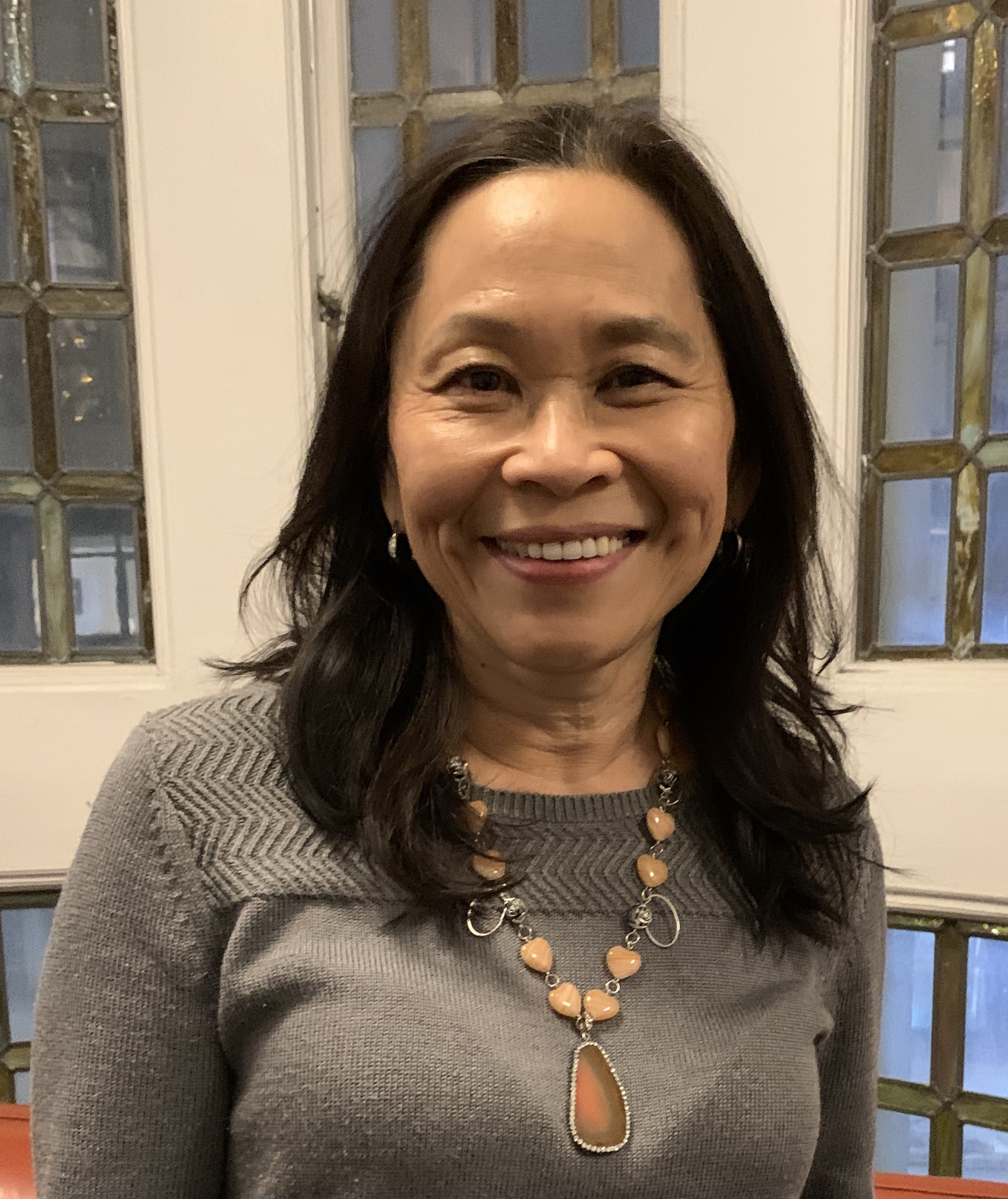
- Born: 1958 (age 67–68); Manila, Philippines
- Occupation: Professor
- Writing career
- Notable works: Asianfail: Narratives of Disenchantment and the Model Minority
- Website: www.wlu.ca/faculty/eleanor-ty

Eleanor Rose Ty is a Filipino-Canadian literary scholar who is a professor in the Department of English and Film Studies at Wilfrid Laurier University.

== Education ==
She holds a PhD and MA in English from McMaster University, and a BA Hons from the University of Toronto.

== Career ==
Ty works on Asian American and Asian Canadian literature and film, life writing, graphic novel, Canadian literature and Eighteenth Century British novels. She is the recipient of a Fulbright Canada Research Chair, 2018–2019, at the University of California, Santa Barbara. She was awarded University Research Professor at Wilfrid Laurier University in 2015.

She has published twelve books: two edited collections on memory studies, six books on Asian American and Asian Canadian Studies, and four on Eighteenth-Century British literature. Beyond the Icon: Asian American Graphic Narratives was awarded the 2022 Prize for Edited Book Collection by the Comics Studies Society. Asianfail: Narratives of Disenchantment and the Model Minority won the APALA: Asian/Pacific American Librarians Association award for Adult Non-Fiction book in Literature for 2017. Her co-edited book, Asian Canadian Writing Beyond Autoethnography, received an honorable mention in the literature category in 2008 from The Association for Asian American Studies. Her research on 18th Century revolutionary novelists, on Filipino American literature, and on women writers has often been cited by other scholars and resources.

In 2017, Ty served as the program co-chair with Angie Chung for the annual conference of the Association for Asian American Studies held in Portland, Oregon. With James Skidmore, Ty served as Academic Co-Convenor of Congress for the Canadian Federation for the Humanities and Social Sciences in 2012, held in Waterloo.

== Awards ==
- 2017-2018: Asianfail was the Winner of the 2017/18 Asian/Pacific American Award for Literature in Adult Non-Fiction Category. Awarded by the Asian/Pacific American Librarians Association
- 2018-2019: Fulbright Canada Visiting Research Chair, University of California, Santa Barbara
- 2019: Fellow of the Royal Society of Canada

== Selected publications ==
Books authored :

- Asianfail: Narratives of Disenchantment and the Model Minority. Champaign: University of Illinois Press, 2017
- Unfastened: Globality and Asian North American Narratives. Minneapolis: University of Minnesota Press, 2010
- The Politics of the Visible in Asian North American Narratives. Toronto: University of Toronto Press, 2004
- Empowering the Feminine: The Narratives of Mary Robinson, Jane West, and Amelia Opie, 1796-1812. Toronto: University of Toronto Press, 1998
- Unsex’d Revolutionaries: Five Women Novelists of the 1790s. Theory and Culture Series. Toronto: University of Toronto Press, 1993

Books/Journals edited:

- Beyond the Icon: Asian American Graphic Narratives. Columbus: Ohio State University Press, 2022.
- Migration, Exile and Diaspora in Graphic Life Narratives. a/b: Auto/Biography Studies (Co-edited with Candida Rifkind and Nima Naghibi). Spring 2020.
- Canadian Literature and Cultural Memory (Co-edited with Cynthia Sugars.) Toronto: Oxford University Press, 2014
- The Memory Effect: The Remediation of Memory in Literature and Film (Co-edited with Russell J.A. Kilbourn). Waterloo, ON: Wilfrid Laurier University Press, 2013
- Asian Canadian Writing Beyond Autoethnography (Co-edited with Christl Verduyn). Waterloo, ON: Wilfrid Laurier University Press, 2008
- Asian North American Identities Beyond the Hyphen (Co-edited with Donald Goellnicht). Bloomington: Indiana University Press, 2004
- Memoirs of Emma Courtney by Mary Hays (1796)(Ed.). Oxford: Oxford World's Classics, 1996. xlv + 220pp. 2nd ed., 2000
- The Victim of Prejudice by Mary Hays (1799)(Ed.). Peterborough and Lewiston, N.Y.: Broadview Press, 1994. xxxviii + 198pp. 2nd ed., 1998

Chapters in books: (Selected)

- Social Issues in Three 21st Century Texts About Growing up Canadian, in "Zeitschrift für Kanada-Studien" ZKS, 68, Wißner, Augsburg 2018 ISSN 0944-7008 pp 103 – 113
- "(East and Southeast) Asian Canadian Literature: The Strange and the Familiar." The Oxford Handbook of Canadian Literature. Ed. Cynthia Sugars. 564–582. New York: Oxford University Press, 2016
- "Contemporary Filipino American Writers and the Legacy of Imperialism." Chapter 21 of Cambridge History of Asian American Literature. Eds. Rajini Srikanth and Min Song. 371–386. New York: Cambridge University Press, 2015
- "Revising the Romance of the Land: Place in Settler Narratives by Contemporary Asian Canadian Writers." The Canadian Mosaic in the Age of Transnationalism. Ed. Brigitte Glaser and Jutta Ernst. Heidelberg: Universitatsverlag Winter Heidelberg, 2010. 163-178
- "A Filipino Prufrock in an Alien Land: Bienvenido Santos’ The Man Who (Thought He) Looked Like Robert Taylor." Lit: Literature, Interpretation, Theory. Special Issue on Asian American Literature and Culture. Ed. Karen Chow. 12.3 (Summer 2001): 267-283
