= Memoirs of Emma Courtney =

1796 epistolary novel by Mary Hays

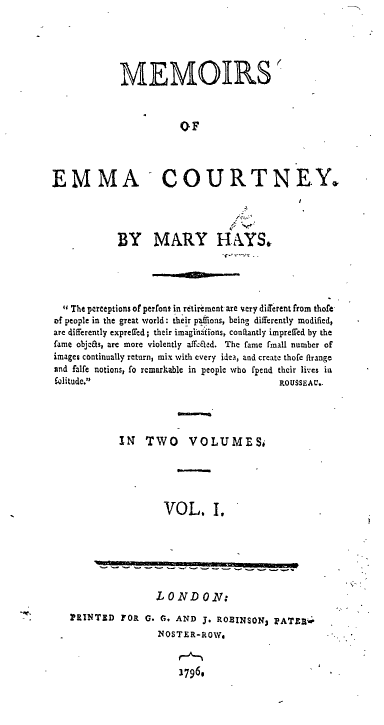
- Title page from the first edition
- Author: Mary Hays
- Language: English
- Genre: Epistolary novel
- Publication date: 1796
- Publication place: Britain
- Followed by: The Victim of Prejudice

Memoirs of Emma Courtney is an epistolary novel by Mary Hays, first published in 1796. The novel is partly autobiographical and based on the author's own unrequited love for William Frend . Mary Hay's relationship with William Godwin is reflected through her eponymous heroine's philosophical correspondence with Mr Francis. Contemporary moralists were scandalised at the novel's treatment of female passion, but Hays has more recently been called a "feminist pioneer" . Contemporary critics wrote of the apparently contrived ending that it was fantastical and unbelievable.

== Plot summary ==
The novel consists of a series of philosophical letters from the heroine, Emma Courtney, to Augustus Harley, a young man she calls her son, who has recently been disappointed in love. Emma tells her life story. In her youth, Emma falls deeply in love with Augustus's father, also named Augustus Harley, but her pursuit of him fails - his income is only secure as long as he remains unmarried. Although she initially refuses to accept a life of security by marrying her admirer Mr. Montague, Emma eventually accepts when Augustus Harley is revealed to be already married, and Emma herself is facing financial hardship. Emma's marriage results in a series of tragedies, despite the appearance of a beloved daughter, and her passion for her first love never ceases. Near the end of the novel the two will meet again under unfortunate circumstances. Harley dies after an accident, and Montague commits suicide after a sexual encounter with a maid, whom he leaves pregnant. Emma adopts Harley's eldest son, and devotes herself to the lives of her children.

== Impact ==
Reviews of the novel were mixed. The Memoirs of Emma Courtney was taken to be the true story of Hays' own life, and led various critics to mock and caricature her .

The novel addresses issues of female sexual passion, adultery, infanticide and suicide, as well as philosophical musings on the status of women in society. Emma reflects on "the inequalities of society, the source of every misery and vice, and on the peculiar disadvantages of my sex". Conservative readers would have been particularly shocked when Emma at one point offers herself to Augustus without demanding marriage.
