= Conduct =

Conduct may refer to:

== Actions ==
- Behavior, the range of actions and mannerisms made by entities
  - Human behavior, the way people act
    - Work behavior, the way people act on the job
  - Conduct disorder, a mental disorder
  - Action (philosophy), that which is done by an agent
- Conducting, directing a musical performance

== Other uses ==
- Conduct book, a genre of books that attempt to educate the reader on social norms
- Conduct money, money paid in some legal systems
- Conduct (album), an album by the band Fuck
- Conduct: An Introduction to Moral Philosophy, 1969 book by Ronald Field Atkinson
- Conduct (chaplain), a chaplain or a sub-chaplain of Eton or of certain colleges of Cambridge University

== See also ==
- Misconduct
- Disorderly conduct
- Conductor (disambiguation) (includes conduction)
- Conduct unbecoming (disambiguation)
