= Original Stories from Real Life =

Children's book by Mary Wollstonecraft

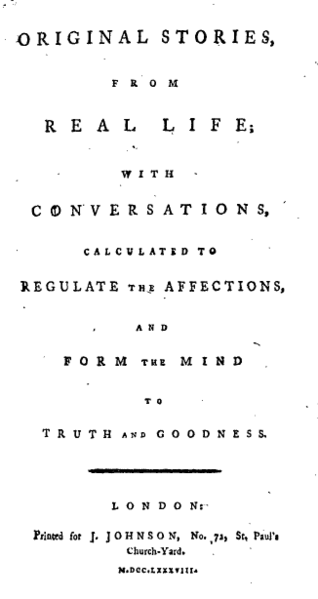
Title page from the first edition of Original Stories (1788)

Original Stories from Real Life; with Conversations Calculated to Regulate the Affections, and Form the Mind to Truth and Goodness is the only complete work of children's literature by the 18th-century English feminist author Mary Wollstonecraft. Original Stories begins with a frame story that sketches out the education of two young girls by their maternal teacher Mrs. Mason, followed by a series of didactic tales. The book was first published by Joseph Johnson in 1788; a second, illustrated edition, with engravings by William Blake, was released in 1791 and remained in print for around a quarter of a century.

In Original Stories, Wollstonecraft employed the then-burgeoning genre of children's literature to promote the education of women and an emerging middle-class ideology. She argued that women would be able to become rational adults if they were educated properly as children, which was not a widely held belief in the 18th century, and contended that the nascent middle-class ethos was superior to the court culture represented by fairy tales and to the values of chance and luck found in chapbook stories for the poor. Wollstonecraft, in developing her own pedagogy, also responded to the works of the two most important educational theorists of the 18th century: John Locke and Jean-Jacques Rousseau.

== Historical and biographical context ==
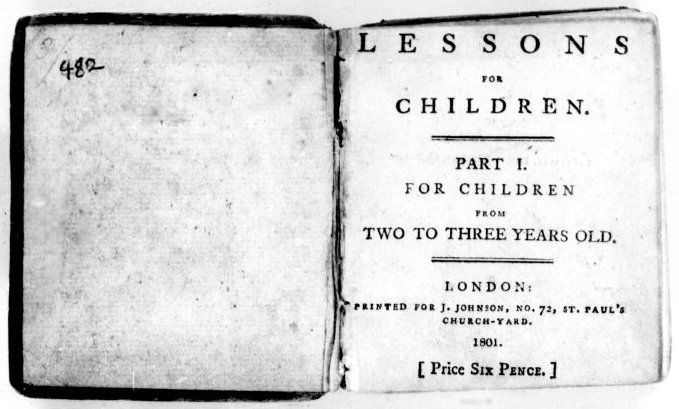
Title page from Barbauld's Lessons for Children (1778–79)

Wollstonecraft's oeuvre shows "a keen and vital concern with education, especially the education of girls and women". One year before she published Original Stories, she wrote a conduct book (a popular 18th-century genre, akin to the modern self-help book) entitled Thoughts on the Education of Daughters (1787), which describes how to raise the ideal middle-class woman. In 1789, she assembled The Female Speaker, a text meant to edify the minds of young women by exposing them to literature; she modelled it after William Enfield's anthology The Speaker, which was designed specifically for men. Just one year later, she translated Christian Gotthilf Salzmann's Elements of Morality, a popular German pedagogical text. Wollstonecraft continued writing on educational issues in her most famous work, A Vindication of the Rights of Woman (1792), which is largely a defence of female education. She also devotes an entire chapter to outlining a national education plan—she envisioned a half-public, half-private, co-educational system. She also directly challenged Rousseau's Emile (1762), which claimed that women should not be taught to reason since they were formed for men's pleasure and that their abilities lay in observation rather than reason. When Wollstonecraft died in 1797, she was working on two more educational works: "Management of Infants", a parenting manual; and "Lessons", a reading primer inspired by Anna Laetitia Barbauld's Lessons for Children (1778–79).

Wollstonecraft was not alone in focusing her revolutionary writings on education; as Alan Richardson, a scholar of the period, points out, "most liberal and radical intellectuals of the time viewed education as the cornerstone of any movement for social reform". One reason these thinkers emphasized the training of the young mind was the pervasive acceptance during the 18th century of Locke's theory of mind. He posited that the mind is a "blank slate" or tabula rasa, free from innate ideas, and that because children enter the world without preconceived notions; whatever ideas they absorb early in life will fundamentally affect their later development. Locke explained this process through a theory he labelled the association of ideas; the ideas that children connect, such as fear and darkness, are stronger than those ideas adults associate, therefore instructors, according to Locke, must carefully consider what they expose children to early in life.

== Plot summary ==
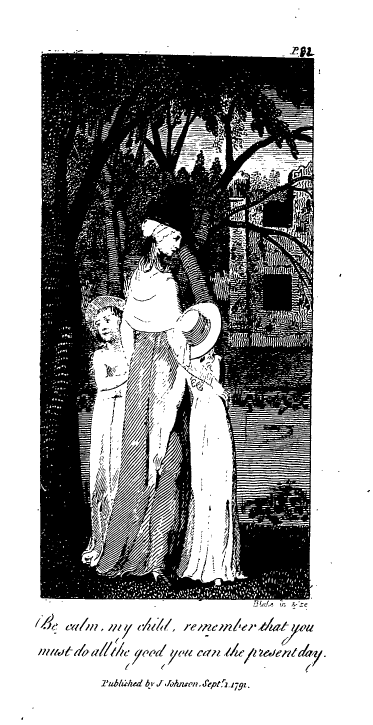
Mrs. Mason, Mary, and Caroline looking at Charles Townley's ruined mansion, by William Blake; caption reads: "Be calm, my child; remember that you must do all the good you can the present day."

Modelled on Madame de Genlis's Adèle et Théodore (1782) and Tales of the Castle (1785), both of which have frame stories and a series of inset moral tales, Original Stories narrates the re-education of two young girls, fourteen-year-old Mary and twelve-year-old Caroline, by a wise and benevolent maternal figure, Mrs. Mason. (Wollstonecraft probably named these characters after people in her own life. She became acquainted with a Miss Mason while teaching in Newington Green, whom she greatly respected, and she taught two girls named Mary and Caroline while she was a governess for the Kingsborough family in Ireland.) Margaret King, who was greatly affected by her governess, saying she "had freed her mind from all superstitions, later adopted "Mrs Mason" as a pseudonym.) After the death of their mother, the girls are sent to live with Mrs. Mason in the country. They are full of faults, such as greediness and vanity, and Mrs. Mason, through stories, real-world demonstrations, and her own example, cures the girls of most of their moral failings and imbues them with a desire to be virtuous.

Mrs. Mason's amalgam of tales and teaching excursions dominates the text; although the text emphasizes the girls' moral progress, the reader learns very little about the girls themselves. The work consists largely of personal histories of people known to Mrs. Mason and of moral tales for the edification of Mary and Caroline and the reader. For example, "The History of Charles Townley" illustrates the fatal consequences of procrastination. Mrs. Mason takes the girls to Charles Townley's ruined mansion to tell them the cautionary tale of a "boy of uncommon abilities, and strong feelings"; unfortunately, "he ever permitted those feelings to direct his conduct, without submitting to the direction of reason; I mean, the present emotion governed him ... He always indeed intended to act right in every particular to-morrow; but to-day he followed the prevailing whim" (emphasis Wollstonecraft's). Charles wants to help those in need, but he is easily distracted by novels and plays. He eventually loses all of his money but his one remaining friend helps him regain his fortune in India. Yet even when this friend needs assistance, Charles cannot act quickly enough and, tragically, his friend is imprisoned and dies and his friend's daughter is forced to marry a rake. When Charles returns to England, he is overcome with guilt. He rescues the daughter from her unhappy marriage, but both she and he have gone slightly insane by the end of the story, she from her marriage and he from guilt.

Original Stories is primarily about leaving the imperfections of childhood behind and becoming a rational and charitable adult; it does not romanticise childhood as an innocent and ideal state of being. The inset stories themselves emphasise the balance of reason and emotion required for the girls to become mature, a theme that permeates Wollstonecraft's works, particularly A Vindication of the Rights of Woman.

== Literary analysis ==
Original Stories gained a reputation in the 20th century as an oppressively didactic book and was derided by early scholars of children's literature such as Geoffrey Summerfield. Recent scholars, particularly Mitzi Myers, have re-evaluated Wollstonecraft's book and 18th-century children's literature in general, assessing it within its historical context rather than judging it according to modern tastes. Myers suggests, in her series of seminal articles, that women writers of children's literature such as Mary Wollstonecraft and Maria Edgeworth were not only using the genre of children's literature to teach but also to promote visions of society distinct from those of the Romantics. These authors believed that they could effect great change by exposing young children to their ideas of a better society, even though they were "only" writing stories about seemingly insignificant topics such as small animals or little girls. Myers argues that because scholars have traditionally paid more attention to Romantic poetry and prose (the works of William Wordsworth and Percy Bysshe Shelley, for example) than to children's literature, they have missed the social critique that these women writers of children's literature were offering.

=== Pedagogical theory ===
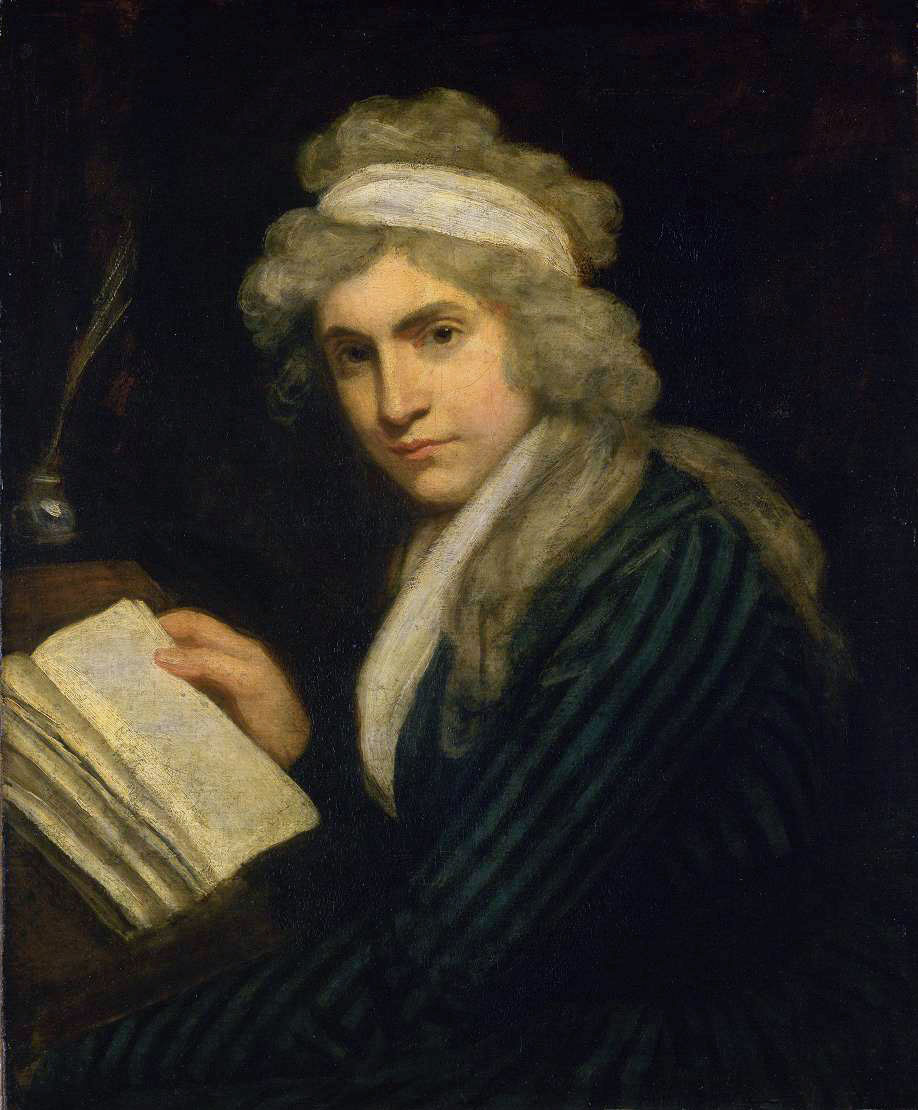
Mary Wollstonecraft by John Opie (c. 1791)

The two most influential pedagogical works in 18th-century Europe were John Locke's Some Thoughts Concerning Education (1693) and Jean-Jacques Rousseau's Emile. In Original Stories and her other works on education, Wollstonecraft responds to these two works and counters with her own pedagogical theory.

Wollstonecraft follows Locke in emphasising the role of the senses in learning; for her, as Myers writes, "ideally, children should learn not from direct teaching but from living examples apprehended through the senses." Wollstonecraft's Mrs. Mason takes Mary and Caroline out into the world in order to instruct them—their very first lesson is a nature walk that teaches them not to torture but rather to respect animals as part of God's creation. Mrs. Mason uses the experiences of everyday life as a teaching tool because they are grounded in concrete realities and easily absorbed through the senses; she will seize on "a bad habit, a passerby, a visit, a natural scene, a holiday festivity" and then apply them to a moral lesson that she wants to inculcate into her pupils. Mrs. Mason also tells Mary and Caroline the unfortunate or tragic histories of people she has known, such as that of Jane Fretful, who died because of her bad behaviour; Jane was an angry and selfish little girl and eventually her anger affected her health and killed her. Her misbehaviour "broke her mother's heart" and "hastened her death"; Jane's guilt over this event and:

her peevish temper, preyed on her impaired constitution. She had not, by doing good, prepared her soul for another state, or cherished any hopes that could disarm death of its terrors, or render that last sleep sweet—its approach was dreadful!—and she hastened her end, scolding the physician for not curing her. Her lifeless countenance displayed the marks of convulsive anger; and she left an ample fortune behind her to those who did not regret her loss. They followed her to the grave on which no one shed a tear. She was soon forgotten; and I [says Mrs. Mason] only remember her, to warn you to shun her errors.

Mrs. Mason also takes her charges to visit models of virtue, such as Mrs. Trueman, who, though poor, still manages to be charitable and a comfort to her family. At the end of one visit, Mrs. Mason reminds the girls that Mrs. Trueman "loves truth, and she is ever exercising benevolence and love—from the insect, that she avoids treading on, her affection may be traced to that Being who lives for ever.—And it is from her goodness her agreeable qualities spring." Wollstonecraft also adheres to the Lockean conception of the mind as a "blank slate": in Original Stories, Mrs. Mason describes her own mind using these same terms.

Wollstonecraft was not as receptive to Rousseau's ideas as she was to Locke's; she appropriated the aesthetic of the sublime to challenge Rousseau's ideas regarding the education of women (discussed in more detail below). During the 18th century, "the sublime" was associated with awe, fear, strength and masculinity. As Myers writes, "to convey her message for female readers that achievement comes from within, Wollstonecraft substitutes the strength, force, and mental expansion associated with heroic sublime for the littleness, delicacy, and beauty that Rousseau and aestheticians such as Edmund Burke equate with womanhood". Unlike writers such as Rousseau and Burke, who portray women as innately weak and silly, Wollstonecraft argues that women can indeed achieve the intellectual heights associated with the sublime.

Although Wollstonecraft disagreed with much of Rousseau's fundamental philosophy, she did agree with many of his educational methods, including his emphasis on teaching through example and experience rather than through precept. In this, she was following children's writers such as Thomas Day who, in his popular The History of Sandford and Merton (1783–89), also emphasised learning by experience rather than by rote and rules. Gary Kelly, in his book on Wollstonecraft's thought, explains how this idea and others important to Wollstonecraft are reflected in the title to her work—Original Stories from Real Life; with Conversations Calculated to Regulate the Affections, and Form the Mind to Truth and Goodness:

The first part of the title indicates that the ‘stories’ are not merely fictitious but have a factual basis in domestic, quotidian life, though readers would understand ‘from real life’ to mean ‘based on’ or ‘adapted from real ‘life’, and not necessarily ‘representation of actual events’. The ‘stories’ are ‘original’ because narratives for children should start afresh in order to avoid continued ideological contamination from vulgar chapbooks or courtly ‘fairy tales’. The phrase ‘real life’ strengthens ‘original’, excluding both the artificial and the fictional or imaginary. ‘Conversations’ suggests familiar, familial discourse rather than formal moralising. ‘Calculated’ suggests a programme rationally determined. These ‘conversations’ and ‘stories’ are also to construct the youthful self in a particular way, by regulating ‘the affections’ or emotional self and forming ‘the mind’ or rational and moral self ‘to truth and goodness’—understood in terms of professional middle-class culture.

As Richardson explains, in Original Stories adulthood is defined by the ability to discipline oneself by "constructing moral tales" out of one's life. Wollstonecraft's extensive use of inset tales encourages her readers to construct a moral narrative out of their own lives, with a predetermined ending. At the end of the book, Mary and Caroline no longer require a teacher because they have learnt the storylines which Mrs. Mason has taught them—they know the stories that they are supposed to enact.

=== Gender ===
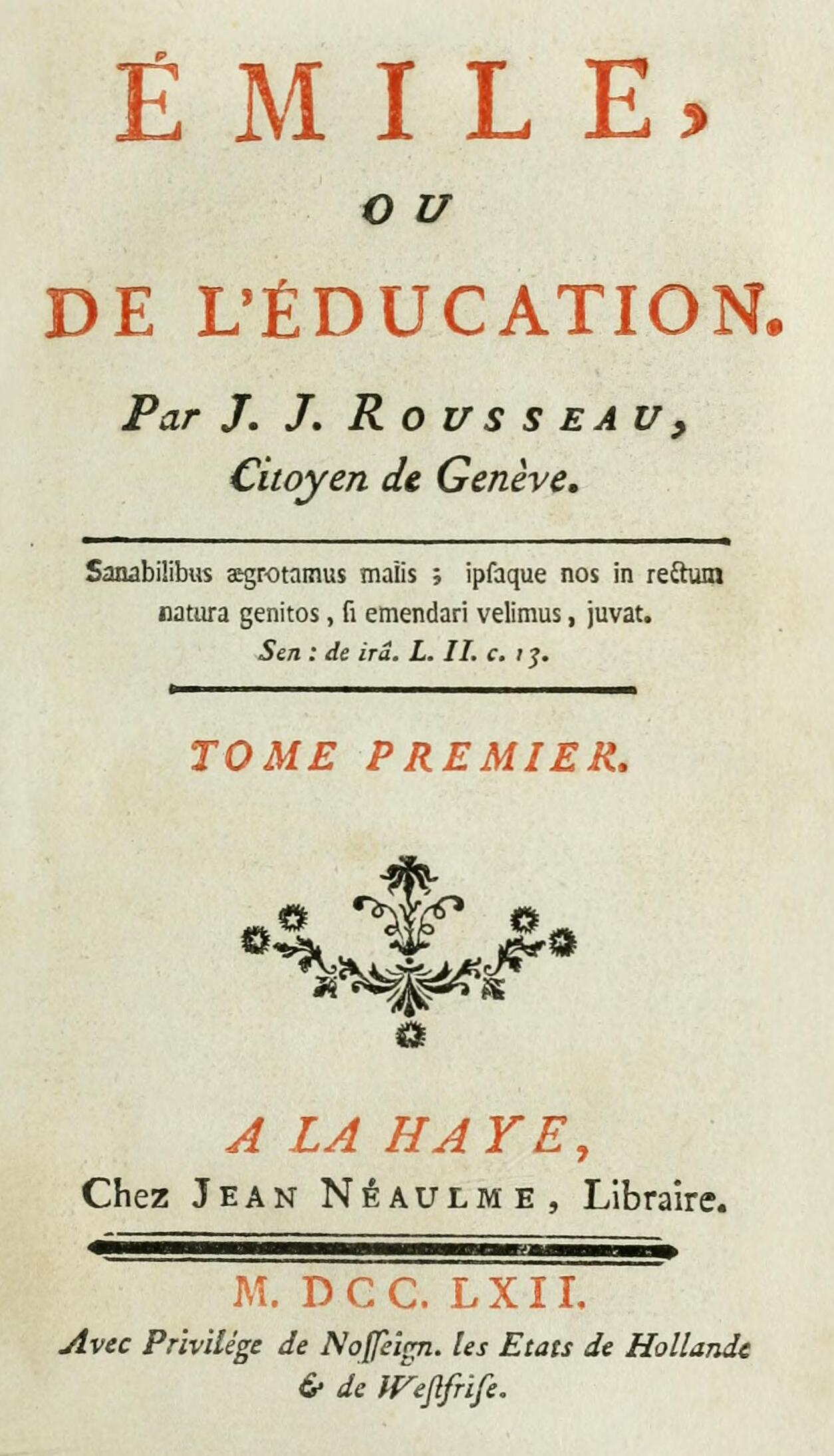
Title page from Rousseau's Emile (1762)

As in the Vindication of the Rights of Woman, Wollstonecraft does not highlight the differences between men and women as much as she emphasizes the importance of virtue in Original Stories. Moreover, she defines virtue in such a way that it applies to both sexes. Traditionally, as Kelly explains, virtue was tied to femininity and chastity, but Wollstonecraft's text rejects this definition and argues instead that virtue should be characterized by reason and self-control. Myers has also pointed out that Mrs. Mason's desire to instill rationality in her charges is potentially liberating for women readers and their daughters as such a pedagogy was in direct contrast to much that was being written at the time by conduct book writers such as James Fordyce and John Gregory and philosophers such as Rousseau, who asserted the intellectual weakness of women and the secondary status of their gender.

But it was against Rousseau's depiction of femininity and female education that Wollstonecraft was most vigorously reacting in Original Stories. Rousseau argued in Emile that women were naturally cunning and manipulative, but he viewed these traits positively:

[G]uile is a natural talent with the fair sex, and since I am persuaded that all the natural inclinations are good and right in themselves, I am of the opinion that this one should be cultivated like the others... This peculiar cleverness given to the fair sex is a very equitable compensation for their lesser share of strength, a compensation without which women would be not man’s companion but his slave. It is by means of this superiority in talent that she keeps herself his equal and that she governs him while obeying him... She has in her favor only her art and her beauty.

For Rousseau, women possessed "guile" and "beauty" that allowed them to control men while men possessed "strength" and "reason" that allowed them to control women. In contrast to Rousseau's presentation of Sophie, the fictional figure he employs in Book V of Emile to represent the ideal woman, who is enamoured of her own image in a mirror and who falls in love with a character in a novel, Wollstonecraft depicts Mrs. Mason as a rational and sincere teacher who attempts to pass those traits on to Mary and Caroline.

=== Class ===
Original Stories encourages its readers to develop what were at the time coming to be labelled middle-class values: industry, self-discipline, economy, and charity. As Andrew O’Malley points out in his analysis of 18th-century children's books, "middle-class writers wanted children to associate happiness with morality and social utility instead" of "the trappings of wealth and status". The end of the 18th century saw the development of what is now referred to as the "middle-class ethos", and "children’s literature became one of the crucial mechanisms for disseminating and consolidating middle-class ideology" throughout British and American society. Works by children's writers such as Anna Laetitia Barbauld, Ellenor Fenn, Sarah Trimmer, and Dorothy Kilner all embrace this ethos, although they differ radically in their opinions on other political issues, such as the French Revolution.

One way that writers such as Wollstonecraft helped to shape the new genre of children's literature at the end of the 18th century was by attempting to remove its chapbook and fairy tale associations and replace them with a middle-class ideology. Many of these writers considered chapbooks and fairy tales to be associated with the poor and the rich, respectively. As Kelly explains, "traditional chapbook literature embodies a lottery mentality of carpe diem, belief in fortune, wish for lucky gifts (such as great strength, cleverness or beauty), a view of time as cyclical or repetitive and an avid interest in predicting the future." In contrast, 18th-century children's literature "embodies an investment mentality. This meant saving for the future, ‘proper’ distribution of personal resources, avoiding extravagance, conceiving of time and one's own life as cumulative and progressive, and valuing self-discipline and personal development for a better future under one's own control." Sarah Trimmer, for example, contends in her Guardian of Education, the first successful periodical dedicated to reviewing children’s books, that children should not read fairy tales precisely because they will lead to slothfulness and superstition.

=== Illustrations ===
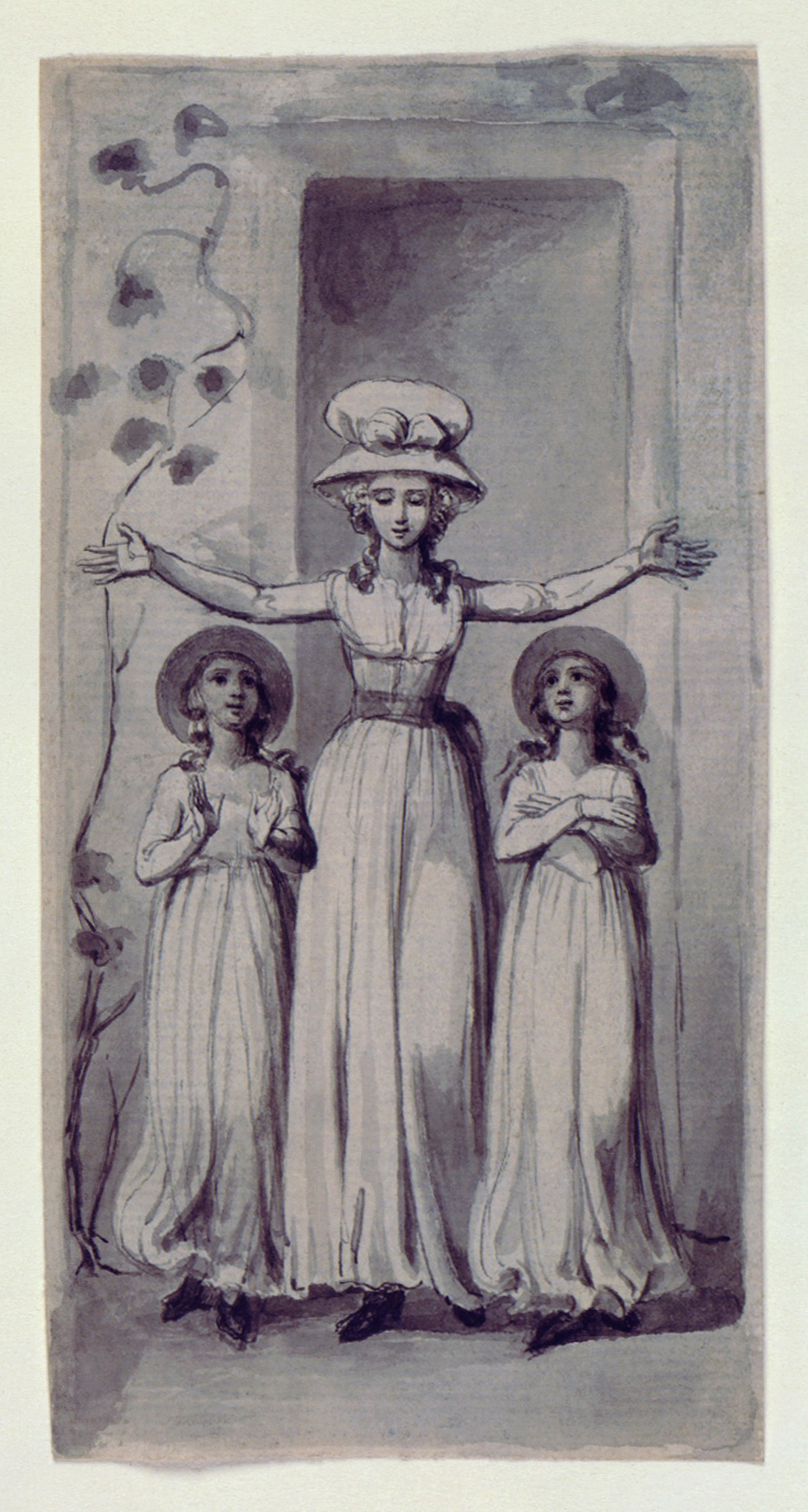
Sketch for the frontispiece for the 1791 edition of Original Stories, by William Blake. Scanned from Blake's sketch and digitally restored.

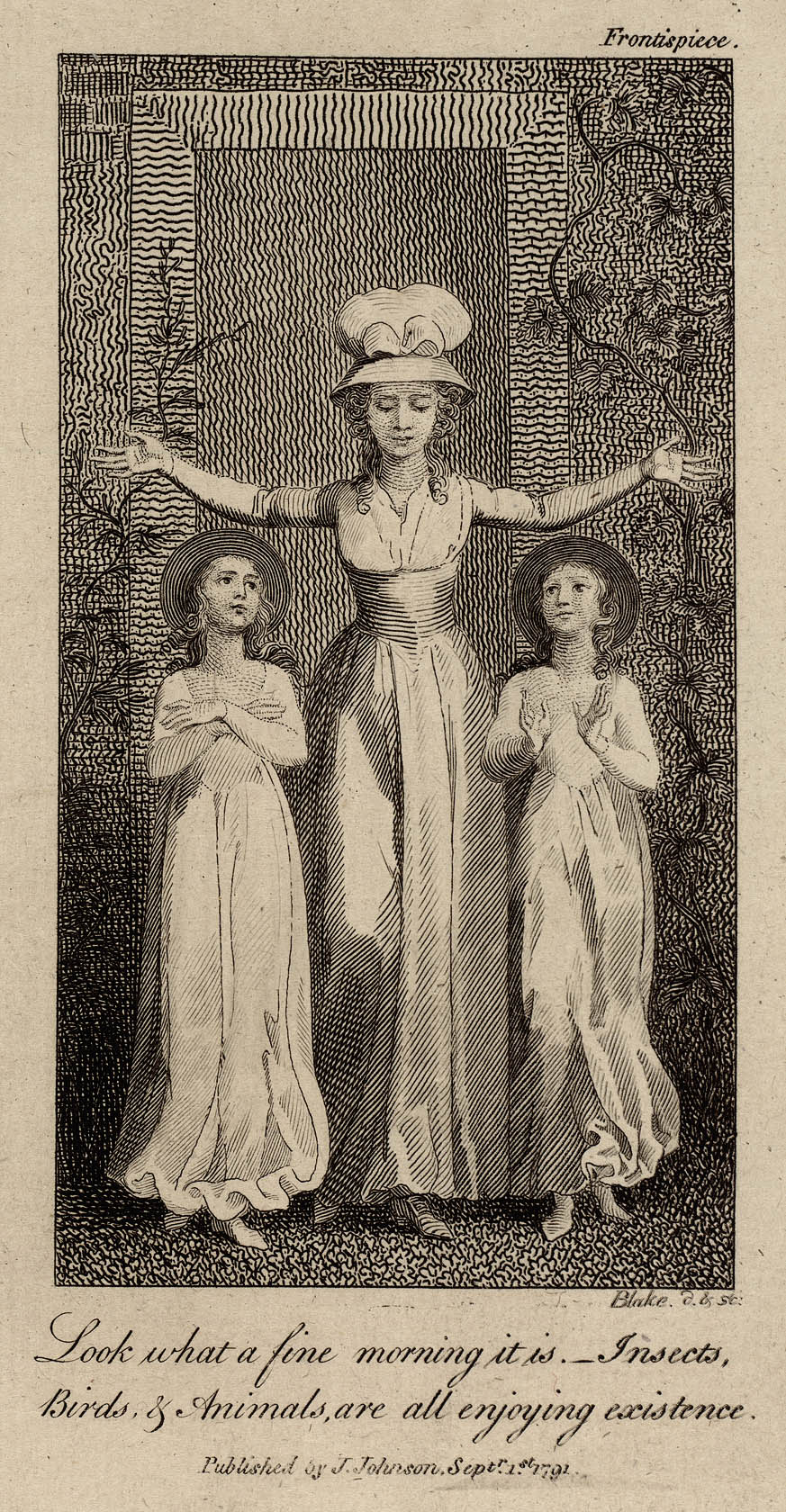
Engraved frontispiece for the 1791 edition of Original Stories, by William Blake

William Blake, who often did illustrative work for Wollstonecraft's publisher Joseph Johnson, was engaged to design and engrave six plates for the second edition of Original Stories. Blake scholars tend to read these plates as challenges to Wollstonecraft’s text. For example, Orm Mitchell, basing his interpretation on Blake's personal mythology (which is elaborated in his other works) argues that in the frontispiece to the work:

The two girls gaze out wistfully from beneath the outstretched arms of Mrs. Mason. The hats that the children wear are drawn in such a way that they form halos around their heads, a touch Blake also uses in Songs of Innocence and of Experience to indicate the innate and divine visionary capacity of the child (see for example "The Ecchoing Green" and "The Little [B]oy Found"). The children’s eyes are open—they are looking at what a fine morning it is and longing to take part in it. They cannot participate, however, for they are under the suffocating influence of Mrs. Mason. In contrast to the children’s halo-like hats Mrs. Mason wears a large cumbrous bonnet. Her eyes are downcast to such an extent that they appear to be shut. Blake often draws Urizen's eyes in this way to signify the blindness of his rational and materialist ‘Single vision.’ See for example plates 1, 9 and 22 of The Book of Urizen and plate 11 of For Children: The Gates of Paradise where Urizenic 'Aged Ignorance,’ wearing large spectacles, blindly clips the wings of a child thus preventing its imaginative flight in the morning sunrise. Ironically then, Mrs. Mason is the only individual in the illustration who is not seeing what a fine morning it is. She looks down at the hard factual earth, ignoring the infinite and holy life around her. (emphasis Mitchell's)

Myers, in contrast, relying on a more traditional art historical interpretation of the image, reads it more positively. She agrees that the children's hats resemble halos but she identifies Mrs. Mason's position as one of a "protective cruciform", evoking a "heroic, even Christlike ... female mentorial tradition". Myers views Mrs. Mason as a sacrificial hero rather than as an oppressive adult who cannot see the glories of nature.

== Publication and reception history ==
Original Stories was first published anonymously in 1788, the same year as Wollstonecraft's first novel Mary: A Fiction, and cost two shillings. When the second edition came out in 1791, Wollstonecraft's name was printed on the title page; after the publication in 1790 of her Vindication of the Rights of Men, she had become well known and her name would have boosted sales. Joseph Johnson, the publisher of Original Stories and all of Wollstonecraft's other works, commissioned William Blake to design six illustrations for the second edition, which cost two shillings and six pence. It is not entirely clear how long the book remained continuously in print. According to Gary Kelly, a prominent Wollstonecraft scholar, the last edition of Original Stories was published in 1820, but without Wollstonecraft's name on the title page; by that time she had become a reviled figure in Britain because her husband, William Godwin, had revealed her unorthodox lifestyle in his Memoirs of the Author of A Vindication of the Rights of Woman (1798). According to Alan Richardson and the editors of the Masterworks of Children's Literature series, Original Stories was published until 1835. It was also printed in Dublin in 1791 and 1799 and translated into German in 1795.

By the time C. M. Hewins, a librarian for the Hartford Library Association who wrote children's books herself, wrote a "History of Children's Books" in The Atlantic Monthly in 1888, Original Stories was more famous for its plates by Blake than it was for its text by Wollstonecraft. The bulk of the article's discussion is dedicated to Blake, although, strangely enough, not to his work on Original Stories. Hewins does mention that the book was "new and in demand in the autumn of that year [1791], [but is] now unknown to the bookstalls". Original Stories is now primarily reprinted for scholars, students, and those interested in the history of children's literature.

== See also ==
- Timeline of Mary Wollstonecraft

== Modern reprints ==
=== Full ===
- Bator, Robert, ed. Masterworks of Children's Literature: The Middle Period, c.1740 – c.1836. Vol. 3. New York: Stonehill Publishing Company, 1983. ISBN 0-87754-377-1.
- Todd, Janet and Marilyn Butler, eds. The Complete Works of Mary Wollstonecraft. 7 vols. London: William Pickering, 1989. ISBN 0-8147-9225-1. (in volume 4)
- Wollstonecraft, Mary. Original Stories from Real Life. London: Printed for Joseph Johnson, 1788. Available from Eighteenth Century Collections Online. (by subscription only) Retrieved on 13 October 2007.
- Wollstonecraft, Mary. Original Stories from Real Life. 2nd ed. London: Printed for Joseph Johnson, 1791. Available from Eighteenth Century Collections Online. (by subscription only) Retrieved on 13 October 2007.

=== Partial ===
- Carpenter, Humphrey and Mari Prichard, eds. Oxford Companion to Children's Literature. Oxford: Oxford University Press, 1997. ISBN 0-19-860228-6.
- Demmers, Patricia, ed. From Instruction to Delight: An Anthology of Children's Literature to 1850. Oxford: Oxford University Press, 2003. ISBN 0-19-541889-1.
- Zipes, Jack, Lissa Paul, Lynne Vallone, Peter Hunt and Gillian Avery, eds. The Norton Anthology of Children's Literature. New York: W.W. Norton & Co., 2005. ISBN 0-393-97538-X.

== Bibliography ==
- Chandler, Anne. "Wollstonecraft’s Original Stories: Animal Objects and the Subject of Fiction". Eighteenth-Century Novel 2 (2002): 325–51.
- Darton, F. J. Harvey. Children's Books in England: Five Centuries of Social Life. 3rd ed. Rev. by Brian Alderson. Cambridge: Cambridge University Press, 1982. ISBN 0-521-24020-4.
- Jackson, Mary V. Engines of Instruction, Mischief and Magic: Children's Literature in England from Its Beginnings to 1839. Lincoln: University of Nebraska Press, 1989. ISBN 0-8032-7570-6.
- Kelly, Gary. Revolutionary Feminism: The Mind and Career of Mary Wollstonecraft. London: Macmillan, 1992. ISBN 0-312-12904-1.
- Myers, Mitzi. "Impeccable Governesses, Rational Dames, and Moral Mothers: Mary Wollstonecraft and the Female Tradition in Georgian Children’s Books". Children’s Literature 14 (1986): 31–59.
- Mitchell, Orm. "Blake’s Subversive Illustrations to Wollstonecraft’s Stories". Mosaic 17.4 (1984): 17–34.
- O'Malley, Andrew. The Making of the Modern Child: Children's Literature and Childhood in the Late Eighteenth Century. London: Routledge, 2003. ISBN 0-415-94299-3
- Pickering, Samuel, F. Jr. John Locke and Children’s Books in Eighteenth-Century England. Knoxville: The University of Tennessee Press, 1981. ISBN 0-87049-290-X.
- Richardson, Alan. Literature, Education, and Romanticism: Reading as Social Practice, 1780–1832. Cambridge: Cambridge University Press, 1994. ISBN 0-521-60709-4
- Richardson, Alan. "Mary Wollstonecraft on education". The Cambridge Companion to Mary Wollstonecraft. Ed. Claudia L. Johnson. Cambridge: Cambridge University Press, 2002. ISBN 0-521-78952-4.
- Rousseau, Jean-Jacques. Emile: Or, On Education. Trans. Allan Bloom. New York: Basic Books, 1979. ISBN 0-465-01931-5.
- Summerfield, Geoffrey. Fantasy and Reason: Children’s Literature in the Eighteenth Century. Athens: The University of Georgia Press, 1984. ISBN 0-8203-0763-7.
- Wardle, Ralph M. Mary Wollstonecraft: A Critical Biography. Lincoln: University of Nebraska Press, 1951. OCLC 361220
- Welch, Dennis M. "Blake’s Response to Wollstonecraft’s Original Stories". Blake: An Illustrated Quarterly 13 (1979): 4–15.
