= Knowledge and Explanation in History =

1978 book by Ronald Field Atkinson

Knowledge and Explanation in History: An Introduction to the Philosophy of History
- Author: Ronald Field Atkinson
- Language: English
- Subject: philosophy of history
- Publisher: Cornell University Press
- Publication date: 1978
- Media type: Print
- ISBN: 978-1-349-15965-9

Knowledge and Explanation in History: An Introduction to the Philosophy of History is a 1978 book by Ronald Field Atkinson in which the author tries to provide an introductory text in philosophy of history. The book was reviewed by Rex Martin, Patrick Nowell-Smith, William H. Dray and L. Gordon Graham.
