= Improper Conduct =

Improper Conduct may refer to:

- Improper Conduct (1984 film), documentary directed by Néstor Almendros and Orlando Jiménez Leal
- Improper Conduct (1994 film), by Everest Pictures directed by Jag Mundhra and starring Steven Bauer, Tahnee Welch and Nia Peeples
- Misconduct

== See also ==
- Conduct (disambiguation)
