= Ronald Atkinson =

Ronald Atkinson may refer to:

- Ronald Field Atkinson (1928–2005), British philosopher and professor
- Ron Atkinson (born 1939), English football player and manager
