= Timeline of Mary Wollstonecraft =

English Philosopher

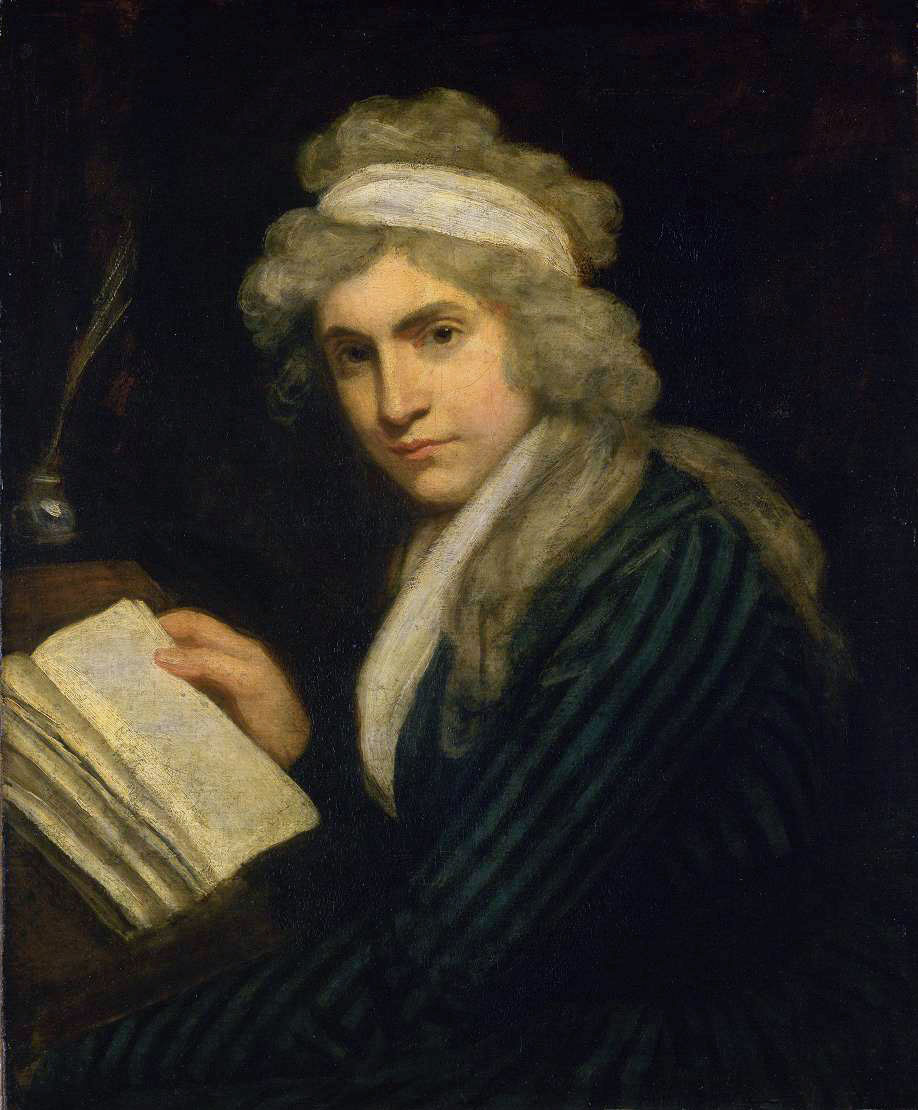
Mary Wollstonecraft by John Opie (c. 1791)

The lifetime of British writer, philosopher, and feminist Mary Wollstonecraft (1759–1797) encompassed most of the second half of the eighteenth century, a time of great political and social upheaval throughout Europe and America: political reform movements in Britain gained strength, the American colonists successfully rebelled, and the French Revolution erupted. Wollstonecraft experienced only the headiest of these days, not living to see the end of the democratic revolution when Napoleon crowned himself emperor. Although Britain was still revelling in its mid-century imperial conquests and its triumph in the Seven Years' War, it was the French revolution that defined Wollstonecraft's generation. As poet Robert Southey later wrote: "few persons but those who have lived in it can conceive or comprehend what the memory of the French Revolution was, nor what a visionary world seemed to open upon those who were just entering it. Old things seemed passing away, and nothing was dreamt of but the regeneration of the human race."

Part of what made reform possible in Britain in the second half of the eighteenth century was the dramatic increase in publishing; books, periodicals, and pamphlets became much more widely available than they had been just a few decades earlier. This increase in available printed material helped facilitate the rise of the British middle class. Reacting against what they viewed as aristocratic decadence, the new professional middle classes (made prosperous through British manufacturing and trade), offered their own ethical code: reason, meritocracy, self-reliance, religious toleration, free inquiry, free enterprise, and hard work. They set these values against what they perceived as the superstition and unreason of the poor and the prejudices, censorship, and self-indulgence of the rich. They also helped establish what has come to be called the "cult of domesticity", which solidified gender roles for men and women. This new vision of society rested on the writings of Scottish Enlightenment philosophers such as Adam Smith, who had developed a theory of social progress founded on sympathy and sensibility. A partial critique of the rationalist Enlightenment, these theories promoted a combination of reason and feeling that enabled women to enter the public sphere because of their keen moral sense. Wollstonecraft's writings stand at the nexus of all of these changes. Her educational works, such as her children's book Original Stories from Real Life (1788), helped inculcate middle-class values, and her two Vindications, A Vindication of the Rights of Men (1790) and A Vindication of the Rights of Woman (1792), argue for the value of an educated, rational populace, specifically one that includes women. In her two novels, Mary: A Fiction and Maria: or, The Wrongs of Woman, she explores the ramifications of sensibility for women.

The end of the eighteenth century was a time of great hope for progressive reformers such as Wollstonecraft. Like the revolutionary pamphleteer Thomas Paine and others, Wollstonecraft was not content to remain on the sidelines. She sought out intellectual debate at the home of her publisher Joseph Johnson, who gathered leading thinkers and artists for weekly dinners, and she traveled extensively, first to be a part of the French revolution and later to seek a lost treasure ship for her lover in what was then exotic Scandinavia, turning her journey into a travel book, Letters Written in Sweden, Norway, and Denmark. After two complicated and heart-rending affairs with the artist Henry Fuseli and the American adventurer Gilbert Imlay (with whom she had an illegitimate daughter, Fanny Imlay), Wollstonecraft married the philosopher William Godwin, one of the forefathers of the anarchist movement. Together, they had one daughter: Mary Shelley, the author of Frankenstein. Wollstonecraft died at the age of 38 due to complications from this birth, leaving behind several unfinished manuscripts. Today, she is most often remembered for her political treatise A Vindication of the Rights of Woman and is considered a foundational feminist philosopher.

== Timeline ==
=== 1750s ===
Year	Wollstonecraft	Literature	History
1756	Marriage of Edward John Wollstonecraft (born 1736) and Elizabeth Dickson (born c. 1740) (Wollstonecraft's parents); 3 March – Birth of William Godwin, philosopher and future husband of Mary Wollstonecraft, in Wisbech, Cambridgeshire		May – Beginning of Seven Years' War
1757	Birth of Edward (Ned) Wollstonecraft (brother to Mary)	Publication of Edmund Burke's treatise A Philosophical Enquiry into the Origin of Our Ideas of the Sublime and Beautiful	23 June – Indian province of Bengal passes into British control after the Battle of Plassey
1759	27 April – Birth of Mary Wollstonecraft in Spitalfields, London	Publication of Samuel Johnson's novel Rasselas; Publication of Voltaire's novel Candide; Publication of Adam Smith's treatise The Theory of Moral Sentiments	

=== 1760s ===
Year	Wollstonecraft	Literature	History
1760		June – James Macpherson allegedly translates, but himself actually writes, poems by Ossian; published as Fragments of Ancient Poetry collected in the Highlands of Scotland; Publication of the first volume of Laurence Sterne's novel Tristram Shandy (1760–1767)	April – Tacky's Slave Revolt in Jamaica; 25 October – George III (pictured) ascends to the throne of Britain
1761	Birth of Henry Woodstock Wollstonecraft (brother to Mary)	Publication of Jean-Jacques Rousseau's novel Julie, or the New Heloise	
1762		Publication of Rousseau's treatise Emile; Publication of Rousseau's treatise The Social Contract; Publication of Lord Kames's treatise Elements of Criticism	
1763	Birth of Elizabeth (Eliza) Wollstonecraft (sister to Mary); The Wollstonecraft family moves to Epping Forest		February – Seven Years' War ends with the Treaty of Paris; April – Radical journalist John Wilkes is arrested for criticizing George III
1765	Birth of Everina (Averina) Wollstonecraft (sister to Mary); The Wollstonecraft family moves to Barking	Publication of Johnson's collected works of Shakespeare; Publication of Horace Walpole's The Castle of Otranto, widely considered the first Gothic novel; Publication of William Blackstone's treatise Commentaries on the Laws of England	March – Riots erupt in American colonies after the British parliament levies the stamp tax
1766		Publication of Rousseau's autobiography, Confessions; Publication of Oliver Goldsmith's novel The Vicar of Wakefield	
1768	Birth of James Wollstonecraft (brother to Mary); October – The Wollstonecraft family moves to Beverley, Yorkshire; Wollstonecraft meets Jane Arden, her first intimate friend	Publication of Laurence Sterne's novel A Sentimental Journey through France and Italy	James Cook voyages to Australia and New Zealand (1768–1771); Joshua Reynolds founds the Royal Academy in Britain
1769			David Garrick's Shakespeare Jubilee celebration at Stratford-on-Avon

=== 1770s ===
Year	Wollstonecraft	Literature	History
1770	Birth of Charles Wollstonecraft (brother to Mary)	Publication of Goldsmith's poem The Deserted Village; Publication of Part I of Goethe's play Faust	January – Frederick, Lord North becomes Prime Minister of Great Britain (1770–1782)
1771		Publication of the first edition of the Encyclopædia Britannica	Richard Arkwright opens the first cotton mill in Cromford, Derbyshire, England
1772		December – Publication of Anna Laetitia Barbauld's Poems; December – Publication of Miscellaneous Pieces in Prose by Barbauld and her brother, John Aikin	22 June – Slavery is effectively outlawed in England
1773			16 December – American colonists protest British policies by dumping tea into Boston Harbor
1774	The Wollstonecraft family moves to Hoxton; Wollstonecraft meets Mr. and Mrs. Clare, who provide a second home for her and educate her; Through the Clares, Wollstonecraft first meets Fanny Blood, for whom she will develop deep feelings	Publication of Goethe's novel The Sorrows of Young Werther	May – Louis XVI (pictured) ascends to the throne of France; Warren Hastings becomes the first Governor-General of India
1775			18 April – The American Revolution (1775–1783) begins with the Battle of Lexington; James Watt invents the steam engine
1776	The Wollstonecraft family moves to Laugharne, Wales	Publication of Adam Smith's treatise Wealth of Nations; Publication of the first volume of Edward Gibbon's The History of the Decline and Fall of the Roman Empire (1776–1788)	
1777	The Wollstonecraft family moves to Walworth, London	Richard Brinsley Sheridan's play The School for Scandal opens at Drury Lane Theatre	
1778	Wollstonecraft's first job – paid companion to Mrs. Sarah Dawson in Windsor and Bath	Publication of Frances Burney's novel Evelina; Publication of Barbauld's (pictured) reading primer Lessons for Children	
1779		Publication of Johnson's Lives of the Poets (1779–1781)	

=== 1780s ===
Year	Wollstonecraft	Literature	History
1780	Wollstonecraft's parents and younger siblings move to Enfield		2–11 June – Gordon Riots in London, protesting the Catholic Relief Act; Major John Cartwright founds the radical Society for Constitutional Information
1781	Autumn – Wollstonecraft returns home to nurse her ill mother	Publication of Barbauld's Hymns in Prose for Children	19 October – French and American forces defeat the British at the Battle of Yorktown, effectively ending the American War of Independence
1782	19 April – Wollstonecraft's mother dies; Wollstonecraft's father remarries and moves to Wales; Wollstonecraft moves to Walham Green to live with Fanny Blood and her family; 20 October – Eliza, Wollstonecraft's sister, marries Meredith Bishop	Publication of Burney's (pictured) novel Cecilia	
1783	10 August (?) – Eliza gives birth to a daughter and develops postpartum depression; Wollstonecraft's second job – starts school in Islington		3 September – Treaty of Versailles signed, formally ending the American Revolution; 21 November – The Montgolfier brothers of France launch the first manned hot-air balloon; December – William Pitt becomes Prime Minister of Great Britain
1784	At the instigation of Wollstonecraft, Eliza leaves her husband and child (who dies later in the year); Wollstonecraft's school moves from Islington to Newington Green; Eliza, Everina, and Fanny help teach; Wollstonecraft becomes friends with the minister Richard Price (pictured); Wollstonecraft meets author Samuel Johnson		Pitt's India Act gives the British Crown the power to guide Indian politics (as opposed to officers of the East India Company)
1785	February – Fanny Blood marries Hugh Skeys in Lisbon; Wollstonecraft travels to Lisbon; November – Fanny gives birth to a child and dies shortly thereafter; December – Wollstonecraft returns to London	Publication of William Cowper's poem The Task	
1786	Wollstonecraft's school in Newington Green fails due to financial difficulties; August – Wollstonecraft's third job – governess to the Anglo-Irish Kingsborough family; Wollstonecraft begins work on her conduct book, Thoughts on the Education of Daughters		December – Shays' Rebellion (December 1786 – January 1787); Beginning of impeachment proceedings against Warren Hastings, Governor-General of India
1787	Publication of Wollstonecraft's first book, Thoughts on the Education of Daughters (pictured) by Joseph Johnson; Wollstonecraft travels with the Kingsboroughs to Bristol where she writes her first novel, Mary: A Fiction, and the fragment "Cave of Fancy"; August – Wollstonecraft is dismissed from her governess position by Lady Kingsborough; Wollstonecraft returns to London; Wollstonecraft's fourth job – translator, reader, reviewer, and editorial assistant for Joseph Johnson and Thomas Christie's Analytical Review; Through Johnson, Wollstonecraft meets political reformer Thomas Holcroft, artist and writer Henry Fuseli, radical Joel Barlow, linguist and reformer John Horne Tooke, and writer Anna Laetitia Barbauld		13 May – First fleet of convicts sails to penal colony in Australia from Britain; 22 May – Committee for the Abolition of the Slave Trade is formed in Britain
1788	May – Analytical Review begins publication; Publication of Wollstonecraft's first novel, Mary: A Fiction, by Johnson; Publication of Wollstonecraft's children's book, Original Stories from Real Life, by Johnson; Publication of Wollstonecraft's translation of Jacques Necker's Of the Importance of Religious Opinions by Johnson	1 January – First edition of The Times of London is published; Publication of Charlotte Smith's novel Emmeline	November – Beginning of the Regency Crisis, caused by George III's madness
1789	Publication of Wollstonecraft's anthology, The Female Reader, by Johnson (published under the pseudonym of Mr. Cresswick); Wollstonecraft becomes romantically involved with the artist and writer Henry Fuseli	29 April – Publication of The Interesting Narrative of the Life of Olaudah Equiano, an autobiography by a former slave; Publication of William Blake's poems Songs of Innocence	20 June – Tennis Court Oath taken by the French National Assembly; 14 July – Storming of the Bastille in Paris (pictured); 26 August – The French Assembly adopts the Declaration of the Rights of Man and of the Citizen; 5–6 October – "October days"; Parisian women, unable to buy bread, march to Versailles and bring the royal family back to Paris; 4 November – Richard Price gives his sermon "A Discourse on the Love of Our Country" at a meeting of the London Revolution Society, to which Burke would respond a year later, igniting the Revolution Controversy in Britain; December – End of the Regency Crisis (George III recovers)

=== 1790s ===
Year	Wollstonecraft	Literature	History
1790	Publication of Wollstonecraft's translation of Maria Geertruida van de Werken de Cambon's Young Grandison by Johnson; Publication of Wollstonecraft's translation of Christian Gotthilf Salzmann's Elements of Morality, for the Use of Children, illustrated by William Blake, by Johnson; 29 November – Publication of the first edition Wollstonecraft's treatise A Vindication of the Rights of Men by Johnson (anonymous); 18 December – Publication of the second edition of A Vindication of the Rights of Men, with Wollstonecraft's name on the title page, by Johnson (pictured); Wollstonecraft temporarily adopts Ann, a seven-year-old relative of Hugh Skeys (Fanny Blood's husband)	1 November – Publication of Edmund Burke's treatise Reflections on the Revolution in France; Publication of Helen Maria Williams's Letters from France	Motions for the repeal of the Test and Corporation Acts withdrawn; Breach between Edmund Burke and Charles James Fox over the French Revolution
1791	1 September – Publication of the second edition of Wollstonecraft's Original Stories from Real Life, with illustrations by William Blake, by Johnson; September – Wollstonecraft begins writing A Vindication of the Rights of Woman; November – Wollstonecraft first meets William Godwin at one of Johnson's famous dinners; they dislike each other; Wollstonecraft has her portrait painted by John Opie (see top of page)	February–March – Publication of Part I of Thomas Paine's (pictured) pamphlet Rights of Man; Publication of Elizabeth Inchbald's novel A Simple Story; Publication of James Boswell's Life of Johnson; Publication of Ann Radcliffe's novel The Romance of the Forest; Publication of Erasmus Darwin's poems The Botanic Garden; Publication of Smith's novel Celestina	19 April – The British parliament rejects William Wilberforce's bill to abolish the slave trade; 14–17 July – Priestley Riots; rioting aimed at religious Dissenters in Birmingham; August – 100,000 slaves and ex-slaves revolt against planters and the local government in French-controlled San Domingo, the wealthiest colony of the West Indies and main source of sugar and coffee in Europe
1792	January – Publication of Wollstonecraft's treatise A Vindication of the Rights of Woman by Johnson; February – Wollstonecraft meets Talleyrand, to whom she dedicated the Rights of Woman; Wollstonecraft falls in love with Henry Fuseli; Wollstonecraft, Fuseli, and his wife come to an emotional crisis; December – Wollstonecraft leaves for Paris; Wollstonecraft meets revolutionary Thomas Paine and writer Helen Maria Williams in Paris; Commissioned by friend and artist William Roscoe, Wollstonecraft's portrait is painted by an unknown artist	Publication of Robert Bage's novel Man As He Is; Publication of Hannah More's pamphlet Village Politics; Publication of Smith's novel Desmond	25 January – The London Corresponding Society (1792 – 1794) formed under the leadership of Thomas Hardy; 7 March – Sierra Leone is established under British rule as a home for former slaves; 10 August – Attack on the Tuileries Palace leads to the deposition of Louis XVI and the dissolution of the Legislative Assembly; 2–6 September – "September Massacres"; 12,000 political prisoners murdered in France; 21 September – Newly elected National Convention abolishes the monarchy and officially declares France a Republic; 20 November – John Reeves founds the Association for Preserving Liberty and Property against Republicans and Levellers in Britain in response to the French Revolution and the London Corresponding Society; 18 December – Paine is found guilty of seditious libel for the Rights of Man and sentenced to death in Britain
1793	Wollstonecraft meets and falls in love with American adventurer Gilbert Imlay in France; Wollstonecraft registers as Imlay's wife at the United States embassy in France for protection during the Reign of Terror; June – Wollstonecraft moves from Paris to Neuilly to escape the revolutionary violence; September – Wollstonecraft, now pregnant, returns to Paris	14 February – Publication of Godwin's treatise Political Justice; Publication of Smith's novel The Old Manor House	21 January – Execution of Louis XVI; 1 February – France declares war on England; 11 March – Civil war erupts in France with the revolt in the Vendée; July – Beginning of the Reign of Terror in France; 16 October – Execution of Marie Antoinette (pictured)
1794	January – Wollstonecraft moves to Le Havre, France; 14 May – Birth of Wollstonecraft and Imlay's daughter, Fanny Imlay, in Le Havre; Imlay returns to England, leaving Wollstonecraft and their daughter alone; December – Publication of Wollstonecraft's An Historical and Moral View of the Origin and Progress of the French Revolution in London	28 May – Publication of Godwin's novel Caleb Williams; Publication of Blake's poems Songs of Experience; Publication of Paine's treatise The Age of Reason; Publication of Radcliffe's novel The Mysteries of Udolpho	4 February – France abolishes slavery in its colonies; 7 May – Habeas corpus is suspended in Britain; Late July – Robespierre is executed and the Reign of Terror ends; November – British radicals are acquitted at the 1794 Treason Trials
1795	April – Wollstonecraft returns to London to join Imlay and learns of his infidelity; May – Wollstonecraft's first suicide attempt; she is saved by Imlay; June–September – Wollstonecraft journeys to Scandinavia on business for Imlay; October – Wollstonecraft's second suicide attempt; she jumps off Putney Bridge into the River Thames and is saved by strangers	Hannah More begins publishing the Cheap Repository Tracts to counteract radical publications	29 October – On the way to parliament, George III is attacked by a hungry mob; 18 December – Seditious Meetings Act and Treasonable Practices Act passed (also known as the "Two Acts" or the "Gagging Acts"); Methodists secede from the Church of England; The Famine Year
1796	January – Publication of Wollstonecraft's Letters Written in Sweden, Norway, and Denmark by Johnson; 21 August – Wollstonecraft begins affair with William Godwin; Wollstonecraft starts to write Maria: or, The Wrongs of Woman	Publication of Bage's novel Hermsprong; Publication of Mary Hays's novel Memoirs of Emma Courtney; Publication of Barbauld and Aikin's children's series Evenings at Home; Publication of Burney's novel Camilla; Publication of Matthew Lewis's novel The Monk	December – Failed French landing at Bantry Bay, West Cork, Ireland; Failure of peace negotiations between Britain and France
1797	John Opie paints Wollstonecraft's portrait (at right); 29 March – Wollstonecraft and Godwin marry; they lose friends because it is revealed that Wollstonecraft was never married to Imlay; 30 August – Birth of Wollstonecraft and Godwin's daughter, Mary Shelley, future author of Frankenstein; 10 September – Death of Mary Wollstonecraft from complications in childbirth	20 November – Publication of the first issue of the ministerial journal, the Anti-Jacobin Review; Publication of Godwin's The Enquirer; Publication of Radcliffe's novel The Italian	February – Bank of England suspends cash payments; April–June – Naval mutinies occur at Spithead and the Nore; Failure of French landing in Wales
1798	Publication of Posthumous Works of the Author of a Vindication of the Rights of Woman, edited by Godwin (pictured); Publication of Godwin's Memoirs of the Author of A Vindication of the Rights of Woman, the first biography of Wollstonecraft; Godwin's openness regarding her love affairs destroyed her reputation for a century	June – Publication of Thomas Robert Malthus's An Essay on the Principle of Population; Publication of William Wordsworth and Samuel Taylor Coleridge's poems Lyrical Ballads; Publication of Richard Lovell and Maria Edgeworth's treatise Practical Education; Publication of Smith's novel The Young Philosopher	26 May – Society of United Irishmen rebel against British rule in Ireland; August–September – French landing in Ireland; 1 August – Horatio Nelson's victory at the Battle of the Nile; Joseph Johnson and Gilbert Wakefield are imprisoned for seditious libel

== See also ==
- Timeline of the French Revolution
