= Sexual Morality (book) =

1965 book by Ronald Field Atkinson

- Title page for Sexual Morality (1965)
- Author: Ronald Field Atkinson
- Language: English
- Subject: sexual ethics
- Publisher: Hutchinson's
- Publication date: 1965
- Media type: Print (hardback, paperback)
- ISBN: 9780751201581

Sexual Morality is a 1965 book by Ronald Field Atkinson in which the author provides a critique of philosophical arguments about sex.

== Reception ==
The book was reviewed by John C. Hall, K. W. Britton and D. Storey.
