= Mary: A Fiction =

1788 novel by Mary Wollstonecraft

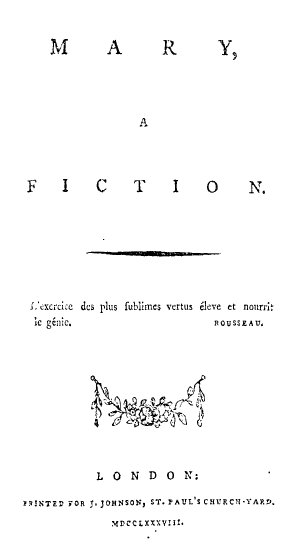
Title page from Mary: A Fiction; epigraph by Rousseau reads: "L'exercice des plus sublimes vertus éleve et nourrit le génie" ("the exercise of the most sublime virtues raises and nourishes genius")

Mary: A Fiction is the only complete novel by 18th-century British feminist Mary Wollstonecraft. It tells the tragic story of a woman's successive "romantic friendships" with a woman and a man. Composed while Wollstonecraft was a governess in Ireland, the novel was published in 1788 shortly after her summary dismissal and her decision to embark on a writing career, a precarious and disreputable profession for women in 18th-century Britain.

Inspired by Jean-Jacques Rousseau's idea that geniuses teach themselves, Wollstonecraft chose a rational, self-taught heroine, Mary, as the protagonist. Helping to redefine genius, a word which at the end of the 18th century was only beginning to take on its modern meaning of exceptional or brilliant, Wollstonecraft describes Mary as independent and capable of defining femininity and marriage for herself. According to Wollstonecraft, it is Mary's "strong, original opinions" and her resistance to "conventional wisdom" that mark her as a genius. Making her heroine a genius allowed Wollstonecraft to criticize marriage as well, as she felt geniuses were "enchained" rather than enriched by marriage.

Through this heroine Wollstonecraft also critiques 18th-century sensibility and its effects on women. Mary rewrites the traditional romance plot through its reimagination of gender relations and female sexuality. Yet, because Wollstonecraft employs the genre of sentimentalism to critique sentimentalism itself, her "fiction", as she labels it, sometimes reflects the same flaws of sentimentalism that she is attempting to expose.

Wollstonecraft later repudiated Mary, writing that it was laughable. Scholars have argued that, despite its faults, the novel's representation of an energetic, unconventional, opinionated, rational, female genius (the first of its kind in English literature) within a new kind of romance is an important development in the history of the novel because it helped shape an emerging feminist discourse.

== Plot summary ==
Mary begins with a description of the conventional and loveless marriage between the heroine's mother and father. Eliza, Mary's mother, is obsessed with novels, rarely considers anyone but herself, and favours Mary's brother. She neglects her daughter, who educates herself using only books and the natural world. Ignored by her family, Mary devotes much of her time to charity. When her brother suddenly dies, leaving Mary heir to the family's fortune, her mother finally takes an interest in her; she is taught "accomplishments", such as dancing, that will attract suitors. However, Mary's mother soon sickens and requests on her deathbed that Mary wed Charles, a wealthy man she has never met. Stunned and unable to refuse, Mary agrees. Immediately after the ceremony, Charles departs for the Continent.

To escape a family who does not share her values, Mary befriends Ann, a local girl who educates her further. Mary becomes quite attached to Ann, who is in the grip of an unrequited love and does not reciprocate Mary's feelings. Ann's family falls into poverty and is on the brink of losing their home, but Mary is able to repay their debts after her marriage to Charles gives her limited control over her money.

Ann becomes consumptive and Mary travels with her to Lisbon in hopes of nursing her back to health. There they are introduced to Henry, who is also trying to regain his health. Ann dies and Mary is grief-stricken. Henry and Mary fall in love but are forced to return to England separately. Mary, depressed by her marriage to Charles and bereft of both Ann and Henry, remains unsettled, until she hears that Henry's consumption has worsened. She rushes to his side and cares for him until he dies.

At the end of the novel, Charles returns from Europe; he and Mary establish something of a life together, but Mary is unhealthy and can barely stand to be in the same room with her husband; the last few lines of the novel imply that she will die young.

== Biographical and literary influences ==
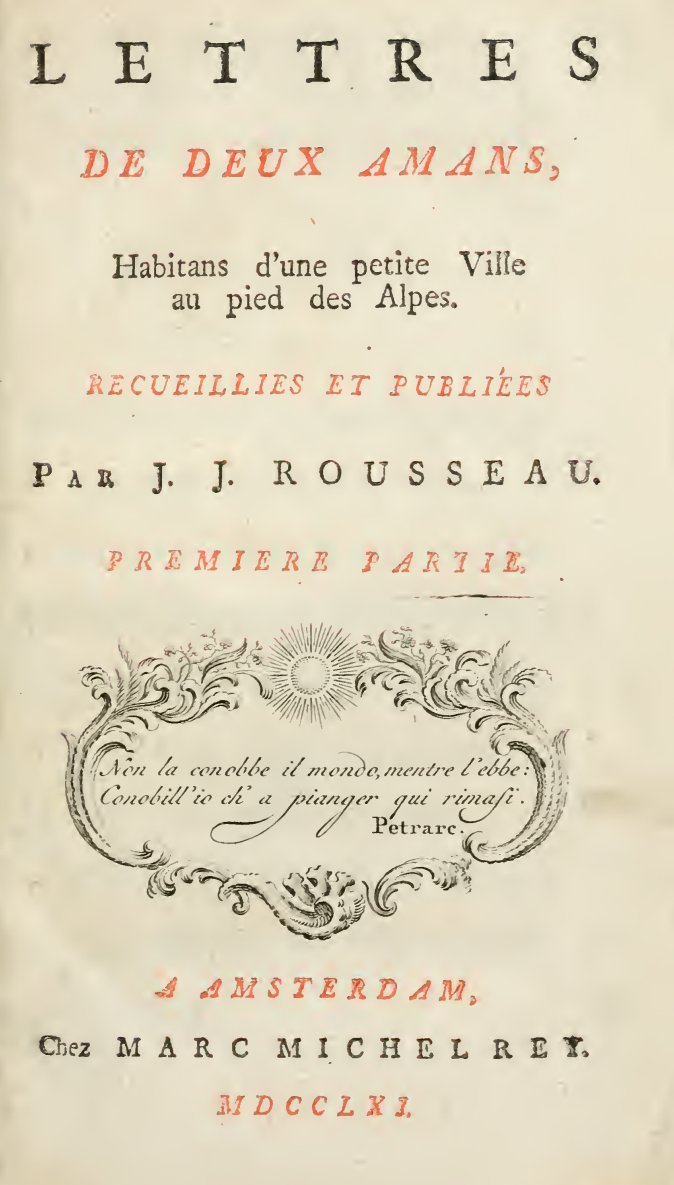
Rousseau's Julie, or the New Heloise (1761), from which Wollstonecraft drew the epigraph for Mary

Wollstonecraft wrote Mary at the town of Hotwells in Bristol while a governess for the Anglo-Irish Kingsborough family. Her relationships with the family provided fodder for the novel, a work that Wollstonecraft herself admitted was "drawn from Nature". Eliza, for example, is partially based on Lady Kingsborough, who Wollstonecraft believed cared more for her dogs than for her children. The friendship between Mary and Ann closely resembles the relationship between Wollstonecraft and her intimate companion Fanny Blood, who meant "all the world" to her and, as Wollstonecraft's husband William Godwin later put it, "for whom she contracted a friendship so fervent, as for years to have constituted the ruling passion of her mind". Wollstonecraft's representation of Fanny as Ann has been called "condescending"; critics have speculated that because Wollstonecraft felt betrayed by Fanny's decision to marry, she depicted Ann as a friend who could never satisfy the heroine.

Jean-Jacques Rousseau's philosophical treatise on education, Emile (1762), is one of the major literary influences on Mary. A few months before starting the work, Wollstonecraft wrote to her sister Everina: "I am now reading Rousseau's Emile, and love his paradoxes ... however he rambles into that chimerical world in which I have too often wandered ... He was a strange inconsistent unhappy clever creature—yet he possessed an uncommon portion of sensibility and penetration" (emphasis Wollstonecraft's). Rousseau, she notes, "chuses [sic] a common capacity to educate—and gives, as a reason, that a genius will educate itself" (emphasis Wollstonecraft's). When Mary was published, the title page included a quotation from Rousseau: "L'exercice des plus sublimes vertus éleve et nourrit le génie" ("the exercise of the most sublime virtues raises and nourishes genius"). The novel is therefore, in many ways, an early bildungsroman, or novel of education.

Wollstonecraft's epigrammatic allusion to Rousseau's Julie (1761) signifies her debt to the novel of sensibility, one of the most popular genres during the last half of the 18th century. Along with other female writers, such as Mary Hays, Helen Maria Williams, Charlotte Turner Smith, Mary Robinson, Maria Edgeworth, and Hannah More, Wollstonecraft felt compelled to respond to the Rousseauvean ideological aesthetic that had come to dominate British fiction. Romantic heroines, Wollstonecraft scholar Gary Kelly writes, "represent woman constructed for man: the heroic feminine victim of the courtly rake and gallant, the virtuous feminine companion of the ideal professionalized gentleman, and the intellectually and erotically subservient companion of the ideal bourgeois man". Wollstonecraft would also attack Rousseau in her best-known work, A Vindication of the Rights of Woman, because of his sexism in the second part of Emile. She announces in the "Advertisement" (a section similar to a preface) of Mary that she is offering her heroine, who is a "genius", as a contrast to characters such as Samuel Richardson's Clarissa and Rousseau's Sophie. In addition the text is peppered with allusions to popular sentimental novels such as The History of Eliza Warwick (1778) and The Platonic Marriage (1787), which critique their presentation of the heroine of feminine sensibility. Mary is more akin to the charitable and industrious heroines of Bluestocking Sarah Scott's Millenium Hall (1762) than to the passive, weepy heroines found in most sentimental novels. Debate concerning the relationship between gender and sensibility continued into the early 19th century; Jane Austen, for example, made it the explicit focus of her novel Sense and Sensibility (1811).

== Themes ==
As Wollstonecraft scholar Virginia Sapiro points out in her description of Mary, the novel anticipates many of the themes that would come to dominate Wollstonecraft's later writings, such as her concern with the "slavery of marriage" and the absence of any respectable occupations for women. From the beginning of her career, Wollstonecraft was concerned with how sensibility affected women as well as the perception of women in society. All of her works address these topics from one vantage point or another. Connected to this is her analysis of the legitimate and illegitimate foundations for relationships between men and women. Wollstonecraft's oeuvre is filled with continual reassessments of the definition of femininity and masculinity and the role that sensibility should fill in those definitions. In order to explore these ideas, Wollstonecraft continually turns to herself as an example (all of her works are highly autobiographical, particularly her two novels and the Letters Written in Sweden, Norway, and Denmark (1796)). As one of Wollstonecraft's first attempts to explore these questions, Mary is at times awkward and it occasionally falls short of what Gary Kelly calls the "Revolutionary feminism" of A Vindication of the Rights of Woman (1792) and Maria: or, The Wrongs of Woman (1798).

=== Sensibility and the sentimental heroine ===
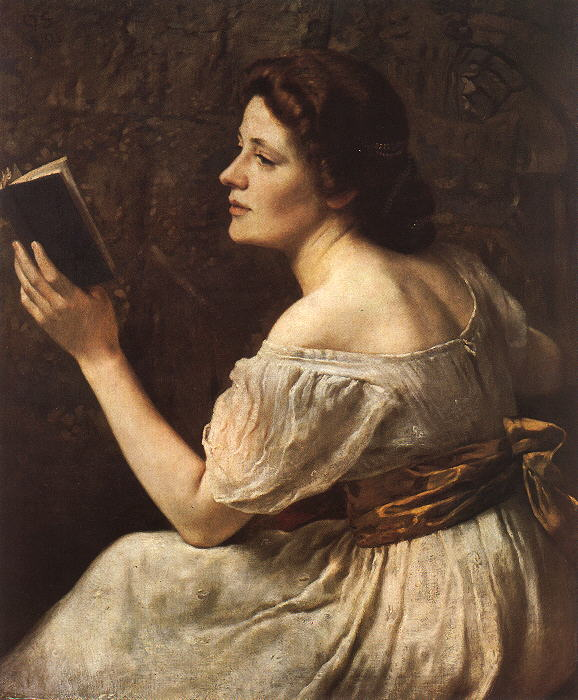
Otto Scholderer's Young Girl Reading (1883); in Mary, Wollstonecraft criticizes women who imagine themselves as sentimental heroines.

Claudia Johnson argues that Mary is "a bold and dangerous novel", because it presents a new kind of heroine, a "woman who has thinking powers" (in Wollstonecraft's words) who is also capable of having intimate relationships with both men and women. Wollstonecraft attempts to show how a gifted woman can learn to think for herself: through solitary nature walks; by reading philosophical and medical texts; by travelling; and through close friendships. Juxtaposing her new heroine with the traditional sentimental heroine, Wollstonecraft criticizes the "fatuous" and "insipid" romantic heroine. Eliza, Mary's mother, with her fondness for vacuous novels and lapdogs, embodies this type. Wollstonecraft even pokes fun at readers who expect the book to conform to their romantic expectations and desires:

If my readers would excuse the sportiveness of fancy, and give me credit for genius, I would go on and tell them such tales as would force sweet tears of sensibility to flow in copious showers down beautiful cheeks, to the discomposure of rouge, &c. &c. Nay, I would make it so interesting, that the fair peruser should beg the hair-dresser to settle the curls himself, and not interrupt her.

Mary, however, is depicted as authentic rather than artificial, detesting fashionable life rather than yearning after it. Mary's charitable works, for example, are not a passing fad: they are a heartfelt reaction to social injustice. Even though she is older and intellectual instead of young and pretty, Mary asserts her right to sexual desire rather than sublimating it.

Mary's erotic relationships with both Ann and Henry challenge traditional conceptions of the marriage plot. Most of Mary's positive attributes, such as her rationality, her ability to reject convention, and her sexuality, would have been read in the 18th century as masculine traits. Eliza, Ann, and Henry embody the feminine weakness and passivity, often associated with sentimentality, that Wollstonecraft was criticizing. Although the novel critiques sentimentality, the text appears, in the end, to be unable to resist those very conventions as Mary begins to pine for Henry. Furthermore, the book does not present an alternative way of life for women—it offers only death. Yet, at the same time, the last few lines of the novel hold out the promise of a better world "where there is neither marrying, nor giving in marriage" (emphasis Wollstonecraft's).

As literary scholar Diane Long Hoeveler has demonstrated, Mary is not only a sentimental novel, but, with its emphasis on death, hyperbolic emotion, and persecution, also a gothic novel. Hoeveler identifies in the text what she calls "Gothic feminism", an ideology that values the persecuted heroine above all: it "is not about being equal to men" but rather "about being morally superior to men. It is about being a victim". In other words, Hoeveler argues that the position of victim grants women moral authority. In a Freudian reading, she focuses on how Mary "displaces and projects her own anger and disappointment" onto other characters, such as Ann and Henry. In this interpretation, Ann and Henry become surrogate parents to Mary; she is "unable to move out of her childish identifications with parental figures, and so she just keeps constructing one parent-substitute after another, never being able to accept the demands and realities required for marriage".

==== Genre: "A Fiction" ====
Wollstonecraft's subtitle—A Fiction—explicitly rejects a number of popular 18th-century genres, such as the longer "history" or novel (Mary is substantially shorter than Richardson's Clarissa, for example). In the advertisement, she defends writing a reality-based "fiction" about a female genius:

Without arguing physically about possibilities—in a fiction, such a being may be allowed to exist; whose grandeur is drawn from the operations of its own faculties, not subjugated to opinion; but drawn by the individual from the original source. (emphasis Wollstonecraft's)

Through her choice of the subtitle "fiction", Wollstonecraft implies that other genres, such as the novel, restrict the plots available for women; she therefore attempts to invent a new genre, one that offers choice and self-confidence to female characters.

=== Love and friendship ===
One of the key differences between Wollstonecraft's novels and her philosophical treatises, as feminist critic Cora Kaplan has argued, is that her fiction celebrates female emotion and argues for its value while her treatises present emotion as "reactionary and regressive, almost counter-revolutionary". Johnson has extended this argument and contends that Wollstonecraft is interested in presenting the benefits of romantic friendship over marriage: "whereas Wollstonecraft shrinks from homosocial 'familiarity' and advocates the ennobling properties of domestic heterosexuality in Rights of Woman, her novels not only resist the heterosexual plot, but displace it with protolesbian narratives wrested from sentimentality itself." While many critics have argued that Mary "capitulates to" or "matures into" both sentimentality and heterosexuality, Johnson's interpretation has become the standard.

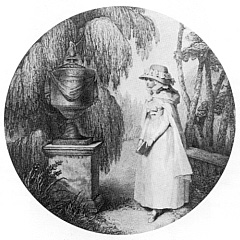
Charlotte at Werther's tomb in Goethe's The Sorrows of Young Werther (1774)

Mary's relationship with Ann challenges the definition of friendship; as Johnson explains, it "is no ordinary friendship". Mary looks to Ann, in Wollstonecraft's words, "to experience the pleasure of being beloved". Mary is "coded as masculine (agentive, sublime) while Ann is stereotypically feminine in [her] 'die-away' delicacy". This gendered divide is even reflected in Mary's choice of reading material; she reads books associated with the masculine sublime such as Edward Young's Night Thoughts (1742–45) and John Milton's Paradise Lost (1667). Although Ann does not feel the love for Mary that Mary does for her, Mary devotedly nurses Ann and is distraught by her death. The unusual intensity of this relationship is revealed in Wollstonecraft's description of Mary's sorrow:

The ladies . . . began to administer some common–place comfort, as, that it was our duty to submit to the will of Heaven, and the like trite consolations, which Mary did not answer; but waving her hand, with an air of impatience, she exclaimed, "I cannot live without her! — I have no other friend; if I lose her, what a desart [sic] will the world be to me." "No other friend," re–echoed they, "have you not a husband?"

Mary shrunk back, and was alternately pale and red. A delicate sense of propriety prevented her from replying; and recalled her bewildered reason.

Johnson cautions against labelling Mary and Ann's relationship lesbian, since the identity-defining concepts of heterosexuality and homosexuality did not exist during the 18th century; she maintains, rather, that their relationship is a bond which cannot be articulated through language. This bond is perhaps best described as erotic rather than overtly sexual. Further evidence to support such an interpretation comes from Wollstonecraft's life. Wollstonecraft based her portrait of Ann on her close friend, Fanny Blood, and when her husband, William Godwin, came to write his Memoirs of the Author of A Vindication of the Rights of Woman (1798), he described Fanny and Wollstonecraft's first meeting as similar to the one between the tortured lovers Charlotte and Werther in Goethe's sentimental novel The Sorrows of Young Werther (1774). One biographer of Wollstonecraft notes that Hester Chapone's Letters on the Improvement of the Mind, which influenced Wollstonecraft's earlier Thoughts on the Education of Daughters (1787), dedicates several chapters to these "friends of the heart"; such friendships would not have seemed unusual to 18th-century readers.

After Ann's death, Mary replaces her with Henry; as Johnson writes, "this tale of forbidden and unnarratable passionate friendship becomes a tale of forbidden but narratable adulterous love". Like Ann, Henry is a feminine counterpart to Mary's masculine persona. Mary's relationship with Henry is both erotic and paternal:

[S]he thought of him till she began to chide herself for defrauding the dead, and, determining to grieve for Ann, she dwelt on Henry's misfortune and ill health . . . she thought with rapture that there was one person in the world who had an affection for her, and that person she admired — had a friendship for. He had called her his dear girl . . . My child! His child, what an association of ideas! If I had a father, such a father! — She could not dwell on the thoughts, the wishes which obtruded themselves. Her mind was unhinged, and passion unperceived filled her whole soul.

In Johnson's interpretation, Mary does not replace Ann with a masculine lover as one might expect in a sentimental novel but rather with a "feminine", yet still acceptably male, lover.

=== Genius and the autobiographical self ===
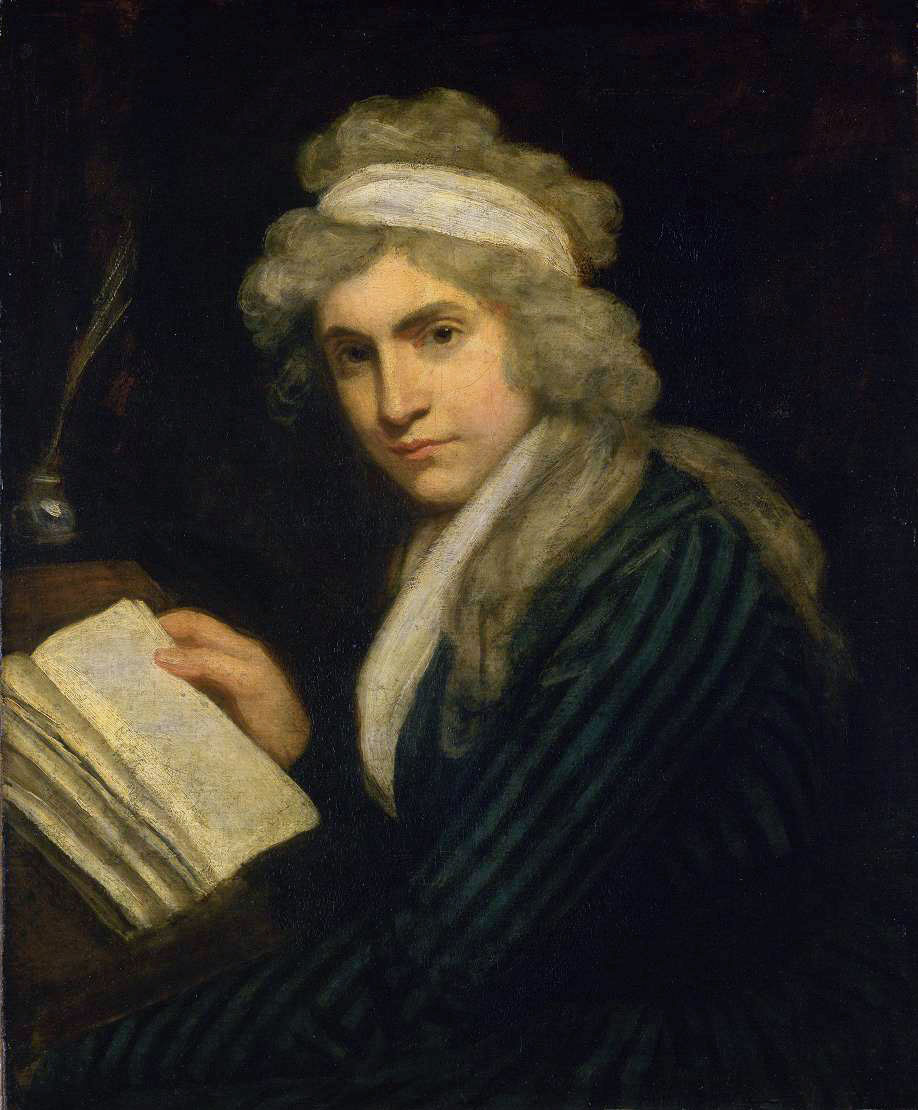
Mary Wollstonecraft by John Opie (c. 1791)

In describing her heroine, Wollstonecraft drew on the emerging 18th-century conception of the genius, a word that was slowly changing meaning from "a peculiar, distinctive, or identifying character or spirit" to "extraordinary intellectual power especially as manifested in creative activity". She offered readers the first representation of a female genius. The masculinity, particularly the "energy and decisiveness", that characterizes Mary is therefore portrayed positively and contrasted with the "passivity and sickliness" of the feminized Ann and Henry. According to Wollstonecraft, it is Mary's "strong, original opinions" and her resistance to "conventional wisdom" that mark her as a genius. Making her heroine a genius allowed Wollstonecraft to criticize marriage as well, as she felt geniuses were "enchained" rather than enriched by marriage.

Strength of mind, by which Wollstonecraft meant "the degree to which [the mind] can independently reach its own conclusions" (emphasis in original), is central to her idea of the female genius. Merely imitating others is not enough, even if one imitates the "correct" actions and thoughts. Reason, for Wollstonecraft, is what controls the emotions; without reason, she contends, people would fail to understand their own feelings. Moreover, reason allows for the distinction between a useful sensibility and a harmful sensualism. She writes: "sensibility is indeed the foundation of all our happiness; but these raptures are unknown to the depraved sensualist, who is only moved by what strikes his gross senses." Useful sensibility allows Mary to embark upon charity projects. Yet, this highly attuned sensibility separates the classes along emotional lines: only the middle-class Mary is able to understand what the poor around her require.

Wollstonecraft modelled Mary after herself, even to the point of giving the heroine her own name. Using free indirect discourse, which blurs the line between the third-person narrator and the first-person dialogue of a text, she ties the narrator's voice, which resembles the "Wollstonecraft" of the advertisement, to the heroine. This rhetorical device highlights the autobiographical elements in the story and emphasizes the reality of "the fiction".

== Reception ==
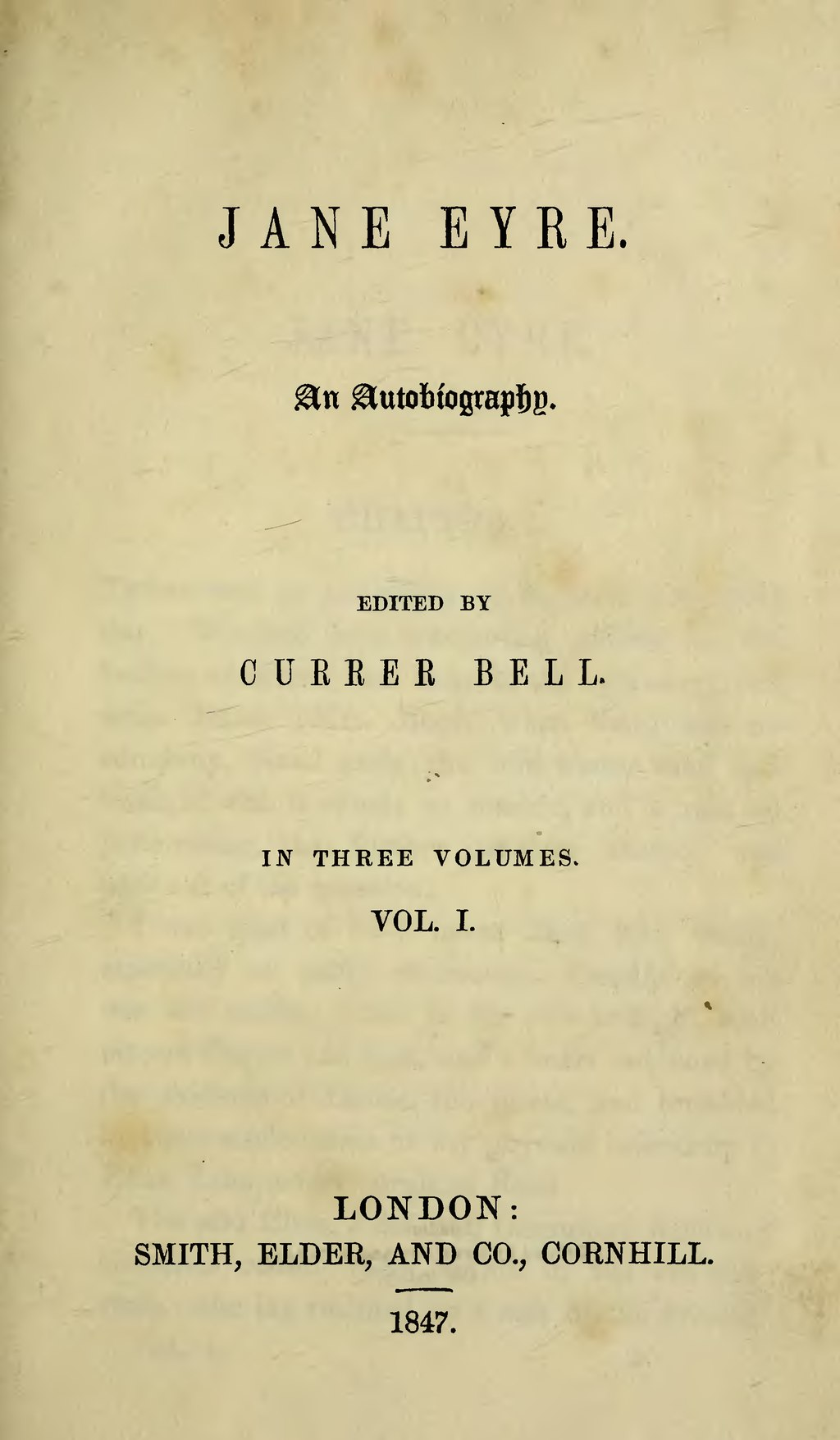
Title page from the first edition of Charlotte Brontë's Jane Eyre (1847)

Although Wollstonecraft initially felt proud of Mary, a decade after its publication she no longer believed that the work aptly demonstrated her talents as an author; she wrote to Everina in 1797: "as for my Mary, I consider it as a crude production, and do not very willingly put it in the way of people whose good opinion, as a writer, I wish for; but you may have it to make up the sum of laughter". Wollstonecraft's husband, William Godwin, disagreed, however, in his Memoirs of the Author of A Vindication of the Rights of Woman:

This little work, if Mary had never produced any thing else, would serve, with persons of true taste and sensibility, to establish the eminence of her genius. The story is nothing. He that looks into the book only for incident, will probably lay it down with disgust. But the feelings are of the truest and most exquisite class; every circumstance is adorned with that species of imagination, which enlists itself under the banners of delicacy and sentiment.

Most scholars agree with Wollstonecraft's assessment of her writing. Nevertheless, they still believe that the novel is important because it attempts to depict a liberated and reasoning female genius. As feminist scholar Mitzi Myers argues, "in her focus on the subjective vision and internal life of her heroine, in her reliance on emotional nuance rather than plot, Wollstonecraft both transforms the traditions of late eighteenth-century sentimental fiction for feminist purposes and anticipates twentieth-century trends in the novel of feminine consciousness." Mary helped initiate a tradition that would blossom in novels such as Charlotte Brontë's Jane Eyre (1847) and Villette (1853).

Published by Joseph Johnson, Mary itself was moderately successful, and sections of it were included in several collections of sentimental extracts that were popular at the time, such as The Young Gentleman and Lady's Instructor (1809). However, Johnson was still trying to sell copies of it in the 1790s and consistently listed it in the advertisements for her other works. It was not reprinted until the 1970s, when scholars became interested in Wollstonecraft and women's writing more generally.

== See also ==
- Timeline of Mary Wollstonecraft

== Modern reprints ==
- Wollstonecraft, Mary. The Complete Works of Mary Wollstonecraft. Ed. Janet Todd and Marilyn Butler. 7 vols. London: William Pickering, 1989. ISBN 0-8147-9225-1.
- Wollstonecraft, Mary. Mary and The Wrongs of Woman. Ed. Gary Kelly. Oxford: Oxford University Press. ISBN 0-19-283536-X.
- Wollstonecraft, Mary. Mary: A Fiction. Ed. Gina Luria. New York: Garland, 1974.
- Wollstonecraft, Mary. Mary; Maria; Matilda. Ed. Janet Todd. New York: New York University Press, 1992. ISBN 0-8147-9252-9

== Bibliography ==
- Elfenbein, Andrew. "Mary Wollstonecraft and the sexuality of genius". The Cambridge Companion to Mary Wollstonecraft. Ed. Claudia Johnson. Cambridge: Cambridge University Press, 2002. ISBN 0-521-78952-4.
- Godwin, William. Memoirs of the Author of A Vindication of the Rights of Woman. Eds. Pamela Clemit and Gina Luria Walker. Peterborough: Broadview Press, 2001. ISBN 1-55111-259-0.
- Hoeveler, Diane Long. "The Construction of the Female Gothic Posture: Wollstonecraft's Mary and Gothic Feminism". Gothic Studies 6.1 (2004): 30–44.
- Johnson, Claudia. Equivocal Beings: Politics, Gender and Sentimentality in the 1790s, Wollstonecraft, Radcliffe, Burney, Austen. Chicago: Chicago University Press, 1995. ISBN 0-226-40184-7.
- Johnson, Claudia. "Mary Wollstonecraft's novels". The Cambridge Companion to Mary Wollstonecraft. Ed. Claudia Johnson. Cambridge: Cambridge University Press, 2002. ISBN 0-521-78952-4.
- Kaplan, Cora. "Wild Nights: Pleasure/Sexuality/Feminism". Sea Changes: Essays on Culture and Feminism. London: Verso, 1986. ISBN 0-86091-151-9.
- Kelly, Gary. "Female Philosophy in the Bedroom: Mary Wollstonecraft and Female Sexuality". Women's Writing 4 (1997): 143–53.
- Kelly, Gary. Revolutionary Feminism: The Mind and Career of Mary Wollstonecraft. New York: St. Martin's Press, 1992. ISBN 0-312-12904-1.
- Langbauer, Laurie. "An Early Romance: Motherhood and Women's Writing in Mary Wollstonecraft's Novels". Romanticism and Feminism. Ed. Anne K. Mellor. Bloomington: Indiana University Press, 1988. ISBN 0-253-35083-2.
- Maurer, Lisa Shawn. "The Female (As) Reader: Sex, Sensibility, and the Maternal in Wollstonecraft's Fictions". Essays in Literature 19 (1992): 36–54.
- Myers, Mitzi. "Unfinished Business: Wollstonecraft's Maria". Wordsworth Circle 11.2 (1980): 107–114.
- Sapiro, Virginia. A Vindication of Political Virtue: The Political Theory of Mary Wollstonecraft. Chicago: University of Chicago Press, 1992. ISBN 0-226-73491-9.
- Spacks, Patricia Meyer. "Ev'ry Woman is at Heart a Rake". Eighteenth-Century Studies 8.1 (1974): 27–46.
- Sunstein, Emily. A Different Face: the Life of Mary Wollstonecraft. New York: Harper and Row, 1975. ISBN 0-06-014201-4.
- Tauchert, Ashley. "Escaping Discussion: Liminality and the Female-Embodied Couple in Mary Wollstonecraft's Mary, A Fiction". Romanticism on the Net 18 (May 2000). Retrieved 6 July 2007.
- Taylor, Barbara. Mary Wollstonecraft and the Feminist Imagination. Cambridge: Cambridge University Press, 2003. ISBN 0-521-66144-7.
- Todd, Janet. Mary Wollstonecraft: A Revolutionary Life. London: Weidenfeld & Nicolson, 2000. ISBN 0-297-84299-4.
- Todd, Janet. Women's Friendship in Literature. New York: Columbia University Press, 1980. ISBN 0-231-04562-X.
- Wardle, Ralph M. Mary Wollstonecraft: A Critical Biography. Lincoln: University of Nebraska Press, 1951.
