= Patrick Nowell-Smith =

Patrick H. Nowell-Smith
- Born: August 17, 1914; Polzeath
- Died: February 16, 2006 (aged 91)

Patrick Horace Nowell-Smith (born 1914, Polzeath, Cornwall, d. 2006) was a moral philosopher who taught at Leicester University, University of Kent, and York University. His 1954 book Ethics was mentioned in G. E. M. Anscombe's famous critique of consequentialism in her 1958 essay "Modern Moral Philosophy."
