= Conduct: An Introduction to Moral Philosophy =

1969 book by Ronald Field Atkinson

- Title page for Conduct: An Introduction to Moral Philosophy (1969)
- Author: Ronald Field Atkinson
- Language: English
- Subject: ethics
- Publisher: Macmillan
- Publication date: 1969
- Media type: Print
- ISBN: 9780333102404

Conduct: An Introduction to Moral Philosophy is a 1969 book by Ronald Field Atkinson in which the author tries to provide an introductory text in moral philosophy. Jonathan Gorman points out that the book restates Atkinson's view that the philosopher's task is not with matters of substance but with conceptual analysis. Richard Stanley Peters calls the book "a clear, competent and judicious introduction to moral philosophy which could be used by anyone introducing students to this subject in any course." The book has been translated into Greek and Persian.
