= Hester Chapone =

English conduct writer (1727–1801)

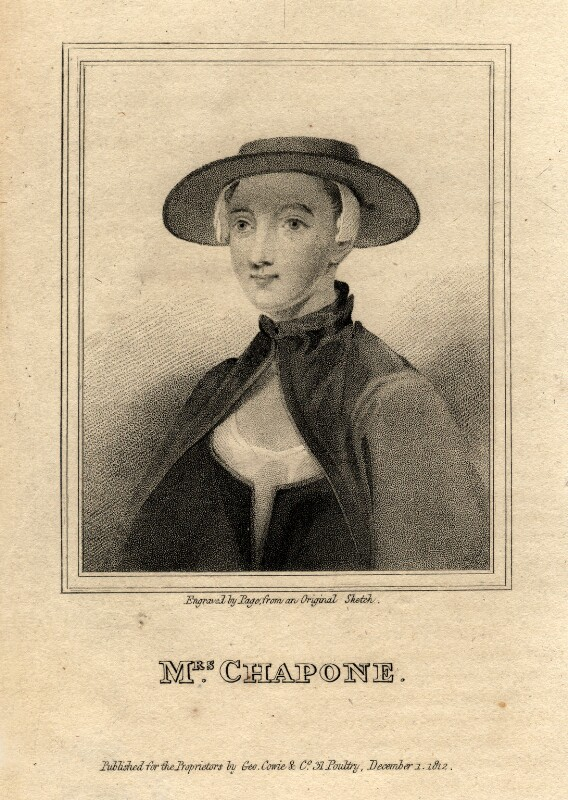
- Born: 1727; Twywell
- Died: 1801 (aged 73–74)
- Occupation: Writer
- Spouse(s): John Chapone
- Parent(s): Thomas Mulso; Hester Thomas
- Relatives: Thomas Mulso, John Mulso

Hester Chapone née Mulso (27 October 1727, in Twywell, Northamptonshire – 25 December 1801, in Hadwell, Middlesex), was an English writer of conduct books for women. She became associated with the London Blue Stockings Society.

== Life ==
Hester, the daughter of Thomas Mulso (1695–1763), a gentleman farmer, and his wife (died 1747/1748), a daughter of Colonel Thomas, wrote a romance at the age of nine entitled "The Loves of Amoret and Melissa", which earned her mother's disapproval. She was educated more thoroughly than most girls in that period, learning French, Italian and Latin, and began writing regularly and corresponding with other writers at the age of 18.

Her earliest published works were four brief pieces for Samuel Johnson's journal The Rambler in 1750. She was married in 1760 to the solicitor John Chapone (c. 1728–1761), the son of an earlier moral writer, Sarah Chapone (1699–1764), but she was soon widowed. Hester Chapone became associated with the bluestockings, the learned ladies of the Blue Stockings Society, who gathered around Elizabeth Montagu and wrote Letters on the Improvement of the Mind and Miscellanies. She died at Monken Hadley, Middlesex, on 25 December 1801.

== Conduct books ==
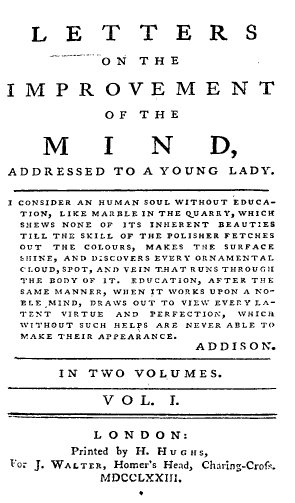
Title page from the first edition of Hester Chapone's Letters on the Improvement of the Mind (1773), one of the most popular conduct books at the time Mary Wollstonecraft was writing her first work

The Letters... were written initially for Chapone's 15-year-old niece in 1773, but by 1800 had been through at least 16 editions. A further 12 editions had appeared by 1829, at least one of them a French translation. They focused on encouraging rational understanding through the reading of the Bible, history and literature. The niece was also urged to study book-keeping, household management, botany, geology and astronomy. Only sentimental novels were to be avoided. Mary Wollstonecraft singled the book out as one of few examples of the self-improvement genre that deserved praise.

The tide of advice or conduct books in Britain reached its height between 1760 and 1820; one scholar calls the period "the age of courtesy books for women". As Nancy Armstrong writes in her Desire and Domestic Fiction (1987): "So popular did these books become that by the second half of the eighteenth century virtually everyone knew the ideal of womanhood they proposed." Chapone's is a typical example.

Conduct books picked up the styles and rhetoric of earlier genres such as devotional writings, marriage manuals, recipe books and works on household economy. They offered a description most often of the ideal woman, while handing out practical advice. Not only did they dictate morality, but they guided readers' choice of dress and outlined what was seen in the period as proper etiquette. Chapone's work in particular influenced Wollstonecraft in her composition of Thoughts, for its "sustained programme of study for women" and basis on the idea that Christianity should be "the chief instructor of our rational faculties". and on its emphasis that women should be seen as rational beings and not left to wallow in "sensualism". Wollstonecraft drew on both Chapone and Macaulay's works when she wrote A Vindication of the Rights of Woman in 1792. Another admirer, and also a personal friend, was the novelist and diarist Frances Burney. Their surviving correspondence includes a letter of condolence of 4 April 1799 from Burney to Chapone, on the death in childbirth of Jane Jeffreyes, née Mulso, the niece to whom the Letters on the Improvement of the Mind had been addressed.

== Cultural influence ==
The 19th-century novelist Elizabeth Gaskell refers to Chapone as an epistolatory model, bracketing her in Cranford with Elizabeth Carter, a much better educated Bluestocking. The book also appears in Anne Brontë's novel Agnes Grey through one of the characters, and had an influence on Samuel Richardson, Jane Austen and Mary Wollstonecraft.

In Chapter 1 of Vanity Fair, Thackeray sums up the self-image of Miss Pinkerton, proprietor of an "academy for young ladies", by describing her as "that majestic lady; the Semiramis of Hammersmith, the friend of Doctor Johnson, the correspondent of Mrs. Chapone herself"; later in the same chapter Miss Pinkerton notes that her establishment, The Mall, enjoyed "the patronage of the admirable Mrs Chapone".

Richardson and Elizabeth Carter edited a compilation of Chapone's writings entitled "The Posthumous Works of Mrs. Chapone: Containing Her Correspondence with Mr. Richardson; a Series of Letters to Mrs. Elizabeth Carter, and Some Fugitive Pieces, Never Before Published. Together with an Account of Her Life and Character, Drawn Up by Her Own Family" (1807). There, Chapone is quoted: "Though men's ways are unequal, the ways of God are equal, and with him even women shall find justice."

== Bibliography ==
- Nancy Armstrong, Desire and Domestic Fiction: A Political History of the Novel. Oxford: Oxford University Press, 1987. ISBN 0-19-506160-8
- Elizabeth Eger and Lucy Peltz, Brilliant Women: 18th-Century Bluestockings, National Portrait Gallery, London, 2008
- Kathryn Sutherland, "Writings on Education and Conduct: Arguments for Female Improvement". Women and Literature in Britain 1700–1800. Ed. Vivien Jones. Cambridge: Cambridge University Press, 2000. ISBN 0-521-58680-1
- Barbara Eaton, Yes Papa!: Mrs Chapone and the bluestocking circle; a biography of Hester Mulso – Mrs Chapone (1727–1801), a bluestocking, London: Francis Boutle Publishers, 2012, ISBN 978-1-903427-70-5
- Biography in Dictionary of National Biography
