= Conduct unbecoming (disambiguation) =

Conducting unbecoming may refer to:

- Conduct unbecoming, an offence that is subject to court martial in the armed forces of some nations
- Conduct Unbecoming (play), a 1969 play by Barry England
- Conduct Unbecoming (1975 film), a film adaptation of the play
- "Conduct Unbecoming" (Law & Order), an episode of Law & Order
- Conduct Unbecoming: Gays and Lesbians in the US Military, a 1993 book by Randy Shilts
- Episode 25 of Whatever Happened to the Likely Lads?, British TV sitcom
- Conduct Unbecoming: The Rise and Ruin of Finley, Kumble, a book by Steven Kumble about the law firm Finley, Kumble, Wagner, Underberg, Manley, Myerson & Casey
- "Conduct Unbecoming", a 2006 series of articles in the Seattle Post-Intelligencer
