= Ronald Field Atkinson =

British philosopher (1928–2005)

- Born: 1928; Leeds, England
- Died: 17 April 2005 (aged 76–77); Exeter, England

Philosophical work
- Era: 21st-century philosophy
- Region: Western philosophy
- Institutions: University of Exeter, University of York
- Main interests: moral philosophy

Ronald Field Atkinson (1928 – 17 April 2005) was a British philosopher and Professor of Philosophy at the University of Exeter and University of York.

== Books ==
- Sexual Morality (1965)
- Conduct: An Introduction to Moral Philosophy (1969)
- Knowledge and Explanation in History: An Introduction to the Philosophy of History (1978)
