= Nancy Armstrong =

American scholar, critic, and professor of English (born 1938)

Nancy Bowes Armstrong (born December 17, 1938) is a scholar, critic and professor of English at Duke University. Before moving to Duke, Armstrong was the Nancy Duke Lewis Professor of Comparative Literature, English, Modern Culture & Media, and Gender Studies at Brown University. She is currently the Gilbert, Louis & Edward Lehrman Professor of English at Duke. She is interested in eighteenth- and nineteenth-century British and American fiction, empire and sexuality, narrative and critical theory, visual culture, and scientific discourses at work in literary forms. She is best known for her book on the relationship between subjectivity and the novel, Desire and Domestic Fiction.

== Early life and education ==
Amstrong was born December 17, 1938 in New York. Armstrong received her B.A. in 1966 from the State University of New York at Buffalo and her Ph.D. from the University of Wisconsin–Madison in 1977.

== Career ==
Armstrong's most influential book is Desire and Domestic Fiction: A Political History of the Novel (Oxford University Press, 1987), a work of scholarship still relevant thirty years after its publication. As one reviewer put it, the book "changed the ways in which feminist critics of these novels saw the work these texts did; it changed the way we thought about public and private, agency and oppression, writing and action, giving us a far broader sense of the cultural work that novels do, as they translate political information into narratives about sex, gender, and desire."

Over the course of her career, Armstrong has published many books and nearly one hundred articles and chapters. Two of her recent books are How Novels Think: British Fiction and the Limits of Individualism (Columbia University Press, 2005), which is about the relationship between the formation of the modern individual and the genre of the novel, and Fiction in the Age of Photography: The Legacy of British Realism (Harvard University Press, 1999), which lays out a theory of realism that connects visual culture and fiction.

In 1992, Armstrong published, together with Leonard Tennenhouse, "a pioneer[ing] study in the field of transatlantic literary relations", The Imaginary Puritan: Literature, Intellectual Labor, and the Origins of Personal Life (University of California Press, 1992), which looks at the relationship between the author and the emerging nation-state. They later also published Novels in the Time of Democratic Writing: The American Example (University of Pennsylvania Press, 2017).

Armstrong worked on a project provisionally titled Gothic Remains. She has also been managing editor of Novel: A Forum on Fiction and co-editor of the Encyclopedia of British Literary History.

She is a past president of the Semiotic Society of America (1992).
