= Conduct book =

Genre of books

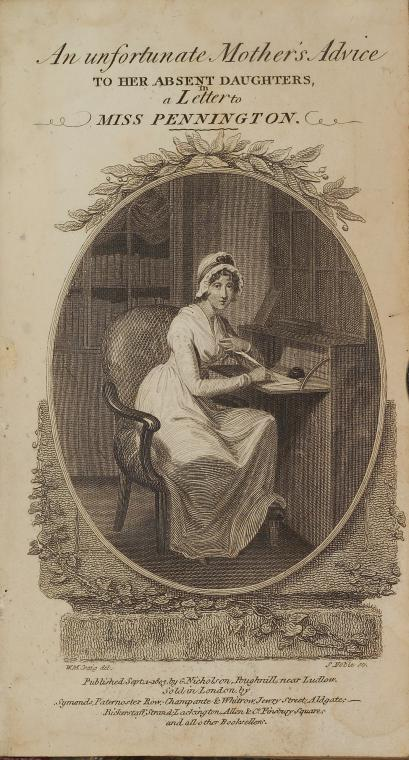
Title page of An Unfortunate Mother's Advice to Her Absent Daughters (1803), a conduct book offering moral and social guidance to young women

Conduct books or conduct literature is a genre of books that attempt to educate the reader on social norms and ideals. As a genre, they began in either the High Middle Ages or the Late Middle Ages, although antecedents such as The Maxims of Ptahhotep (c. 2350 BCE) are among the earliest surviving works. Conduct books remained popular through the 18th century, although they gradually declined with the advent of the novel.

== Overview ==
In the introduction to her bibliography of American conduct books published before 1900, Sarah E. Newton defines the conduct book as

a text that is intended for an inexperienced young adult or other youthful reader, that defines an ethical, Christian-based code of behavior, and that normally includes gender role definitions. Thus "conduct book" embraces those texts whose primary aim is to describe and define a basically Protestant scheme of life, morals, and behavior, in order to encourage ideal conduct in white, generally middle-class children, young men, or young women.

Conduct books do not deal exclusively with questions of etiquette, but rather with the conduct of one's life in a broader, ethical sense. Conduct books are typically addressed to a specific audience but also to society more broadly, and address themes including moral education and gender roles. Their tone may be both admonitory and hortatory, instructing readers both on how to behave and how not to behave.

The critic Nancy Armstrong argues that conduct books "represented a specific configuration of sexual features as those of the only appropriate woman for men at all levels of society to want as a wife", while also providing "people from diverse social groups with a basis for imagining economic interests in common." Armstrong argues that conduct books addressed readers who belonged neither to the aristocracy nor to the working class, thereby paradoxically targeting a middle class audience that did not take shape until a later period—"a middle class that was not actually there."

== Holy Roman Empire ==
In the Holy Roman Empire of the German Nation, Adolph Franz Friedrich Ludwig Freiherr Knigge wrote the book (1788) Über den Umgang mit Menschen (On Human Relations), a treatise on the fundamental principles of human relations that has the reputation of being the authoritative guide to behaviour, politeness, and etiquette in Europe. The work is more of a sociological and philosophical treatise on the basis of human relations than a how-to guide on etiquette, but the German word Knigge has come to mean 'good manners' or books on etiquette.

== United States ==
From the colonial period British and European conduct books were reprinted by American publishers and became popular; until the late 18th and early 19th centuries such imported volumes were the primary source of Americans' behavioral and moral guidance. American conduct books were addressed predominantly to middle-class readers and addressed middle-class concerns. Newton argues that these texts "reflected questions about gentility, right-doing, and manners, but more importantly questions about social identity and roles and how to live good and successful lives." A typical mid-19th-century conduct book for young women would deal with topics including women's responsibilities, domesticity and love of the home, religion, education, courtship and marriage, women's duties to their husbands and children, and "female qualities" such as cheerfulness, humility and submission; while a conduct book for young men of the same period would address themes including ambition, self-reliance, self-improvement, honesty, punctuality, choice of friends and marriage.

In her study of American conduct books published between 1830 and 1860, Jane E. Rose argues that conduct books in this period "glorify Republican Motherhood and domesticity" by characterising the home as the appropriate sphere for women, as a tool for "fostering religion, uprightness, and virtue", and as "women's empire" through which women serve the nation by raising future leaders. Topics covered by conduct books in this period "might include domestic, religious, and wifely duties; advice on health and fashion; rules for dating, mental improvement, and education; the art of conversation and avoiding 'evil-speaking' and gossiping; and advice on fostering harmonious marital relationships." Rose argues that these books, which were aimed predominantly at middle-class white women, placed "certain limitations and restrictions upon women's autonomy, literacy, and educational and vocational opportunities."

Popular 18th-century conduct books included Philip Stanhope, 4th Earl of Chesterfield's Letters to His Son (1774), John Gregory's A Father's Legacy to His Daughters (1774), Hester Chapone's Letters on the Improvement of the Mind (1773), William Kenrick's The Whole Duty of Woman (1753), and the compendium The Lady's Pocket Library (1792), published by Mathew Carey, which included selections by Hannah More, Sarah, Lady Pennington, Anne-Thérèse de Marguenat de Courcelles and Jonathan Swift. In the 19th century, popular conduct books included Henry Ward Beecher's Lectures to Young Men (1844), William Alcott's The Young Man's Guide (1834), The Young Wife, The Young Woman's Guide to Excellence, The Boy's Guide to Usefulness, and Familiar Letters to Young Men on Various Subjects, Lydia Sigourney's Moral Pieces in Prose and Verse (1815), How to Be Happy (1833) and Letters to Young Ladies (1833), Harvey Newcomb's A Practical Directory for Young Christian Females, The Young Lady's Guide to the Harmonious Development of Christian Character, How to Be a Man, Anecdotes for Girls, How to Be a Lady and Anecdotes for Boys, and Timothy Shay Arthur's Advice to Young Ladies on Their Duties and Conduct in Life (1848) and its companion volume Advice to Young Men on Their Duties and Conduct in Life (1848).

== Black conduct books in the early 20th century ==
Coming out of the American Civil War at the turn of the 20th century, conduct grew in importance among African American activists, leading to the development and popularity of black conduct books. These books, curated by select elite African American men, were designed with the intention of controlling representations of African Americans in the public sphere through the actions and image of young black girls. During the Great Migration of the early twentieth century, both physical and cultural movement of people changed the geography of social interaction within the United States, contributing to rising anxiety about national identity, socioeconomic stability, and girlhood among black and white families alike.

White supremacist literature such as The Clansman: An Historical Romance of the Ku Klux Klan (1905) contributed to the fearmongering racist ideologies of the time by relying on the false narrative that criminality is inherent to black communities. White democrats passed a series of Jim Crow laws to create a system of legal racial segregation in both public and private facilities of the south as hysteria rose among the white ruling class of both Northern and Southern states related to the safety and privilege of their race. The racial violence seen during slavery was continued through a legacy of brutality and systemic oppression, evidenced by the trend of lynching African Americans even into the twenty-first century.

In response to the violence of this period, conduct books and manuals published by black writers ushered in the era of the "New Negro," a model of moral integrity and behavioral codes that white democrats would recognize as genteel in nature. These conduct books used girls and boys as protagonists in the teaching of racial etiquette and moral refinement. Nazera Sadiq Wright, author of Black Girlhood in the Nineteenth Century, argues that black girls in literature became a rubric for African American citizenship and racial progress in print media of the 19th and early 20th century. Girls were specifically targeted in the creation and distribution of racial conduct manuals, as writers believed that black girls behavior negatively affected how the dominant culture perceived black individuals, and that this behavior resulted in serious consequences for the entire race. Books were advertised to girls and their families as a tool to help black families advance in society through the actions of their daughters, placing the future of African Americans on the shoulders of young black girls.

Black girls were made responsible for the moral, mental, and physical states of coming generations, and it was believed that their utmost responsibility was to produce superior individuals. In addition to being quiet, demure, hygienic, and apologetic, girls were also to shield themselves from unwanted advances, invest in their education, and obey their parents or husbands. "Life will be safer for the girls who understands her own nature and reverences her womanhood, who realizes her responsibility toward the race and conducts herself in accordance with that realization.". The codes published in turn-of-the-century manuals contained some information that was helpful to the health and wellbeing of young black girls; however, they also advocated for rigid rules that restricted their lives and silenced their feelings.

The ideal black girls of conduct manuals were not just dutiful and moral domestic servants, but beautiful as well. Respectability was often conflated with appearance, and conduct books instructed girls on how to present themselves both physically and socially into proper ladies, directing them towards a formulaic way of thinking that discouraged loud, uncaring, or reckless behavior in favor of quiet and thoughtful manners. Behaving like ladies was essential to their own wellbeing in society as well as the wellbeing of the race, as boisterous and unladylike conduct was believed to further stereotypes of black women as overly sexual. In contrast, the image of the proper young black girl was one of modesty and purity, aligned with the conduct and appearance of elite white girls of the time.

Narratives of black girls portrayed through conduct manuals often relied on imagery – either hand-sketches or photography – to illustrate the effects of "proper" conduct on the lives of young black women. "Before" pictures of black girls illustrated an appearance of disarray, unruliness, poor grooming, and vacancy of expression, while "after" pictures illustrated her new, bourgeoisie appearance and quiet, but intellectual, personality after receiving an upper-class education. Some of these images even made girls appear visibly lighter or Eurocentric, demonstrating that proper conduct can make girls more beautiful. These changes, which transformed lower-class black girls into the embodiment of the ideal female New Negro, prepared women for political and social activism within their communities and the domestic roles of a wife and mother, suggesting that marriage is the ultimate reward for education and cultivation.

Popular black conduct books of the early-20th century include: Floyd's Flowers, Morals and Manners, Working with Your Hands, Golden Thoughts on Chastity and Procreation, and Don't! A Book for Girls. Of these, Floyd's Flowers by Silas X. Floyd is one of the most significant, spanning several editions and publication sites to prepare readers for the "responsibilities of freedom". "Scholars consider Floyd's Flowers a 'historical rarity' and an early black textbook that taught young black readers 'conventional morality and the self-help philosophy'".

== Significance ==
Newton argues that conduct books

have promoted political ends; they have aesthetically influenced female characterization and plot development in early American as well as English novels; and they have certainly helped perpetuate traditional American views about female place and roles that emerged, in Barbara Welter's phrase, as the "Cult of True Womanhood."

Armstrong argues that because conduct books appeared to have no political bias, the rules codified in them "took on the power of natural law"; and that as a result "they presented—in actuality, still present—readers with ideology in its most powerful form." Elsewhere Armstrong and Leonard Tennenhouse argue that "Of the means which European culture has developed to create and regulate desire, conduct books for women and certain other form of writing now known as literature offer us the clearest examples", and go on to argue that "the production of specific forms of desire has created and maintained specific forms of political authority".

== See also ==
- Courtesy book
- Mirrors for princes
- Nasîhatnâme
- Self-help
- Wisdom literature

== Bibliography ==
- Literary Encyclopedia: Conduct Book
- Review of The Crisis of Courtesy: Studies in the Conduct-Book in Britain, 1600–1900 by Jacques Carre
- Armstrong, Nancy (1987). Desire and Domestic Fiction: A Political History of the Novel. Oxford University Press.
- Armstrong, Nancy; Tennenhouse, Leonard (1987). "The Literature of Conduct, the Conduct of Literature, and the Politics of Desire: An Introduction". In Armstrong, Nancy; Tennenhouse, Leonard (eds.). The Ideology of Conduct: Essays on Literature and the History of Sexuality. Methuen. pp. 1–24.
- Newton, Sarah E. (1994). Learning to Behave: A Guide to American Conduct Books Before 1900. Greenwood Press.
- Rose, Jane E. (1996). "Conduct Books for Women, 1830–1860: A Rationale for Women's Conduct and Domestic Role in America". In Hobbs, Catherine (ed.). Nineteenth-Century Women Learn to Write. University Press of Virginia. pp. 37–58.
- Wright, Nazera Sadiq (2016). Black Girlhood in the Nineteenth Century. University of Illinois Press. ISBN 9780252040573.

== Publications ==
- A Collection of Conduct Books for Girls and Boys in 19th century America in 5 vols., edited by Toshiko Nonomura. ISBN 978-4-86166-044-3
