= Letters Written in Sweden, Norway, and Denmark =

1796 travel narrative by Mary Wollstonecraft

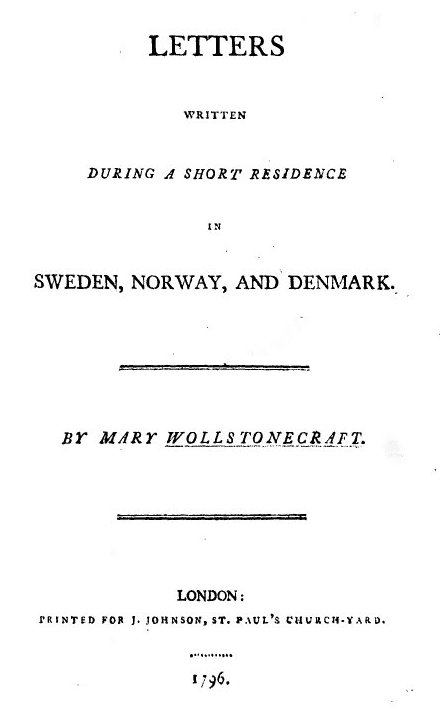
Title page from the first edition of Letters (1796)

Letters Written During a Short Residence in Sweden, Norway, and Denmark (1796) is a personal travel narrative by the eighteenth-century British feminist writer Mary Wollstonecraft. The twenty-five letters cover a wide range of topics, from sociological reflections on Scandinavia and its peoples to philosophical questions regarding identity. Published by Wollstonecraft's career-long publisher, Joseph Johnson, it was the last work issued during her lifetime.

Wollstonecraft undertook her tour of Sweden, Norway, and Denmark in order to retrieve a stolen treasure ship for her lover, Gilbert Imlay. Believing that the journey would restore their strained relationship, she eagerly set off. However, over the course of the three months she spent in Scandinavia, she realized that Imlay had no intention of renewing the relationship. The letters, which constitute the text, drawn from her journal and from missives she sent to Imlay, reflect her anger and melancholy over his repeated betrayals. Letters Written in Sweden, Norway, and Denmark is therefore both a travel narrative and an autobiographical memoir.

Using the rhetoric of the sublime, Wollstonecraft explores the relationship between self and society in the text. She values subjective experience, particularly in relation to nature; champions the liberation and education of women; and illustrates the detrimental effects of commerce on society.

Letters Written in Sweden, Norway, and Denmark was Wollstonecraft's most popular book in the 1790s—it sold well and was reviewed favorably by most critics. Wollstonecraft's future husband, philosopher William Godwin, wrote: "If ever there was a book calculated to make a man in love with its author, this appears to me to be the book." It influenced Romantic poets such as William Wordsworth and Samuel Taylor Coleridge, who drew on its themes and its aesthetic. While the book initially inspired readers to travel to Scandinavia, it failed to retain its popularity after the publication of Godwin's Memoirs of the Author of A Vindication of the Rights of Woman in 1798, which revealed Wollstonecraft's unorthodox private life.

== Biographical background ==
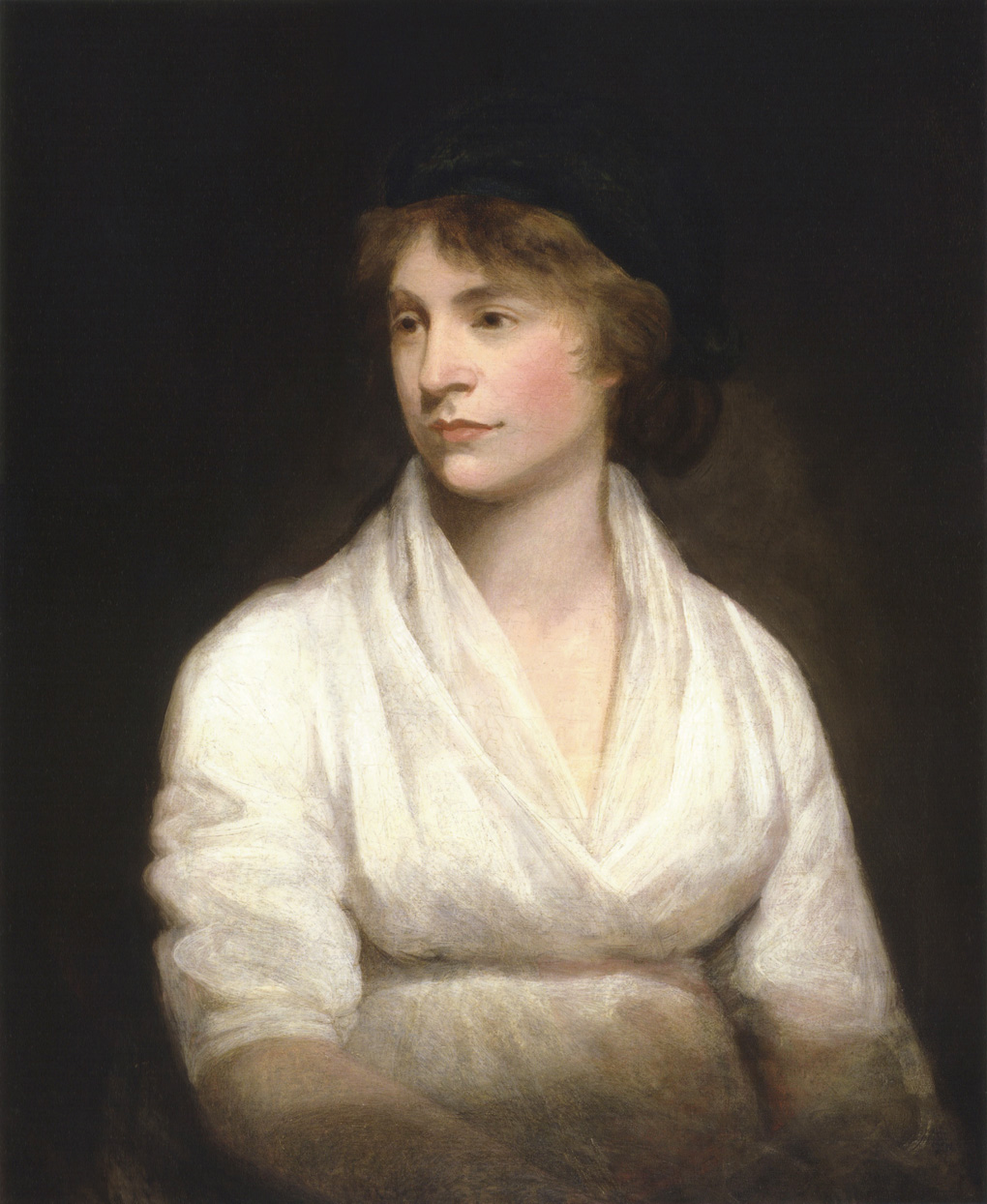
John Opie, Mary Wollstonecraft, (c. 1797)

In 1790, at the age of thirty-one, Wollstonecraft made a dramatic entrance onto the public stage with A Vindication of the Rights of Men, a work that helped propel the British pamphlet war over the French Revolution. Two years later she published what has become her most famous work, A Vindication of the Rights of Woman. Anxious to see the revolution firsthand, she moved to France for about two years, but returned in 1795 after revolutionary violence increased and the lover she met there, American adventurer Gilbert Imlay, abandoned her and their illegitimate daughter, Fanny Imlay. Shortly after her return to Britain, Wollstonecraft attempted suicide in May; Imlay, however, managed to save her.

One month after her attempted suicide, Wollstonecraft agreed to undertake the long and treacherous journey to Scandinavia in order to resolve Imlay's business difficulties. Not only was her journey to Scandinavia fraught with peril (she was a woman travelling alone during a time of war), it was also laced with sorrow and anger. While Wollstonecraft initially believed that the trip might resurrect their relationship, she eventually recognized that it was doomed, particularly after Imlay failed to meet her in Hamburg. Wollstonecraft's despair increased as her journey progressed.

On her return to Britain in September, Wollstonecraft tried to commit suicide a second time: she attempted to drown herself in the River Thames but was rescued by passersby. Letters Written in Sweden, Norway, and Denmark, which draws its material from her journal and the letters she sent Imlay during the three-month tour, was published in January 1796 by Wollstonecraft's close friend and career-long publisher, Joseph Johnson. Written after her two suicide attempts, Letters Written in Sweden, Norway, and Denmark frequently returns to the topic of death; it recreates Wollstonecraft's mental state while she was in Scandinavia and has been described as a suicide note addressed to Imlay, although he is never referred to by name in the published text. It is the last work by Wollstonecraft published within her lifetime: she died in childbirth just one year later.

=== Scandinavian journey and Imlay's business interests ===
Although Wollstonecraft appears as only a tourist in Letters Written in Sweden, Norway, and Denmark, during her travels she was actually conducting delicate business negotiations on behalf of Imlay. For almost two hundred years, it was unclear why she had travelled to Scandinavia, but in the 1980s historian Per Nyström uncovered documents in local Swedish and Norwegian archives that shed light on the purpose of her trip. He revealed that Wollstonecraft was searching for a ship and cargo that had been stolen from Imlay. Imlay had authorized her to conduct his business dealings, referring to her in legal documents as "Mrs. Mary Imlay, my best friend and wife", although the two were not married.

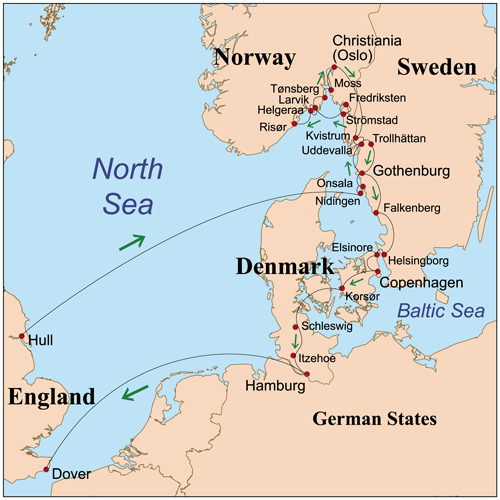
Wollstonecraft's route

The intricate details of Imlay's business dealings are laid out clearly by Nyström. On 18 June 1794, Peder Ellefsen, who belonged to a rich and influential Norwegian family, bought a ship called the Liberty from agents of Imlay in Le Havre, France. It would later become clear that Ellefsen never owned the ship but rather engaged in a pro-forma sale on behalf of Imlay. He renamed the ship the Maria and Margaretha (presumably after Mary and her maid Marguerite) and had the Danish Consulate in Le Havre certify it so that the ship could pass through the British blockade of France (Imlay was a blockade runner). Carrying silver and gold Bourbon plate, the ship sailed from France under a Danish flag and arrived at Copenhagen on 20 August 1794. Although Ellefsen supposedly ordered the ship to continue on to Gothenburg, it never reached its destination. Imlay engaged in several fruitless attempts to locate the ship and its valuable cargo and then dispatched Wollstonecraft to negotiate an agreement with Ellefsen, who had subsequently been arrested for stealing the ship and its contents. Wollstonecraft's success or failure in the negotiations is unknown as is the ultimate fate of the ship and its treasure.

To engage in these negotiations, Wollstonecraft travelled first to Gothenburg, where she remained for two weeks. Leaving Fanny and her nurse Marguerite behind, she embarked for Strömstad, Sweden, where she took a short detour to visit the fortress of Fredriksten, and then proceeded to Larvik, Norway. From there she travelled to Tønsberg, Norway, where she spent three weeks. She also visited Helgeroa, Risør, and Kristiania (now Oslo) and returned by way of Strömstad and Gothenburg, where she picked up Fanny and Marguerite again. She returned to England by way of Copenhagen and Hamburg, finally landing at Dover in September 1795, three months after she had left her home country.

== Structure, genre, and style ==
Letters Written in Sweden, Norway, and Denmark consists of twenty-five letters that address an extensive range of contentious political topics, such as prison reform, land rights, and divorce laws, as well as less controversial subjects, such as gardening, salt works, and sublime vistas. Wollstonecraft's political commentary extends the ideas she had presented in An Historical and Moral View of the French Revolution (1794); her discussion of prison reform, for example, is informed by her own experiences in revolutionary France and those of her friends, many of whom were jailed.

While at first glance Letters Written in Sweden, Norway, and Denmark appears to be a travel narrative, it is actually a "generic hybrid". The nature of this hybridity, however, is not altogether agreed upon by scholars. Some emphasize Wollstonecraft's fusion of the travelogue with the autobiography or memoir (a word used by Wollstonecraft in the book's advertisement), while others see it as a travelogue cum epistolary novel. The text, which reveals Wollstonecraft's thought processes, flows seamlessly from autobiographical reflections to musings on nature to political theories. However, it is unified by two threads: the first is Wollstonecraft's argument regarding the nature and progress of society; the second is her increasing melancholy. Although Wollstonecraft aims to write as a philosopher, the image of the suffering woman dominates the book.

=== Travel narrative: "the art of thinking" ===
One-half of the "generic hybridity" of Letters Written in Sweden, Norway, and Denmark is the epistolary travel narrative. Wollstonecraft's conception of this genre was shaped by eighteenth-century empirical and moral travel narratives, particularly Oliver Goldsmith's The Traveller, or a Prospect of Society (1764), Laurence Sterne's A Sentimental Journey Through France and Italy (1768), Samuel Johnson's A Journey to the Western Islands of Scotland (1775), James Boswell's Journal of a Tour to the Hebrides (1785), and Arthur Young's travel books.

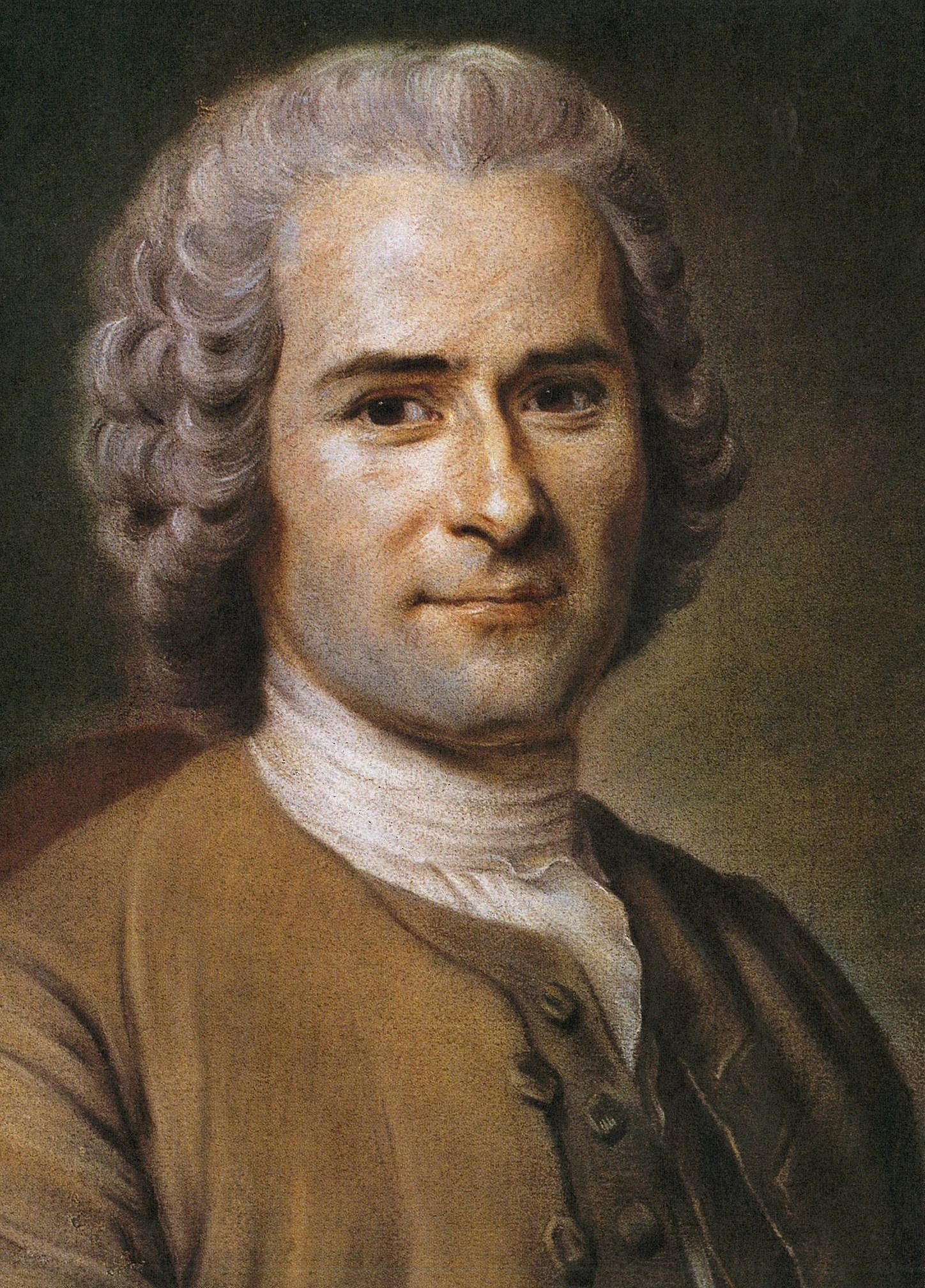
Maurice Quentin de La Tour, Rousseau,(1753)

After reviewing twenty-four travel books for Joseph Johnson's periodical, the Analytical Review, Wollstonecraft was well-versed in the genre. This extensive reading solidified her ideas of what constituted a good travel book; in one review, she maintained that travel writers should have "some decided point in view, a grand object of pursuit to concentrate their thoughts, and connect their reflections" and that their books should not be "detached observations, which no running interest, or prevailing bent in the mind of the writer rounds into a whole". Her reviews praised detailed and engaging descriptions of people and places, musings on history, and an insatiable curiosity in the traveller.

"The art of travel is only a branch of the art of thinking", Wollstonecraft wrote. Her journey and her comments on it are, therefore, not only sentimental but also philosophical. She uses the two modes to continue the critique of the roles afforded women and the progress of civilization that she had outlined in A Vindication of the Rights of Men (1790), A Vindication of the Rights of Woman (1792), and An Historical and Moral View of the French Revolution. After overturning the conventions of political and historical writing, Wollstonecraft brought what scholar Gary Kelly calls "Revolutionary feminism" to yet another genre that had typically been considered the purview of male writers, transforming the travel narrative's "blend of objective facts and individual impressions ... into a rationale for autobiographical revelation". As one editor of the Letters Written in Sweden, Norway, and Denmark writes, the book is "nothing less than a revolution in literary genres"; its sublimity, expressed through scenes of intense feeling, made "a new wildness and richness of emotional rhetoric" desirable in travel literature.

One scholar has called Wollstonecraft the "complete passionate traveler". Her desire to delve into and fully experience each moment in time was fostered by the works of Jean-Jacques Rousseau, particularly his Reveries of a Solitary Walker (1782). Several of Rousseau's themes appear in the Letters Written in Sweden, Norway, and Denmark, such as "the search for the source of human happiness, the stoic rejection of material goods, the ecstatic embrace of nature, and the essential role of sentiment in understanding". However, while Rousseau ultimately rejects society, Wollstonecraft celebrates both domesticity and industrial progress.

=== Letter ===
In one of the most influential interpretations of Letters Written in Sweden, Norway, and Denmark, Mary Favret has argued that Wollstonecraft's letters must not only be viewed as personal correspondence but also as business correspondence, a genre that would have been ideologically ambiguous for her. According to Favret, Wollstonecraft attempts to reclaim the impersonal genre of the business letter and imbue it with personal meaning. One way she does this is through extensive use of "imaginative" writing that forces the reader to become a participant in the events narrated.

Favret points out that Wollstonecraft's Letters Written in Sweden, Norway, and Denmark is quite different from the despondent and plaintive love letters she actually sent to Imlay; the travel narrative much more closely resembles the personal journal in which she recorded her thoughts regarding the people she encountered and the places she visited. While her letters to Imlay contain long passages focused almost exclusively on herself, the Letters Written in Sweden, Norway, and Denmark offers social commentary and sympathizes with the victims of disaster and injustice. To Imlay, Wollstonecraft represents herself as laid low by doubts, but to the world she depicts herself as overcoming all of these fears. She ruminates on them and transforms them into the basis of a letter akin to the open political letter popular during the last quarter of the eighteenth century, using her personal experience as the foundation for a discussion of national political reform.

=== Autobiography ===
Heavily influenced by Rousseau's frank and revealing Confessions (1782), Wollstonecraft lays bare her soul in Letters Written in Sweden, Norway, and Denmark, detailing not only her physical but also her psychological journey. Her personal disclosures, like those of other female autobiographers, are presented as "unpremeditated self-revelations" and often appear to be "circuitous". However, as Wollstonecraft scholar Mitzi Myers has made clear, Wollstonecraft manages to use this style of writing to articulate a stable and comprehensible self for the reader. Increasingly confident in her ability as a writer, she controls the narrative and its effect on readers to a degree not matched in her other works. She transforms the individual sorrows of her trip, such as the dissolution of her relationship with Imlay, into the stuff of gripping literature.

=== Sublimity ===
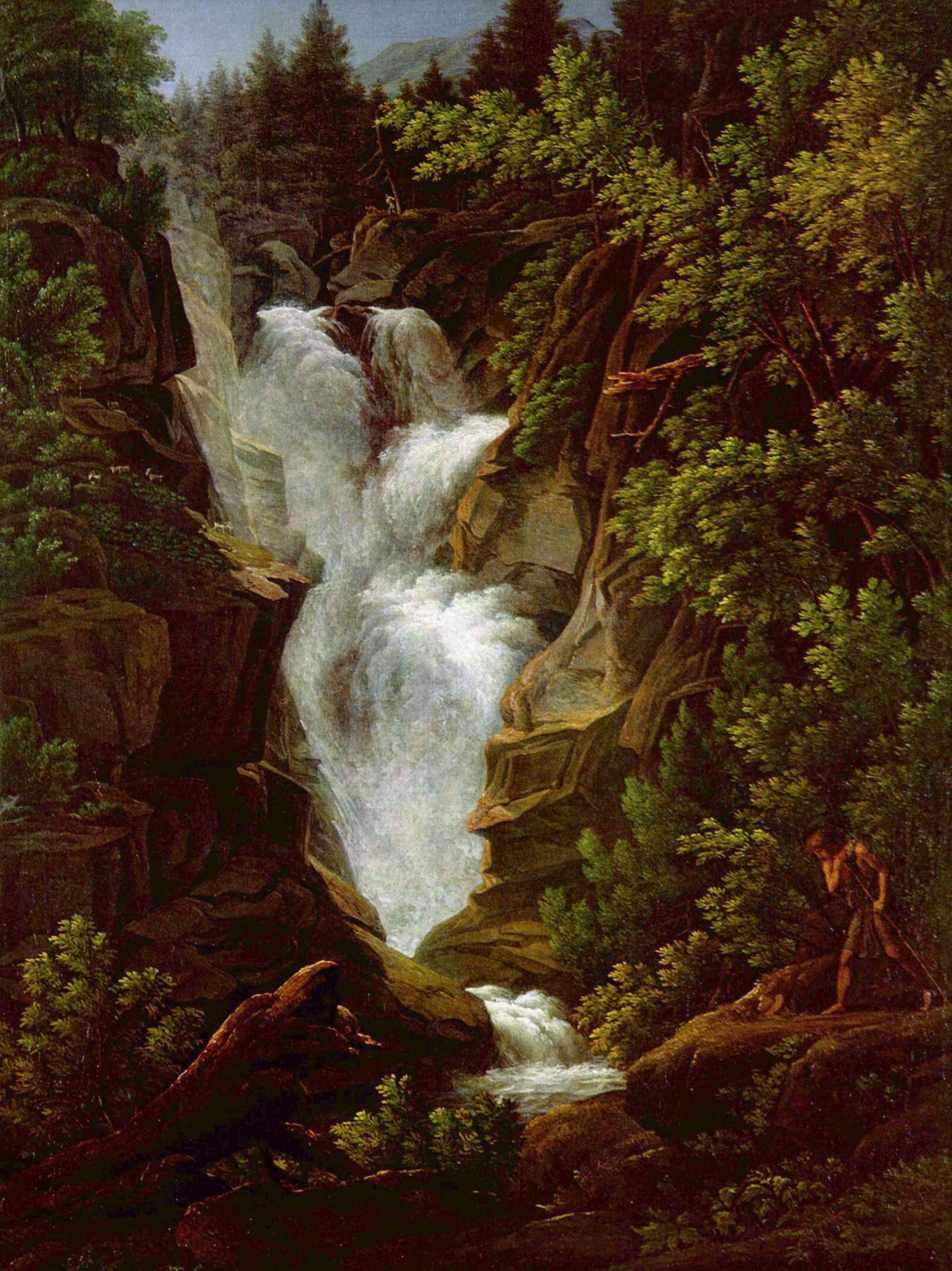
"Waterfall" by Joseph Anton Koch (1796)

Wollstonecraft relies extensively on the language of the sublime in Letters Written in Sweden, Norway, and Denmark. She draws on and redefines Edmund Burke's central terms in A Philosophical Enquiry into the Origin of Our Ideas of the Sublime and Beautiful (1757). Burke privileges the sublime (which he associates with masculinity, terror, awe, and strength) over the beautiful (which he associates with femininity, passivity, delicacy, and weakness), while Wollstonecraft ties the sublime to sterility and the beautiful to fertility. For her, the beautiful is connected to the maternal; this aesthetic shift is evident, for example, in the many passages focusing on the affectionate tie between Wollstonecraft and little Fanny, her daughter. She thus claims the feminine category of the "beautiful" for the most virtuous and useful of women: mothers.

Wollstonecraft also revises the conventional negative associations between the sublime and death; thoughts of death, prompted by a waterfall, for example, lead her to contemplate rebirth and immortality as well:

Reaching the cascade, or rather cataract, the roaring of which had a long time announced its vicinity, my soul was hurried by the falls into a new train of reflections. The impetuous dashing of the rebounding torrent from the dark cavities which mocked the exploring eye, produced an equal activity in my mind: my thoughts darted from earth to heaven, and I asked myself why I was chained to life and its misery? Still the tumultuous emotions this sublime object excited, were pleasurable; and, viewing it, my soul rose, with renewed dignity, above its cares – grasping at immortality – it seemed as impossible to stop the current of my thoughts, as of the always varying, still the same, torrent before me – I stretched out my hand to eternity, bounding over the dark speck of life to come.

Like her other manipulations of the language of the sublime, this passage is also heavily inflected by gender. As one scholar puts it, "because Wollstonecraft is a woman, and is therefore bound by the legal and social restrictions placed on her sex in the eighteenth century, she can only envisage autonomy of any form after death".

== Themes ==
=== Reason, feeling, and imagination ===
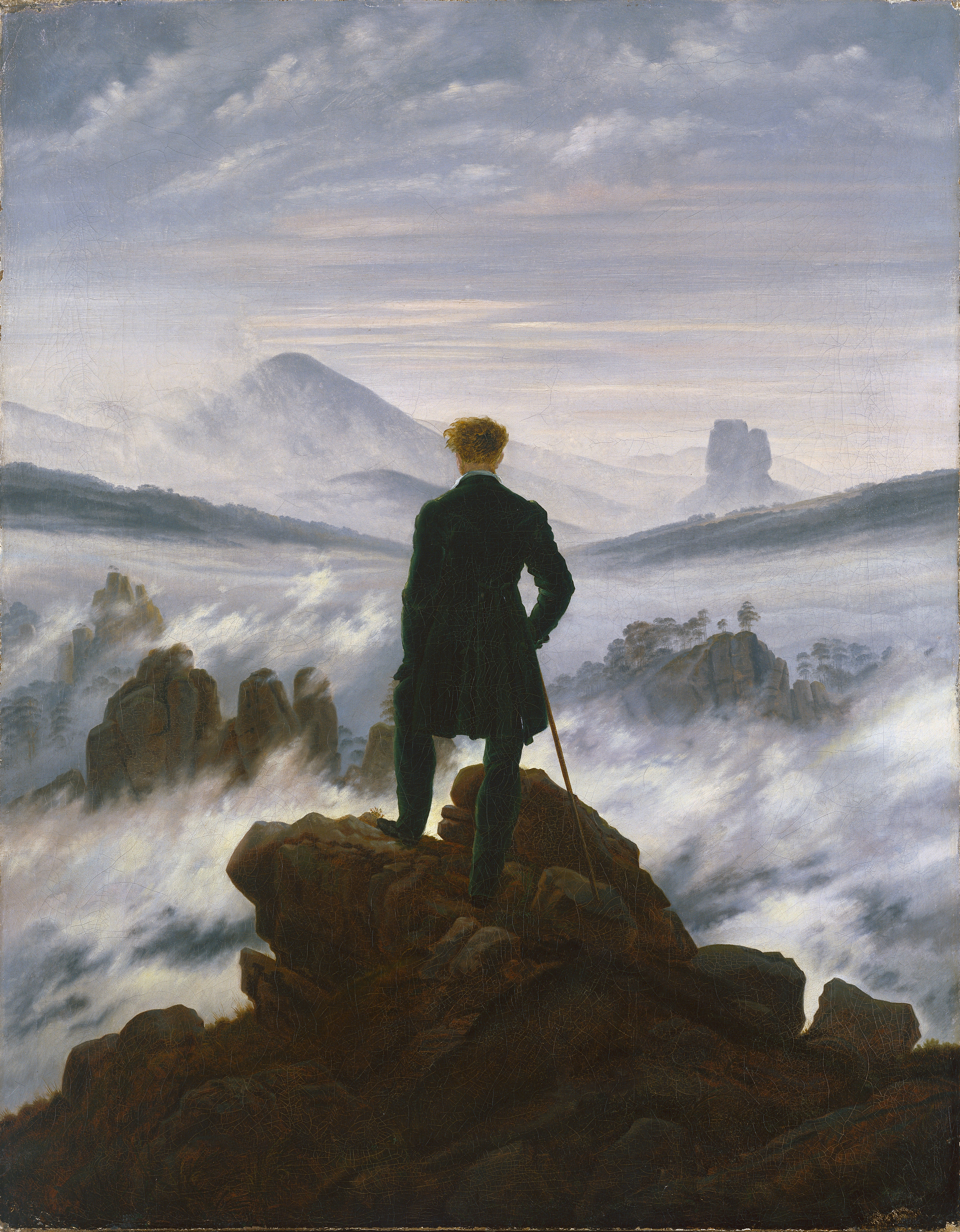
Caspar David Friedrich, Wanderer above the Sea of Fog, (1818), Kunsthalle Hamburg

Often categorized as a rationalist philosopher, Wollstonecraft demonstrates her commitment to and appreciation of feeling in Letters Written in Sweden, Norway, and Denmark. She argues that subjective experiences, such as the transcendent emotions prompted by the sublime and the beautiful, possess a value equal to the objective truths discovered through reason. In Wollstonecraft's earlier works, reason was paramount, because it allowed access to universal truths. In Letters Written in Sweden, Norway, and Denmark, however, reason serves as a tool for reflection, mediating between the sensual experiences of the world and an abstract notion of truth (not necessarily universal truth). Maturation is not only the acquisition of reason—the view Wollstonecraft had adopted in Original Stories from Real Life (1788)—but also an understanding of when and how to trust one's emotions.

Wollstonecraft's theories regarding reason, emotion, and the imagination are closely tied together. Some scholars contend that Wollstonecraft uses the imagination to liberate the self, especially the feminine self; it allows her to envision roles for women outside the traditional bounds of eighteenth-century thought and offers her a way to articulate those new ideas. In contrast, others view Wollstonecraft's emphasis on the power of the imagination as detrimental, imprisoning her in an "individualized, bourgeois desire" which can never truly embrace sociality.

Favret has argued that Wollstonecraft uses the imagination to reconcile "masculine understanding" and "female sensibility". Readers must imaginatively "work" while reading: their efforts will save them from descending into sentimentality as well as from being lured into commercial speculation. Even more importantly, readers become invested in the story of the narrator. Wollstonecraft's language demands that they participate in the "plot":

'they' rescue the writer from the villain; 'they' accompany her on her flight from sorrow ... With the readers' cooperation, the writer reverses the standard epistolary plot: here the heroine liberates herself by rejecting her correspondent and by embracing the 'world' outside of the domestic circle.

In giving the imagination the power to reshape society (a power suggested through numerous allusions to Shakespeare's The Tempest), Wollstonecraft reveals that she has become a Romantic.

=== Individual and society ===
Throughout Letters Written in Sweden, Norway, and Denmark, Wollstonecraft ponders the relationship between society and the individual. While her earlier works largely focus on society's failings and responsibilities, in this work she turns inward, explicitly arguing for the value of personal experience. In the advertisement for the work, also published as a preface, she explains her role as the "hero" of the text:

In writing these desultory letters, I found I could not avoid being continually the first person – 'the little hero of each tale.' I tried to correct this fault, if it be one, for they were designed for publication; but in proportion as I arranged my thoughts, my letter, I found, became stiff and affected: I, therefore, determined to let my remarks and reflections flow unrestrained, as I perceived that I could not give a just description of what I saw, but by relating the effect different objects had produced on my mind and feelings, whilst the impression was still fresh.

Throughout the book, Wollstonecraft ties her own psychic journey and maturation to the progress of civilizations. Nations, like individuals, she maintains have, as Wollstonecraft scholar Mary Poovey describes it, "a collective 'understanding' that evolves organically, 'ripening' gradually to fruition". However, Wollstonecraft still views civilization's tragedies as worthier of concern than individual or fictional tragedies, suggesting that, for her, sympathy is at the core of social relations:

I have then considered myself as a particle broken off from the grand mass of mankind; — I was alone, till some involuntary sympathetic emotion, like the attraction of adhesion, made me feel that I was still a part of a mighty whole, from which I could not sever myself—not, perhaps, for the reflection has been carried very far, by snapping the thread of an existence which loses its charms in proportion as the cruel experience of life stops or poisons the current of the heart.

=== Nature ===
Wollstonecraft dedicates significant portions of Letters Written in Sweden, Norway, and Denmark to descriptions of nature and her emotional responses to it. One of her most effective tactics is to associate a set of thoughts and feelings with a specific natural formation, such as the waterfall passage quoted above. Nature, Wollstonecraft assumes, is "a common reference point" between readers and herself, therefore her letters should generate a sense of social sympathy with them. Many of the letters contain these "miniature Romantic excursus" which illustrate Wollstonecraft's ideas regarding the connections between nature, God, and the self. The natural world becomes "the necessary ground of speculation and the crucial field of experience".

=== Gender: "Hapless woman! what a fate is thine!" ===
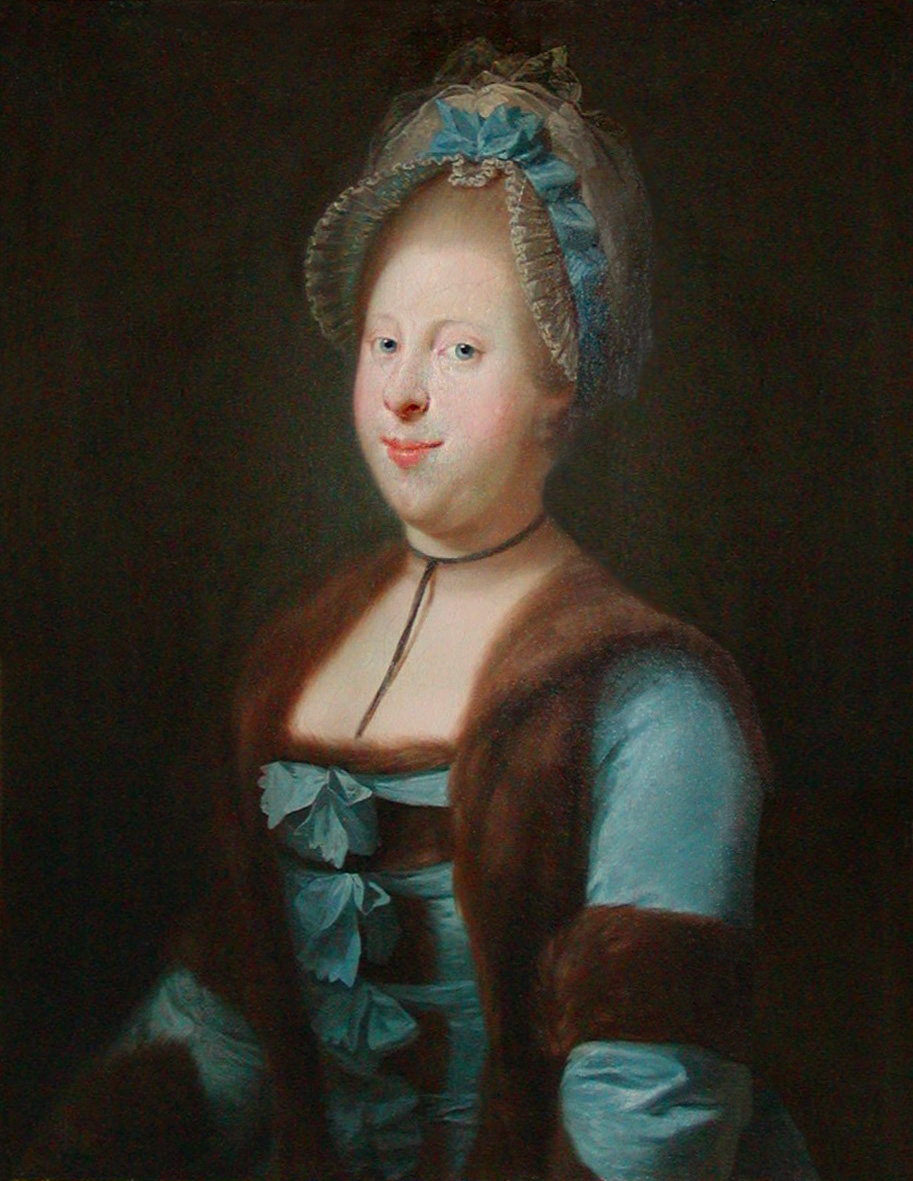
Queen Caroline of Denmark by Jens Juel (1770s)

All of Wollstonecraft's writings, including the Letters Written in Sweden, Norway, and Denmark, address the concerns of women in eighteenth-century society. As in previous works, she discusses concrete issues such as childcare and relationships with servants, but unlike her more polemical books such as Thoughts on the Education of Daughters (1787) or the Rights of Woman, this text emphasizes her emotional reactions to nature and maternity. Yet she does not depart from her interest in promoting women's education and rights. In Letter 19, the most explicitly feminist letter, Wollstonecraft anticipates readers' criticisms: "still harping on the same subject, you will exclaim – How can I avoid it, when most of the struggles of an eventful life have been occasioned by the oppressed state of my sex: we reason deeply, when we forcibly feel." Wollstonecraft comes to the realization that she has always been forced to experience the world as a woman—it is the defining feature of her sense of self.

Throughout Letters Written in Sweden, Norway, and Denmark, Wollstonecraft comments on the precarious position women occupy in society. She defends and sympathizes with Queen Caroline of Denmark, for example, who had been accused of "licentiousness" for her extra-marital affair during her marriage to the insane Christian VII. (Wollstonecraft herself had had unorthodox love affairs and an illegitimate child.) Wollstonecraft describes this royal, who was also a progressive social reformer, as a woman of courage who tried to revolutionize her country before it was prepared. Such examples fuel Wollstonecraft's increasing despair and melancholy. At one point, she laments the fate of her daughter:

You know that as a female I am particularly attached to her – I feel more than a mother's fondness and anxiety, when I reflect on the dependent and oppressed state of her sex. I dread lest she should be forced to sacrifice her heart to her principles, or principles to her heart. With trembling hand I shall cultivate sensibility, and cherish delicacy of sentiment, lest, whilst I lend fresh blushes to the rose, I sharpen the thorns that will wound the breast I would fain guard – I dread to unfold her mind, lest it should render her unfit for the world she is to inhabit – Hapless woman! what a fate is thine!

Wollstonecraft's anger and frustration over the secondary status afforded women compels her to define herself in antithesis to conventional images of femininity. In the first letter she proudly announces "at supper my host told me bluntly that I was a woman of observation, for I asked him men's questions" (emphasis Wollstonecraft's).

Wollstonecraft casts the female imagination as the productive counterpoint to destructive masculine commerce, a feat she achieves primarily through her use of the genre of the letter. While the Rights of Woman argued that women should be "useful" and "productive", importing the language of the market into the home, Letters Written in Sweden, Norway, and Denmark adopts the values of the domestic space for the larger social and political world.

=== Commercialism ===
Although Wollstonecraft spends much of Letters Written in Sweden, Norway, and Denmark musing on nature and its connection to the self, a great deal of the text is actually about the debasing effects of commerce on culture. She argues, for example, that the damage done to Hamburg and France by mercenaries and an increasingly commercial culture is far greater than the damage caused by the violence of the French Revolution, writing that "the sword has been merciful, compared with the depredations made on human life by contractors, and by the swarm of locusts who have battened on the pestilence they spread abroad". Wollstonecraft believed that commerce "embruted" the mind and fostered a selfish disposition in its practitioners. Commerce should be, she thought, "regulated by ideas of justice and fairness and directed toward the ideals of independence and benevolence".

Wollstonecraft had become disenchanted with Imlay not only because of his dismissive attitude towards her but also because of his greed. Throughout Letters Written in Sweden, Norway, and Denmark, she attaches criticisms of commerce to the anonymous lover who has betrayed her:

A man ceases to love humanity, and then individuals, as he advances in the chase after wealth; as one clashes with his interest, the other with his pleasures: to business, as it is termed, every thing must give way; nay, is sacrificed; and all the endearing charities of citizen, husband, father, brother, become empty names.

Throughout the text, she contrasts the constructive, creative imagination with destructive commerce. By associating commercialism with the anonymous lover in the text, Wollstonecraft was also directly censuring Imlay, who she believed cared more for his business speculations than for her and their child.

=== Revolution and progress ===
Wollstonecraft spends several large sections of Letters Written in Sweden, Norway, and Denmark speculating about the possibilities of social and political revolution and outlining a trajectory for the progress of civilization. In comparing Norway with Britain and France, for example, she argues that the Norwegians are more progressive because they have a free press, embrace religious toleration, distribute their land fairly, and have a politically active populace. However, her description of Norway's "golden age" becomes less rhapsodic after she discovers that the country has no universities or scientists.

In many ways Norwegian society embodied the British radical ideal of "a small-producer society, its wealth sufficiently dispersed to ensure rough equality", similar to what Wollstonecraft had outlined in A Vindication of the Rights of Men (1790). After careful consideration of how to improve the social and political problems in the places she visited, Wollstonecraft came to the conclusion that social progress must occur at a measured and "natural" rate. She argues that each country has to find its own way to improve, that democratic revolution cannot be foisted upon a people. She believed that the lower classes and the yeomen were the most promising "potential source of revolutionary social transformation". Implicit in her assessment, however, was a bourgeois condescension; she viewed the lower classes as a group separate from herself, at one point describing their behavior as "picturesque".

== Reception and legacy ==
Wollstonecraft was prompted to publish Letters Written in Sweden, Norway, and Denmark because she was heavily in debt. The successful sales of this, her most popular book in the 1790s, came at an opportune moment. Well-received by reviewers, the work was translated into German, Dutch, Swedish, and Portuguese; published in America; and reissued in a second edition in 1802.

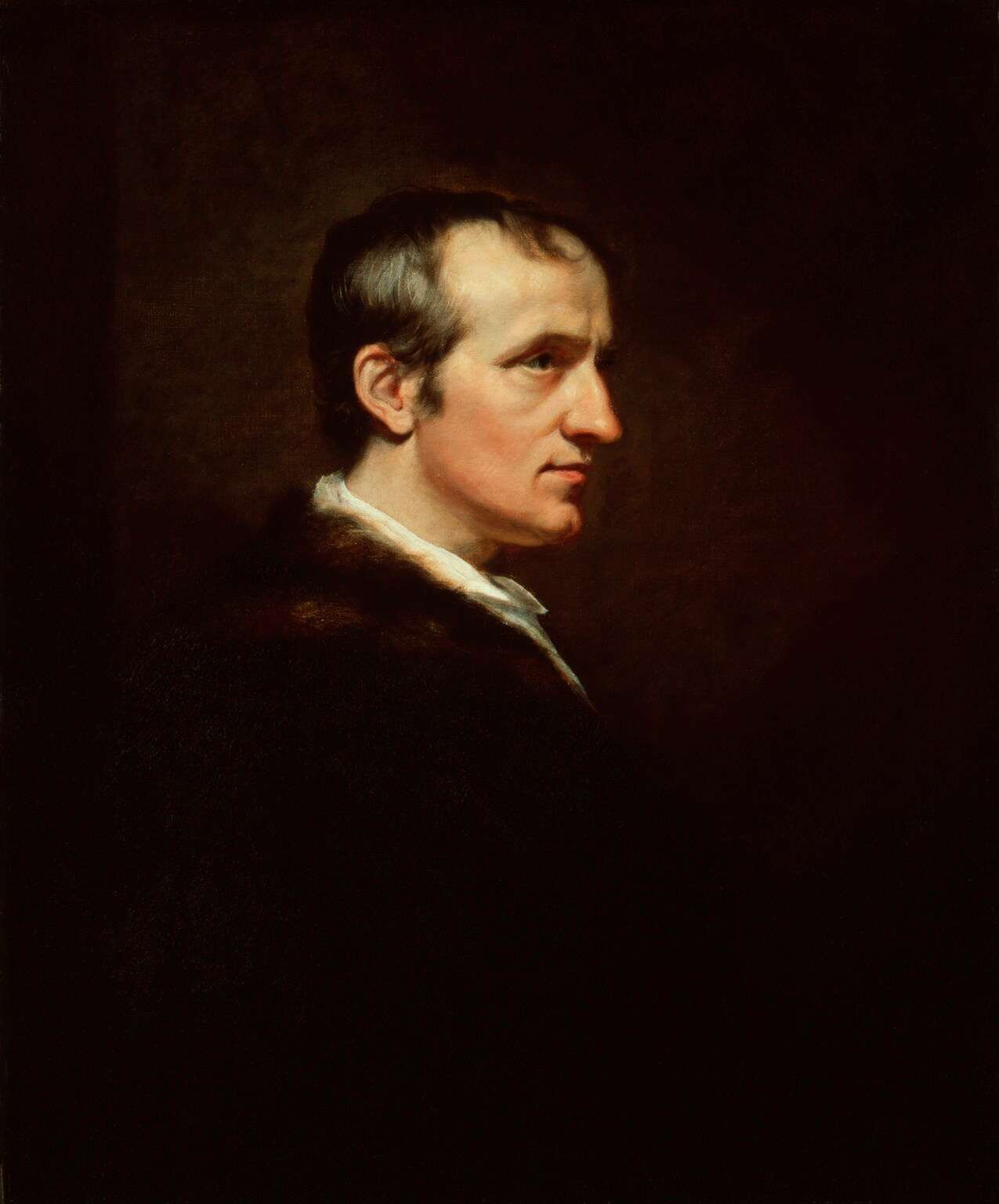
James Northcote, William Godwin, oil on canvas, 1802, the National Portrait Gallery

Amelia Alderson praised the work, separating the philosopher from the woman: "As soon as I read your Letters from Norway, the cold awe which the philosopher had excited was lost in the tender sympathy call'd forth by the woman." William Godwin, Wollstonecraft's future husband, wrote in his Memoirs of the Author of A Vindication of the Rights of Woman that reading Letters Written in Sweden, Norway, and Denmark caused him to fall in love with Wollstonecraft:

If ever there was a book calculated to make a man in love with its author, this appears to me to be the book. She speaks of her sorrows, in a way that fills us with melancholy, and dissolves us in tenderness, at the same time that she displays a genius which commands all our admiration. Affliction had tempered her heart to a softness almost more than human; and the gentleness of her spirit seems precisely to accord with all the romance of unbounded attachment.

Connecting the work to Wollstonecraft's first novel, Mary: A Fiction (1788), he celebrates its sensibility and "eroticizes the condition of feminine sorrow"; for Godwin, the work was an epistolary romance, not a work of political commentary. After Wollstonecraft's death in 1797, Godwin published her original letters to Imlay (destroying the originals in the process). He deleted all references to contemporary political events and her business negotiations, emphasizing the romantic connection between the two sets of letters. Favret contends that Godwin wanted the public to see Wollstonecraft's affair as a sentimental romance akin to that between Charlotte and Werther in Goethe's The Sorrows of Young Werther (1774).

For a woman, a one-year-old child, and a maid to travel to Scandinavia without the protection of a man was unprecedented in the eighteenth century. The book resulting from the trip also seemed highly unusual to readers at the time: details of Wollstonecraft's travels to a rarely visited area of the world, what one editor of the Letters Written in Sweden, Norway, and Denmark describes as "a boreal wilderness", intrigued and even shocked contemporary readers. The unorthodox theology of the book also alienated some readers. The Monthly Magazine and American Review wrote:

[She] discarded all faith in christianity. [sic] ... From this period she adored [God] ... not as one whose interposing power is ever silently at work on the grand theatre of human affairs, causing eventual good to spring from present evil, and permitting nothing but for wise and benevolent purposes; but merely as the first great cause and vital spring of existence.

Letters Written in Sweden, Norway, and Denmark retreated from Wollstonecraft's earlier focus on God as judge to God as mere creator, shocking some conservative readers who were not prepared to accept anything akin to deism. Worried more about Wollstonecraft's promotion of sensibility, fellow feminist and author Mary Hays criticized the book's mawkishness. A professor of moral philosophy, Thomas Brown, published a poetic response to the book, The Wanderer in Norway (1816). Rather than rejoicing in the freedom that Wollstonecraft argued the connection between nature and emotion offered, however, Brown represented her work as a failure and Wollstonecraft as a tragic victim. He read the book as a cautionary tale, whereas Wollstonecraft had intended it as a description of the possibilities of social and personal reform. As Favret argues, almost all of the responses to Letters Written in Sweden, Norway, and Denmark placed the narrator/Mary in the position of a sentimental heroine, while the text itself, with its fusion of sensibility and politics, actually does much to challenge that image.

After the publication of Godwin's Memoirs, which revealed and endorsed Wollstonecraft's love affairs and illegitimate child, her works were scorned by the majority of the public. Nevertheless, "the book was to arouse a passion for travel among cultivated people in Europe". Intrepid nineteenth-century British female travel writers such as Isabella Bird and Mary Kingsley still read it and were inspired by Wollstonecraft's pioneering efforts. Letters Written in Sweden, Norway, and Denmark was republished at the end of the nineteenth century and Robert Louis Stevenson, the author of Treasure Island, took a copy on his trip to Samoa in 1890.

Letters Written in Sweden, Norway, and Denmark was a powerful influence on Wollstonecraft's daughter, Mary Shelley. In 1817, Shelley would publish History of a Six Weeks' Tour, a narrative of her travels through Europe and to Lake Geneva which was modeled after her mother's work.

=== Romanticism ===
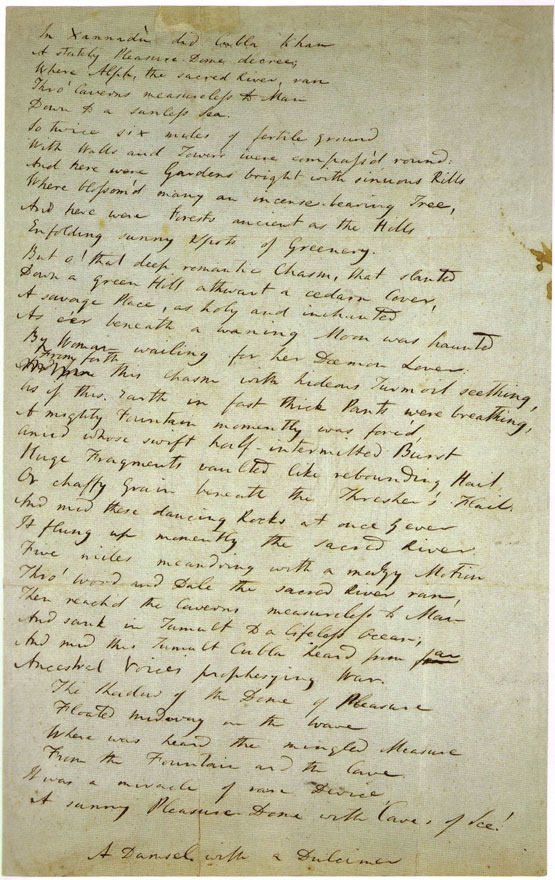
Draft of "Kubla Khan" (1797; 1816)

The Romantic poets were more profoundly affected by Letters Written in Sweden, Norway, and Denmark than anyone, except perhaps Godwin. The poet Robert Southey, for example, wrote to his publisher: "Have you met with Mary Wollstonecraft's [travel book]? She has made me in love with a cold climate, and frost and snow, with a northern moonlight." The book's combination of progressive social views with the advocacy of individual subjective experience influenced writers such as William Wordsworth and Samuel Taylor Coleridge. Wollstonecraft's "incarnational theory of the creative imagination" paved the way for Wordsworth's thorough treatment of the imagination and its relation to the self in Book V of The Prelude (1805; 1850). Her book also had a significant influence on Coleridge's Rime of the Ancient Mariner (1797–99) and Percy Shelley's Alastor (1815); their depictions of "quest[s] for a settled home" strongly resemble Wollstonecraft's. The most striking homage to Wollstonecraft's work, however, is in Coleridge's famous poem "Kubla Khan" (1797; 1816). Not only does much of his style descend from the book, but at one point he alludes to Wollstonecraft as he is describing a cold wasteland:

A savage place! as holy and enchanted
As e'er beneath a waning moon was haunted
By woman wailing for her demon-lover!

== See also ==
- Timeline of Mary Wollstonecraft

== Modern editions ==
- Wollstonecraft, Mary. The Complete Works of Mary Wollstonecraft. Ed. Janet Todd and Marilyn Butler. 7 vols. London: William Pickering, 1989. ISBN 0-8147-9225-1.
- Wollstonecraft, Mary and Godwin, William. A Short Residence in Sweden, Norway and Denmark and Memoirs of the Author of 'The Rights of Woman'. Ed. Richard Holmes. London: Penguin Books, 1987. ISBN 0-14-043269-8.
- Wollstonecraft, Mary. Letters Written during a Short Residence in Sweden, Norway, and Denmark. Ed. Carol H. Poston. Lincoln: University of Nebraska Press, 1976. ISBN 0-8032-0862-6

== Bibliography ==
- Bennett, Betty T. Mary Wollstonecraft Shelley: An Introduction. Baltimore: Johns Hopkins University Press, 1998. ISBN 0-8018-5976-X.
- Favret, Mary. Romantic Correspondence: Women, politics and the fiction of letters. Cambridge: Cambridge University Press, 1993. ISBN 0-521-41096-7.
- Furniss, Tom. "Mary Wollstonecraft's French Revolution". The Cambridge Companion to Mary Wollstonecraft Ed. Claudia L. Johnson. Cambridge: Cambridge University Press, 2002. ISBN 0-521-78952-4.
- Godwin, William. Memoirs of the Author of A Vindication of the Rights of Woman. Eds. Pamela Clemit and Gina Luria Walker. Peterborough: Broadview Press, 2001. ISBN 1-55111-259-0.
- Holmes, Richard. "Introduction". A Short Residence in Sweden, Norway and Denmark and Memoirs of the Author of A Vindication of the Rights of Woman. New York: Penguin Books, 1987. ISBN 0-14-043269-8.
- Jacobus, Mary L. "In Love With a Cold Climate: Traveling with Wollstonecraft". First Things: Reading the Maternal Imaginary. New York and London: Routledge, 1995. ISBN 0-415-90383-1.
- Jones, Chris. "Mary Wollstonecraft's Vindications and their political tradition". The Cambridge Companion to Mary Wollstonecraft Ed. Claudia L. Johnson. Cambridge: Cambridge University Press, 2002. ISBN 0-521-78952-4.
- Kaplan, Cora. "Mary Wollstonecraft's reception and legacies". The Cambridge Companion to Mary Wollstonecraft Ed. Claudia L. Johnson. Cambridge: Cambridge University Press, 2002. ISBN 0-521-78952-4.
- Kelly, Gary. Revolutionary Feminism: The Mind and Career of Mary Wollstonecraft. New York: St. Martin's, 1992. ISBN 0-312-12904-1.
- Mills, Sara. "Written on the landscape: Mary Wollstonecraft's Letters Written During a Short Residence in Sweden, Norway, and Denmark." Romantic Geographies: Discourses of Travel, 1775–1844. Ed. Amanda Gilroy. Manchester: Manchester University Press, 2000. ISBN 0-7190-5785-X.
- Moore, Jane. "Plagiarism with a Difference: Subjectivity in 'Kubla Khan' and Letters Written during a Short Residence in Sweden, Norway and Denmark". Beyond Romanticism. Ed. Stephen Copley and John Whale. London: Routledge, 1992. ISBN 0-415-05201-7.
- Moskal, Jeanne. "The Picturesque and the Affectionate in Wollstonecraft's Letters from Norway". Modern Language Quarterly 52 (1991): 263–294.
- Myers, Mitzi. "Wollstonecraft's Letters Written ... in Sweden: Towards Romantic Autobiography". Studies in Eighteenth-Century Culture 8 (1979): 165–85.
- Nyström, Per. "Mary Wollstonecraft's Scandinavian Journey". Acts of the Royal Society of Arts and Letters of Gothenburg, Humaniora 17 (1980).
- Parks, George B. "The Turn to the Romantic in the Travel Literature of the Eighteenth Century". Modern Language Quarterly 25 (1964): 22–33.
- Poovey, Mary. The Proper Lady and the Woman Writer: Ideology as Style in the Works of Mary Wollstonecraft, Mary Shelley and Jane Austen. Chicago: University of Chicago Press, 1984. ISBN 0-226-67528-9.
- Ryall, Anka and Catherine Sandbach-Dahlström. Mary Wollstonecraft's Journey to Scandinavia: Essays. Stockholm: Almqvist & Wiksell International, 2003. ISBN 91-22-02018-7.
- Sapiro, Virginia. A Vindication of Political Virtue: The Political Theory of Mary Wollstonecraft. Chicago: University of Chicago Press, 1992. ISBN 0-226-73491-9.
- Swaab, Peter. "Romantic Self-Representation: The Example of Mary Wollstonecraft's Letters in Sweden". Mortal pages, Literary Lives: Studies in Nineteenth-Century Autobiography. Ed. Vincent Newey and Philip Shaw. Aldershot: Scholar Press, 1996. ISBN 1-85928-206-7.
- Taylor, Barbara. Mary Wollstonecraft and the Feminist Imagination. Cambridge: Cambridge University Press, 2003. ISBN 0-521-66144-7.
- Todd, Janet. Mary Wollstonecraft: A Revolutionary Life. London: Weidenfeld & Nicolson, 2000. ISBN 0-231-12184-9.
