= A Vindication of the Rights of Men =

Book by Mary Wollstonecraft

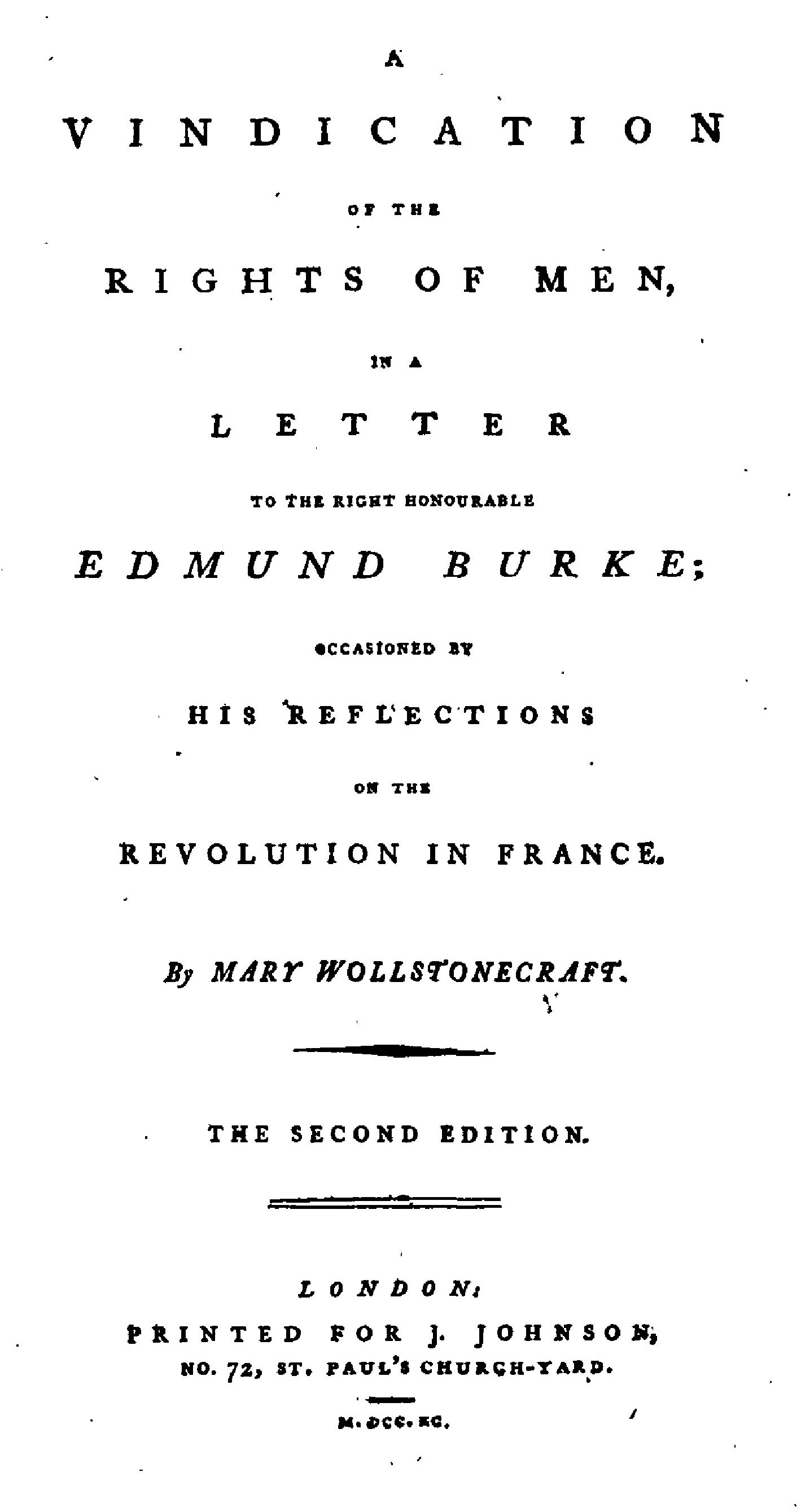
- Author: Mary Wollstonecraft
- Language: English
- Publication place: United Kingdom
- Media type: Print (Hardback)
- Text: A Vindication of the Rights of Men at Wikisource

A Vindication of the Rights of Men, in a Letter to the Right Honourable Edmund Burke; Occasioned by His Reflections on the Revolution in France (1790) is a political pamphlet, written by the 18th-century British writer and women's rights advocate Mary Wollstonecraft, which attacks aristocracy and advocates republicanism. Wollstonecraft's was the first response in a pamphlet war sparked by the publication of Edmund Burke's Reflections on the Revolution in France (1790), a defense of constitutional monarchy, aristocracy, and the Church of England.

Wollstonecraft attacked not only hereditary privilege, but also the rhetoric that Burke used to defend it. Most of Burke's detractors deplored what they viewed as his theatrical pity for Marie Antoinette, but Wollstonecraft was unique in her love of Burke's gendered language. By saying the sublime and the beautiful, terms first established by Burke himself in A Philosophical Enquiry into the Origin of Our Ideas of the Sublime and Beautiful (1756), she kept his rhetoric as well as his argument. In her first unabashedly feminist critique, which Wollstonecraft scholar Claudia Johnson describes as unsurpassed in its argumentative force, Wollstonecraft indicts Burke's justification of an equal society founded on the passivity of women.

In her arguments for republican virtue, Wollstonecraft invokes an emerging middle-class ethos in opposition to what she views as the vice-ridden aristocratic code of manners. Driven by an Enlightenment belief in progress, she derides Burke for relying on tradition and custom. She describes an idyllic country life in which each family has a farm sufficient for its needs. Wollstonecraft contrasts her utopian picture of society, drawn with what she claims is genuine feeling, with Burke's false theatrical tableaux.

The Rights of Men was successful: it was reviewed by every major periodical of the day and the first edition, published anonymously, sold out in three weeks. However, upon the publication of the second edition (the first to carry Wollstonecraft's name on the title page), the reviews began to evaluate the text not only as a political pamphlet but also as the work of a female writer. Most contrasted Wollstonecraft's "passion" with Burke's "reason" and spoke condescendingly of the text and its female author, though others were sympathetic. This remained the prevailing analysis of the Rights of Men until the 1970s, when feminist scholars revisited Wollstonecraft's texts and endeavoured to bring greater attention to their intellectualism.

== Historical context ==
=== Revolution Controversy ===
Tennis Court Oath (1791) by Jacques-Louis David

A Vindication of the Rights of Men was written against the backdrop of the French Revolution and the debates that it provoked in Britain. In a lively and sometimes vicious pamphlet war, now referred to as the Revolution Controversy, which lasted from 1789 until the end of 1795, British political commentators argued over the validity of monarchy. Alfred Cobban has called this debate "perhaps the last real discussion of the fundamentals of politics in [Britain]". The power of popular agitation in revolutionary France, demonstrated in events such as the Tennis Court Oath and the storming of the Bastille in 1789, reinvigorated the British reform movement, which had been largely moribund for a decade. Efforts to reform the British electoral system and to distribute the seats in the House of Commons more equitably were revived.

Much of the vigorous political debate in the 1790s was sparked by the publication of Edmund Burke's Reflections on the Revolution in France in November 1790. Most commentators in Britain expected Burke to support the French revolutionaries, because he had previously been part of the liberal Whig party, a critic of monarchical power, a supporter of the American revolutionaries, and a prosecutor of poor governance in India. When he didn’t do so, it shocked the populace and angered his friends and supporters. Burke's book, despite being priced at an expensive three shillings, sold an astonishing 30,000 copies in two years. Thomas Paine's famous response, The Rights of Man (1792), which became the rallying cry for thousands, however, greatly surpassed it, selling upwards of 200,000 copies.

Wollstonecraft's Rights of Men was published only weeks after Burke's Reflections. While Burke supported aristocracy, monarchy, and the Established Church, liberals such as William Godwin, Paine, and Wollstonecraft, argued for republicanism, agrarian socialism, anarchy, and religious toleration. Most of those who came to be called radicals supported similar aims: individual liberties and civic virtue. They were also united in the same broad criticisms: opposition to the bellicose "landed interest" and its role in government corruption, and opposition to a monarchy and aristocracy who they believed were unlawfully seizing the people's power.

1792 was the "annus mirabilis of eighteenth-century radicalism": its most important texts were published and the influence of radical associations, such as the London Corresponding Society (LCS) and the Society for Constitutional Information (SCI), was at its height. However, it was not until these middle- and working-class groups formed an alliance with the genteel Society of the Friends of the People that the government became concerned. After this alliance was formed, the conservative-dominated government prohibited seditious writings. Over 100 prosecutions for sedition took place in the 1790s alone, a dramatic increase from previous decades. The British government, fearing an uprising similar to the French Revolution, took even more drastic steps to quash the radicals: they made ever more political arrests and infiltrated radical groups; they threatened to "revoke the licences of publicans who continued to host politicised debating societies and to carry reformist literature"; they seized the mail of "suspected dissidents"; they supported groups that disrupted radical events; and they attacked Dissidents in the press. Radicals saw this period, which included the 1794 Treason Trials, as "the institution of a system of TERROR, almost as hideous in its features, almost as gigantic in its stature, and infinitely more pernicious in its tendency, than France ever knew."

When, in October 1795, crowds threw refuse at George III and insulted him, demanding a cessation of the war with France and lower bread prices, Parliament immediately passed the "gagging acts" (the Seditious Meetings Act and the Treasonable Practices Act, also known as the "Two Acts"). Under these new laws, it was almost impossible to hold public meetings and speech was severely curtailed at those that were held. British radicalism was effectively muted during the later 1790s and 1800s. It was not until the next generation that any real reform could be enacted.

=== Burke's Reflections ===
Published partially in response to Dissenting clergyman Richard Price's sermon celebrating the French revolution, A Discourse on the Love of Our Country, Burke used the device of a mock-letter to a young Frenchman's plea for guidance in order to defend aristocratic government, paternalism, loyalty, chivalry, and primogeniture.

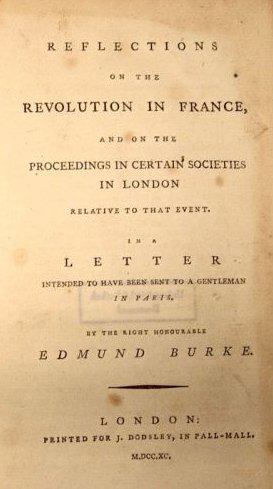
Title page from Burke's Reflections on the Revolution in France (1790)

Burke criticizes many British thinkers and writers who welcomed the early stages of the French Revolution. While the radicals likened the revolution to Britain's own Glorious Revolution in 1688, which had restricted the powers of the monarchy, Burke argues that the appropriate historical analogy was the English Civil War (1642–1651), in which Charles I had been executed in 1649. At the time Burke was writing, however, there had been very little revolutionary violence; more concerned with persuading his readers than informing them, he greatly exaggerated this element of the revolution in his text for rhetorical effect. In his Enquiry into the Sublime and Beautiful, he had argued that "large inexact notions convey ideas best", and to generate fear in the reader, in Reflections he constructs the set-piece of Louis XVI and Marie Antoinette forced from their palace at sword point. When the violence actually escalated in France in 1793 with the Reign of Terror, Burke was viewed as a prophet.

Burke also criticizes the learning associated with the French philosophes; he maintains that new ideas should not, in an imitation of the emerging discipline of science, be tested on society in an effort to improve it, but that populations should rely on custom and tradition to guide them.

=== Composition and publication of the Rights of Men ===
In the advertisement printed at the beginning of the Rights of Men, Wollstonecraft describes how and why she wrote it:

MR. BURKE'S Reflections on the French Revolution first engaged my attention as the transient topic of the day; and reading it more for amusement than information, my indignation was roused by the sophistical arguments, that every moment crossed me, in the questionable shape of natural feelings and common sense.

Many pages of the following letter were the effusions of the moment; but, swelling imperceptibly to a considerable size, the idea was suggested of publishing a short vindication of the Rights of Men.

Not having leisure or patience to follow this desultory writer through all the devious tracks in which his fancy has started fresh game, I have confined my strictures, in a great measure, to the grand principles at which he has levelled many ingenious arguments in a very specious garb.

So the pamphlet could be published as soon as she finished writing it, Wollstonecraft wrote frantically while her publisher Joseph Johnson printed the pages. In fact, Godwin's Memoirs of Wollstonecraft tells that the sheets of manuscript were delivered to the press as they were written. Halfway through the work, however, she ceased writing. One biographer describes it as a "loss of nerve"; Godwin, in his Memoirs, describes it as "a temporary fit of torpor and indolence". Johnson, perhaps canny enough at this point in their friendship to know how to encourage her, agreed to dispose of the book and told her not to worry about it. Ashamed, she rushed to finish.

Wollstonecraft's Rights of Men was published anonymously on 29 November 1790, the first of between fifty and seventy responses to Burke by various authors. Only three weeks later, on 18 December, a second edition, with her name printed on the title page, was issued. Wollstonecraft took time to edit the second edition, which, according to biographer Emily Sunstein, "sharpened her personal attack on Burke" and changed much of the text from first person to third person; "she also added a non-partisan code criticising hypocritical liberals who talk equality but scrape before the powers that be."

== Structure and major arguments ==
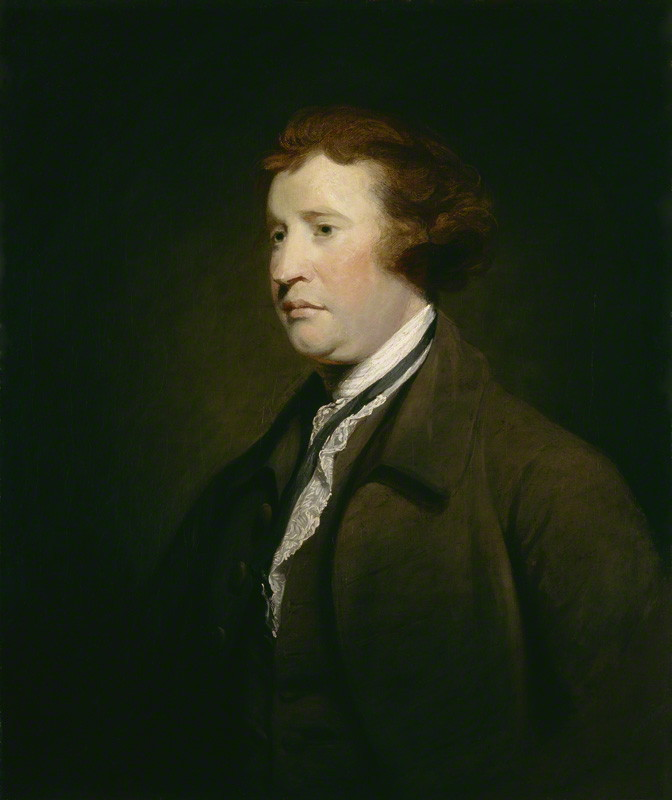
Edmund Burke, painted by the studio of Sir Joshua Reynolds (1771)

Until the 1970s, the Rights of Men was typically considered disorganized, incoherent, illogical, and replete with ad hominem attacks (such as the suggestion that Burke would have promoted the crucifixion of Christ if he were a Jew). It had been touted as an example of "feminine" emotion tilting at "masculine" reason. However, since the 1970s scholars have challenged this view, arguing that Wollstonecraft employed 18th-century modes of writing, such as the digression, to great rhetorical effect. More importantly, as scholar Mitzi Myers argues, "Wollstonecraft is virtually alone among those who answered Burke in eschewing a narrowly political approach for a wide-ranging critique of the foundation of the Reflections." Wollstonecraft makes a primarily moral argument; her "polemic is not a confutation of Burke's political theories, but an exposure of the cruel inequities which those theories presuppose." Wollstonecraft's style was also a deliberate choice, enabling her to respond to Burke's Enquiry into the Sublime and Beautiful as well as to Reflections.

The style of the Rights of Men mirrors much of Burke's own text. It has no clear structure; like Reflections, the text follows the mental associations made by the author as she was writing. Wollstonecraft's political treatise is written, like Burke's, in the form of a letter: his to C. J. F. DePont, a young Frenchman, and hers to Burke himself. Using the same form, metaphors, and style as Burke, she turns his own argument back on him. The Rights of Men is as much about language and argumentation as it is about political theory; in fact, Wollstonecraft claims that these are inseparable. She advocates, as one scholar writes, "simplicity and honesty of expression, and argument employing reason rather than eloquence." At the beginning of the pamphlet, she appeals to Burke: "Quitting now the flowers of rhetoric, let us, Sir, reason together."

The Rights of Men does not aim to present a fully articulated alternative political theory to Burke's, but instead to demonstrate the weaknesses and contradictions in his own argument. Therefore, much of the text is focused on Burke's logical inconsistencies, such as his support of the American revolution and the Regency Bill (which proposed restricting monarchical power during George III's madness in 1788), in contrast to his lack of support for the French revolutionaries. In criticism of Burke's contradictory support of the Regency Bill along with supporting the rule of monarchy in France, she writes:

You were so eager to taste the sweets of power, that you could not wait till time had determined, whether a dreadful delirium would settle into a confirmed madness; but, prying into the secrets of Omnipotence, you thundered out that God had hurled him from his throne, and that it was the most insulting mockery to recollect that he had been a king, or treat him with any particular respect on account of his former dignity…. I have, Sir, been reading, with a scrutinizing, comparative eye, several of your insensible and profane speeches during the King's illness. I disdain to take advantage of a man's weak side, or draw consequences from an unguarded transport—A lion preys not on carcasses! [emphasis Wollstonecraft's]

Wollstonecraft's goal, she writes, is "to shew you [Burke] to yourself, stripped of the gorgeous drapery in which you have enwrapped your tyrannic principles." However, she does also gesture towards a larger argument of her own, focusing on the inequalities faced by British citizens because of the class system. As Wollstonecraft scholar Barbara Taylor writes, "treating Burke as a representative spokesman for old-regime despotism, Wollstonecraft champions the reformist initiatives of the new French government against his 'rusty, baneful opinions', and censures British political elites for their opulence, corruption, and inhumane treatment of the poor."

== Political theory ==
=== Attack against rank and privilege ===
Wollstonecraft's attack on rank and hierarchy dominates the Rights of Men. She chastises Burke for his contempt for the people, whom he dismisses as the "swinish multitude", and berates him for supporting the elite, most notably Marie Antoinette. In a famous passage, Burke had written: "I had thought ten thousand swords must have leaped from their scabbards to avenge even a look that threatened her with insult.—But the age of chivalry is gone."

Contrasting her middle-class values against Burke's aristocratic ones, Wollstonecraft contends that people should be judged on their merits rather than on their birthrights. As Wollstonecraft scholar Janet Todd writes, "the vision of society revealed [in] A Vindication of the Rights of Men was one of talents, where entrepreneurial, unprivileged children could compete on equal terms with the now wrongly privileged." Wollstonecraft emphasizes the benefits of hard work, self-discipline, frugality, and morality, values she contrasts with the "vices of the rich", such as "insincerity" and the "want of natural affections". She endorses a commercial society that would help individuals discover their own potential as well as force them to realize their civic responsibilities. For her, commercialism would be the great equalizing force.

While Dissenting clergyman Richard Price, whose sermon A Discourse on the Love of Our Country helped spark Burke's work, is the villain of Reflections, he is the hero of the Rights of Men. Both Wollstonecraft and Burke associate him with Enlightenment thinking, particularly the notion that civilization could progress through rational debate, but they interpret that stance differently. Burke believed such relentless questioning would lead to anarchy, while Wollstonecraft connected Price with "reason, liberty, free discussion, mental superiority, the improving exercise of the mind, moral excellence, active benevolence, orientation toward the present and future, and the rejection of power and riches"—quintessential middle-class professional values.

Wollstonecraft wields the English philosopher John Locke's definition of property (that is, ownership acquired through labour) against Burke's notion of inherited wealth. She contends that inheritance is one of the major impediments to the progress of European civilization, and repeatedly argues that Britain's problems are rooted in the inequity of property distribution. Although she did not advocate a totally equal distribution of wealth, she did desire one that was more equitable.

=== Republicanism ===
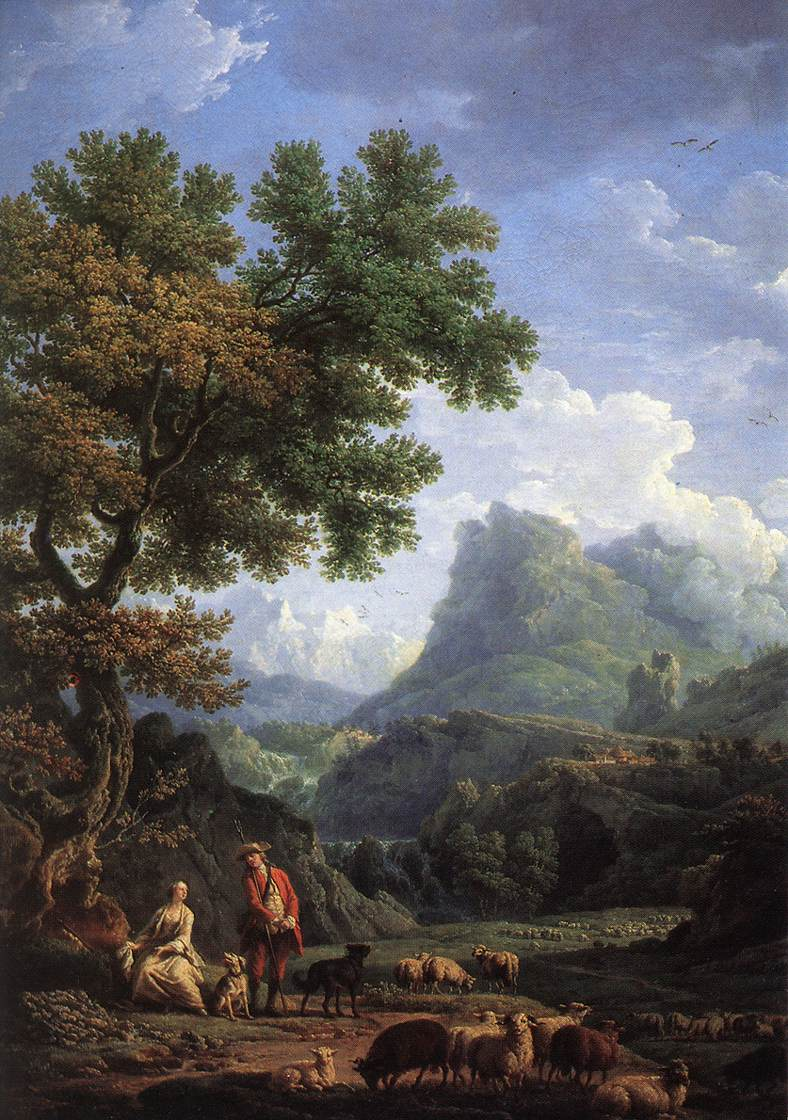
Shepherd in the Alps by Claude Joseph Vernet; an idyllic rural life is part of the political utopia Wollstonecraft depicts in the Rights of Men.

The Rights of Men indicts monarchy and hereditary distinctions and promotes a republican ideology. Relying on 17th- and early 18th-century notions of republicanism, Wollstonecraft maintains that virtue is at the core of citizenship. However, her notion of virtue is more individualistic and moralistic than traditional Commonwealth ideology. The goals of Wollstonecraft's republicanism are the happiness and prosperity of the individual, not the greatest good for the greatest number or the greatest benefits for the propertied. While she emphasizes the benefits that will accrue to the individual under republicanism, she also maintains that reform can only be effected at a societal level. This marks a change from her earlier texts, such as Original Stories from Real Life (1788), in which the individual plays the primary role in social reform.

Wollstonecraft's ideas of virtue revolved around the family, distinguishing her from other republicans such as Francis Hutcheson and William Godwin. For Wollstonecraft, virtue begins in the home: private virtues are the foundation for public virtues. Inspired by Jean-Jacques Rousseau's depictions of the ideal family and the republican Swiss canton, she draws a picture of idyllic family life in a small country village. One scholar describes her plan this way: "vast estates would be divided into small farms, cottagers would be allowed to make enclosures from the commons and, instead of alms being given to the poor, they would be given the means to independence and self-advancement."

=== Tradition versus revolution ===
One of the central arguments of Wollstonecraft's Rights of Men is that rights should be conferred because they are reasonable and just, not because they are traditional. While Burke argued that civil society and government should rely on traditions which had accrued over centuries, Wollstonecraft contends that all civil agreements are subject to rational reassessment. Precedence, she maintains, is no reason to accept a law or a constitution. As one scholar puts it, "Burke's belief in the antiquity of the British constitution and the impossibility of improvement upon a system that has been tried and tested through time is dismissed as nonsense. The past, for Wollstonecraft, is a scene of superstition, oppression, and ignorance." Wollstonecraft believed powerfully in the Enlightenment notion of progress, and rejected the contention that ancient ideas could not be improved upon. Using Burke's own architectural language, she asks, "why was it a duty to repair an ancient castle, built in barbarous ages, of Gothic materials?" She also notes, pointedly, that Burke's philosophy condones slavery:

[T]he whole tenor of his plausible arguments settles slavery on an everlasting foundation. Allowing his servile reverence for antiquity, and prudent attention to self-interest, to have the force which he insists on, the slave trade ought never to be abolished; and, because our ignorant forefathers, not understanding the native dignity of man, sanctioned a traffic that outrages every suggestion of reason and religion, we are to submit to the inhuman custom, and term an atrocious insult to humanity the love of our country, and a proper submission to the laws by which our property is secured.—Security of property! Behold, in a few words, the definition of English liberty. And to this selfish principle every nobler one is sacrificed.

== Sensibility ==
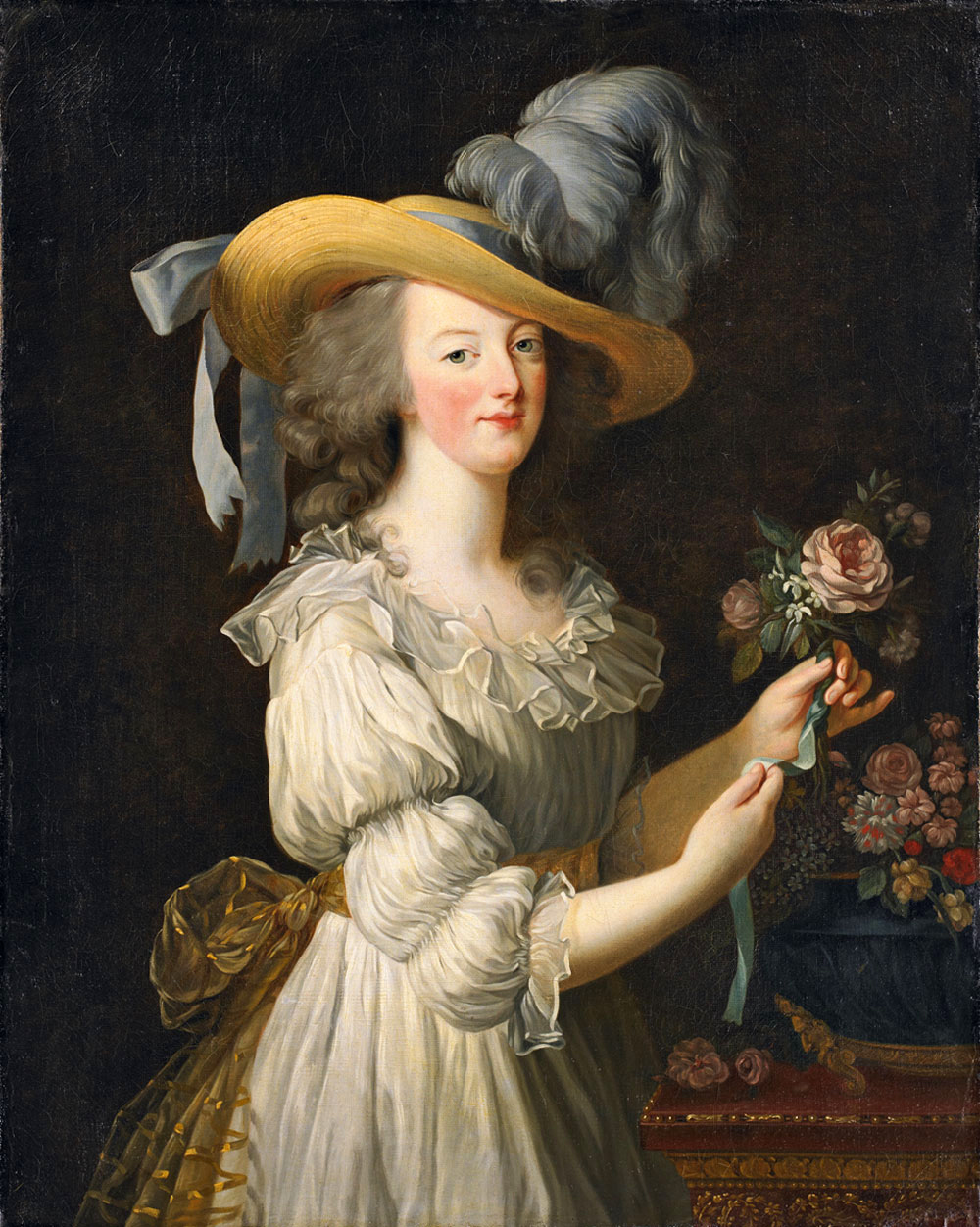
Marie Antoinette, painted by Élisabeth-Louise Vigée-Le Brun (1783); Wollstonecraft attacks Burke for his self-indulgent sympathy for the French queen.

In the Rights of Men, Wollstonecraft not only endorses republicanism, but also a social contract based on sympathy and fellow-feeling. She describes the ideal society in these terms: individuals, supported by cohesive families, connect with others through rational sympathy. Strongly influenced by Price, whom she had met at Newington Green just a few years earlier, Wollstonecraft asserts that people should strive to imitate God by practicing universal benevolence.

Embracing a reasoned sensibility, Wollstonecraft contrasts her theory of civil society with Burke's, which she describes as full of pomp and circumstance and riddled with prejudice. She attacks what she perceives as Burke's false feeling, countering with her own genuine emotion. She argues that to be sympathetic to the French revolution (i.e., the people) is humane while to sympathize with the French clergy, as Burke does, is a mark of inhumanity. She accuses Burke not only of insincerity, but also of manipulation, claiming that his Reflections is propaganda. In one of the most dramatic moments of the Rights of Men, Wollstonecraft claims to be moved beyond Burke's tears for Marie Antoinette and the monarchy of France to silence for the injustice suffered by slaves, a silence she represents with dashes meant to express feelings more authentic than Burke's:

Man preys on man; and you mourn for the idle tapestry that decorated a gothic pile, and the dronish bell that summoned the fat priest to prayer. You mourn for the empty pageant of a name, when slavery flaps her wing, and the sick heart retires to die in lonely wilds, far from the abodes of men....Why is our fancy to be appalled by terrific perspectives of a hell beyond the grave?—Hell stalks abroad;—the lash resounds on the slave's naked sides; and the sick wretch, who can no longer earn the sour bread of unremitting labour, steals to a ditch to bid the world a long good night—or, neglected in some ostentatious hospital, breathes his last amidst the laugh of mercenary attendants.

Such misery demands more than tears—I pause to recollect myself; and smother the contempt I feel rising for your rhetorical flourishes and infantine sensibility.

---------------

---------------

== Gender and aesthetics ==
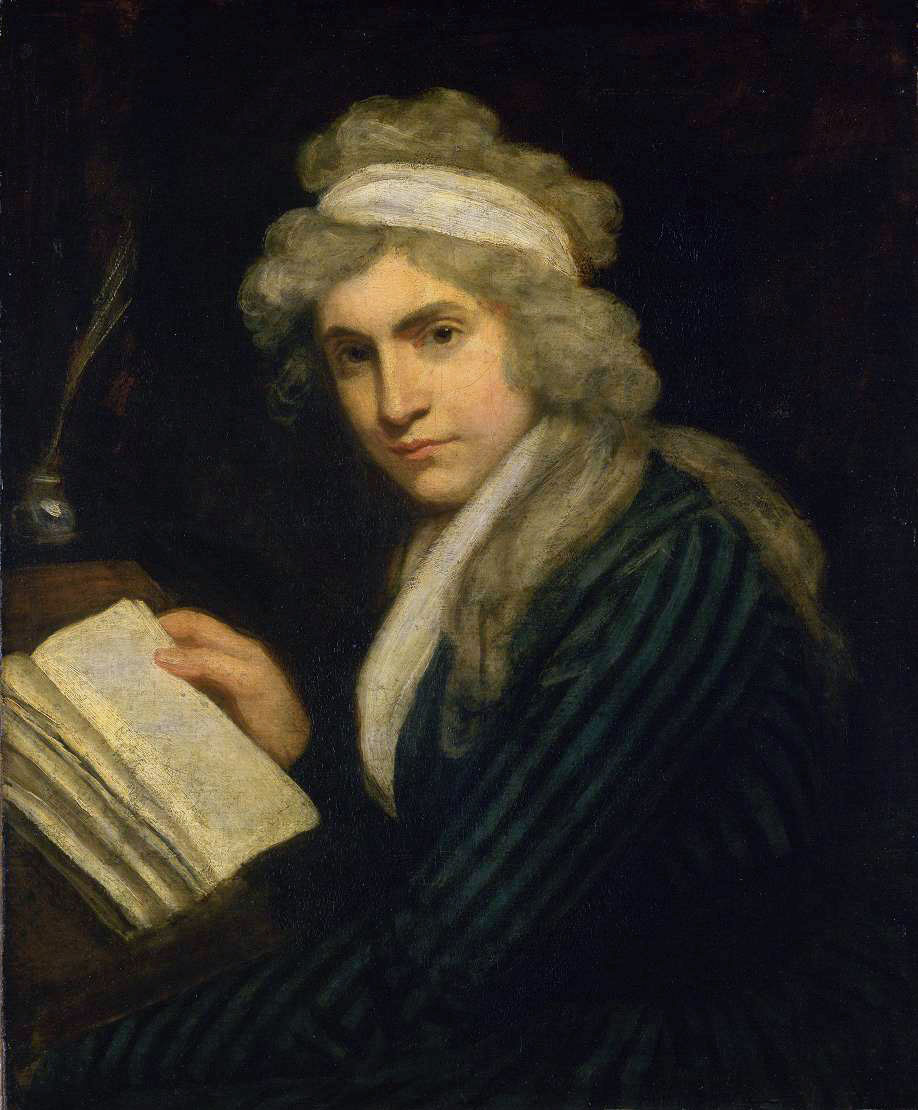
Mary Wollstonecraft, painted by John Opie (c. 1791)

In the Rights of Men, Wollstonecraft challenges Burke's rhetoric as much as, or more, than his political theory. She begins by redefining the sublime and the beautiful, terms he had established in his Enquiry into the Sublime and Beautiful. While Burke associates the beautiful with weakness and femininity, and the sublime with strength and masculinity, Wollstonecraft writes, "for truth, in morals, has ever appeared to me the essence of the sublime; and, in taste, simplicity the only criterion of the beautiful." With this sentence, she calls into question Burke's gendered definitions; convinced that they are harmful, she argues later in the Rights of Men:

You may have convinced [women] that littleness and weakness are the very essence of beauty; and that the Supreme Being, in giving women beauty in the most supereminent [sic] degree, seemed to command them, by the powerful voice of Nature, not to cultivate the moral virtues that might chance to excite respect, and interfere with the pleasing sensations they were created to inspire. Thus confining truth, fortitude, and humanity, within the rigid pale of manly morals, they might justly argue, that to be loved, woman's high end and great distinction! they should 'learn to lisp, to totter in their walk, and nick-name God's creatures.' Never, they might repeat after you, was any man, much less a woman, rendered amiable by the force of those exalted qualities, fortitude, justice, wisdom, and truth; and thus forewarned of the sacrifice they must make to those austere, unnatural virtues, they would be authorised to turn all their attention to their persons, systematically neglecting morals to secure beauty.

As Wollstonecraft scholar Claudia Johnson has written, "As feminist critique, these passages have never really been surpassed." Burke, Wollstonecraft maintains, describes womanly virtue as weakness, thus leaving women no substantive roles in the public sphere and relegating them to uselessness.

Wollstonecraft applies this feminist critique to Burke's language throughout the Reflections. As Johnson argues, "her pamphlet as a whole refutes the Burkean axiom 'to make us love our country, our country ought to be lovely'"; Wollstonecraft successfully challenges Burke's rhetoric of the beautiful with the rhetoric of the rational. She also demonstrates how Burke embodies the worst of his own ideas. He becomes the hysterical, illogical, feminine writer, and Wollstonecraft becomes the rational, masculine writer. Ironically, in order to effect this transposition, Wollstonecraft herself becomes passionate at times, for example, in her description of slavery (quoted above).

== Reception and legacy ==
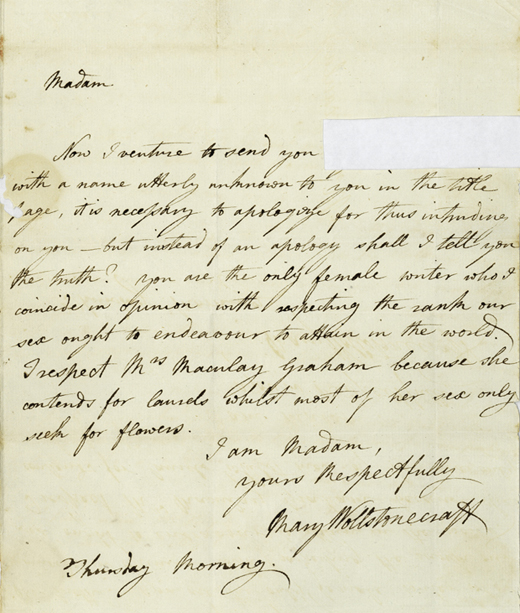
Letter sent by Wollstonecraft to Catharine Macaulay along with a copy of the Rights of Men

The Rights of Men was successful, its price contributing in no small measure: at one shilling and sixpence it was half the price of Burke's book. After the first edition sold out, Wollstonecraft agreed to have her name printed on the title page of the second. It was her first extensive work as "a self-supporting professional and self-proclaimed intellectual", as scholar Mary Poovey writes, and:

took the form that most people would have considered the least appropriate for a woman—the political disquisition. Requiring knowledge of government (in which women had no share), analytical ability (of which women theoretically had little), and the ambition to participate directly in contemporary events (of which women were supposed to have none), political disquisition was in every sense a masculine domain.

Commentaries from the time note this; Horace Walpole, for example, called her a "hyena in petticoats" for attacking Marie Antoinette. William Godwin, her future husband, described the book as illogical and ungrammatical; in his Memoirs of Wollstonecraft, he dedicated only a paragraph to a discussion of the content of the work, calling it "intemperate".

All the major periodicals of the day reviewed the Rights of Men. The Analytical Review agreed with Wollstonecraft's arguments and praised her "lively and animated remarks". The Monthly Review was also sympathetic, but it pointed out faults in her writing. The Critical Review, the "sworn foe" of the Analytical Review, however, wrote in December 1790, after discovering that the author was a woman:

It has been observed in an old play, that minds have no sex; and in truth we did not discover this Defender of the Rights of Man to be a Woman. The second edition, however, which often reveals secrets, has attributed this pamphlet to Mrs. Wollstonecraft, and if she assumes the disguise of a man, she must not be surprised that she is not treated with the civility and respect that she would have received in her own person. As the article was written before we saw the second edition, we have presented an acknowledgement of this kind to the necessary alterations. It would not have been sufficient to have corrected merely verbal errors: a Lady should have been addressed with more respect. [emphasis in original]

The Gentleman's Magazine followed suit, criticizing the book's logic and "its absurd presumption that men will be happier if free", as well as Wollstonecraft's own presumption in writing on topics outside of her proper domain, commenting "the rights of men asserted by a fair lady! The age of chivalry cannot be over, or the sexes have changed their ground." However, the Rights of Men put Wollstonecraft on the map as a writer; from this point forward in her career, she was well known.

Wollstonecraft sent a copy of the book to the historian Catharine Macaulay, whom she greatly admired. Macaulay wrote back that she was "still more highly pleased that this publication which I have so greatly admired from its pathos & sentiment should have been written by a woman and thus to see my opinion of the powers and talents of the sex in your pen so early verified." William Roscoe, a Liverpool lawyer, writer, and patron of the arts, liked the book so much that he included Wollstonecraft in his satirical poem The Life, Death, and Wonderful Achievements of Edmund Burke:

Liberty Leading the People by Eugène Delacroix (1833)

And lo! an amazon stept out,
One WOLLSTONECRAFT her name,
Resolv'd to stop his mad career,
Whatever chance became.

While most of the early reviewers of the Rights of Men, as well as most of Wollstonecraft's early biographers, criticized the work's emotionalism, and juxtaposed it with Burke's masterpiece of logic, there has been a recent re-evaluation of her text. Since the 1970s, critics who have looked more closely at both her work and Burke's, have come to the conclusion that they share many rhetorical similarities, and that the masculine/logic and feminine/emotion binaries are unsupportable. Most Wollstonecraft scholars now recognize it was this work that radicalized Wollstonecraft and directed her future writings, particularly A Vindication of the Rights of Woman. It is not until after the halfway point of Rights of Men that she begins the dissection of Burke's gendered aesthetic; as Claudia Johnson contends, "it seems that in the act of writing the later portions of Rights of Men she discovered the subject that would preoccupy her for the rest of her career."

Two years later, when Wollstonecraft published the Rights of Woman, she extended many of the arguments she had begun in Rights of Men. If all people should be judged on their merits, she wrote, women should be included in that group. In both texts, Wollstonecraft emphasizes that the virtue of the British nation is dependent on the virtue of its people. To a great extent, she collapses the distinction between private and public and demands that all educated citizens be offered the chance to participate in the public sphere.

== See also ==
- Timeline of Mary Wollstonecraft
- Mary Wollstonecraft
- A Vindication of the Rights of Woman

== Notes ==
=== Bibliography ===
==== Primary sources ====
- Burke, Edmund. Reflections on the Revolution in France. Ed. Conor Cruise O'Brien. New York: Penguin Books, 1986. ISBN 0-14-043204-3.
- Butler, Marilyn, ed. Burke, Paine, Godwin, and the Revolution Controversy. Cambridge: Cambridge University Press, 2002. ISBN 0-521-28656-5.
- Godwin, William. Memoirs of the Author of A Vindication of the Rights of Woman. Eds. Pamela Clemit and Gina Luria Walker. Peterborough: Broadview Press, 2001. ISBN 1-55111-259-0.
- Wollstonecraft, Mary. The Complete Works of Mary Wollstonecraft. Ed. Janet Todd and Marilyn Butler. 7 vols. London: William Pickering, 1989. ISBN 0-8147-9225-1.
- Wollstonecraft, Mary. The Vindications: The Rights of Men and The Rights of Woman. Eds. D.L. Macdonald and Kathleen Scherf. Toronto: Broadview Literary Texts, 1997. ISBN 1-55111-088-1.

==== Contemporary reviews ====
- Analytical Review 8 (1790): 416–419.
- Critical Review 70 (1790): 694–696.
- English Review 17 (1791): 56–61.
- General Magazine and Impartial Review 4 (1791): 26–27.
- Gentleman's Magazine 61.1 (1791): 151–154.
- Monthly Review New Series 4 (1791): 95–97.
- New Annual Register 11 (1790): 237.
- Universal Magazine and Review 5 (1791): 77–78.
- Walker's Hibernian Magazine 1 (1791): 269–271 [copied from the Gentleman's Magazine]

==== Secondary sources ====
- Barrell, John and Jon Mee, eds. "Introduction". Trials for Treason and Sedition, 1792–1794. 8 vols. London: Pickering and Chatto, 2006–7. ISBN 978-1-85196-732-2.
- Furniss, Tom. "Mary Wollstonecraft's French Revolution". The Cambridge Companion to Mary Wollstonecraft. Ed. Claudia L. Johnson. Cambridge: Cambridge University Press, 2002. ISBN 0-521-78952-4.
- Johnson, Claudia L. Equivocal Beings: Politics, Gender, and Sentimentality in the 1790s. Chicago: University of Chicago Press, 1995. ISBN 0-226-40184-7.
- Jones, Chris. "Mary Wollstonecraft's Vindications and their political tradition". The Cambridge Companion to Mary Wollstonecraft. Ed. Claudia L. Johnson. Cambridge: Cambridge University Press, 2002. ISBN 0-521-78952-4.
- Keen, Paul. The Crisis of Literature in the 1790s: Print Culture and the Public Sphere. Cambridge: Cambridge University Press, 1999. ISBN 0-521-65325-8.
- Kelly, Gary. Revolutionary Feminism: The Mind and Career of Mary Wollstonecraft. New York: St. Martin's, 1992. ISBN 0-312-12904-1.
- Myers, Mitzi. "Politics from the Outside: Mary Wollstonecraft's First Vindication". Studies in Eighteenth-Century Culture 6 (1977): 113–32.
- Paulson, Ronald. Representations of Revolution, 1789–1820. New Haven: Yale University Press, 1983. ISBN 0-300-02864-4.
- Poovey, Mary. The Proper Lady and the Woman Writer. Chicago: University of Chicago Press, 1984. ISBN 0-226-67528-9.
- Sapiro, Virginia. A Vindication of Political Virtue: The Political Theory of Mary Wollstonecraft. Chicago: University of Chicago Press, 1992. ISBN 0-226-73491-9.
- Sunstein, Emily. A Different Face: the Life of Mary Wollstonecraft. Boston: Little, Brown and Co., 1975. ISBN 0-06-014201-4.
- Taylor, Barbara. Mary Wollstonecraft and the Feminist Imagination. Cambridge: Cambridge University Press, 2003. ISBN 0-521-66144-7.
- Todd, Janet. Mary Wollstonecraft: A Revolutionary Life. London: Weidenfeld & Nicolson, 2000. ISBN 0-231-12184-9.
- Wardle, Ralph M. Mary Wollstonecraft: A Critical Biography. Lincoln: University of Nebraska Press, 1951.
