= Pamphlet war =

Protracted argument or discussion through printed medium

A pamphlet war is a protracted argument or discussion through printed media, especially between the time the printing press became common, and when state intervention like copyright laws made such public discourse more difficult. The purpose was to defend or attack a certain perspective or idea. Pamphlet wars have occurred multiple times throughout history, as both social and political platforms. Pamphlet wars became viable platforms for this protracted discussion with the advent and spread of the printing press. Cheap printing presses, and increased literacy made the late 17th century a key stepping stone for the development of pamphlet wars, a period of prolific use of this type of debate. Over 2200 pamphlets were published between 1600–1715 alone.

Pamphlet wars are generally credited for powering many key social changes of the era, including the Reformation and the Revolution Controversy, the English philosophical debate set off by the French Revolution.

== History of the pamphlet in England ==
Henry VIII

Throughout Europe in the 16th century, printed tracts were used to argue religious doctrine and foment support for religious causes. In England, Henry VIII used print literature to justify his break from the Catholic Church. During the subsequent reigns of Edward and Mary, print polemics escalated into propaganda warfare, as print media gained enormous potential to sway common opinion. By the 1560s, print was widely used to convey news. In 1562, the first pamphlets appeared, which discussed the English forces sent to aid the Protestant French Huguenots. In 1569, pamphlets reported the revolt of the Northern Earls and the subsequent Rebellion of the same year. In the 1580s, pamphlets began to replace broadsheet ballads as the means to convey information to the general public. Over the next century, the pamphlet became the principal means of garnering support for a cause or an idea, and was particularly influential during the English Civil Wars (1642-1651) and the Glorious Revolution of 1688. Through the ensuing decades, the pamphlet lost some popularity due to the emergence of newspapers and journals, but continued to be an important medium of public debate, as illustrated by the Revolution Controversy a full century later in the 1790s.

== Pamphlet printing ==
Coming from a Latin word, "pamphlet" literally means "small book." In the early days of printing, the format of the book or pamphlet depended on the size of the paper used and the number of times it was folded. If a page was only folded once, it was called a folio. If it was folded twice, it was known as a quarto. An octave was a paper folded three times. A pamphlet was usually 1-12 sheets of paper folded in quarto, or 8-96 pages. It was sold for one or two pennies apiece. The printing of a pamphlet involved many people: the author, the printer, suppliers, print-makers, compositor, correctors, pressmen, binders, and distributors. Once the pamphleteer had written the pamphlet, it was sent to the printing house to be corrected, set into type, and printed. The papers were then given to the printer's warehouse-keeper, who bundled the copies and sent them to the bookseller, who was probably the one financing the printing. He was responsible to bind the pamphlets, usually by sewing them, and then sold them wholesale to individual bookselling vendors. The booksellers then sold them from a stall in the marketplace.

== Pamphlet subjects ==
Pamphlets began as the means of conveyance for religious debates, and therefore religious topics were one of the main subjects they dealt with. The definition of a pamphlet came to mean a short work dealing with social, political, or religious issues. Typical topics included the Civil war, Church of England doctrines, Acts of Parliament, the Popish Plot (see below), the Stuart Era, and Cromwell propaganda. In addition, pamphlets were also used for romantic fiction, autobiography, scurrilous personal abuse, and social criticism. They contained much of the propaganda of the 17th century in the midst of the religious and political turmoil. They were also used for debates between the Puritans and the Anglican. During the Glorious Revolution, pamphlets were political weapons.

== Authors ==
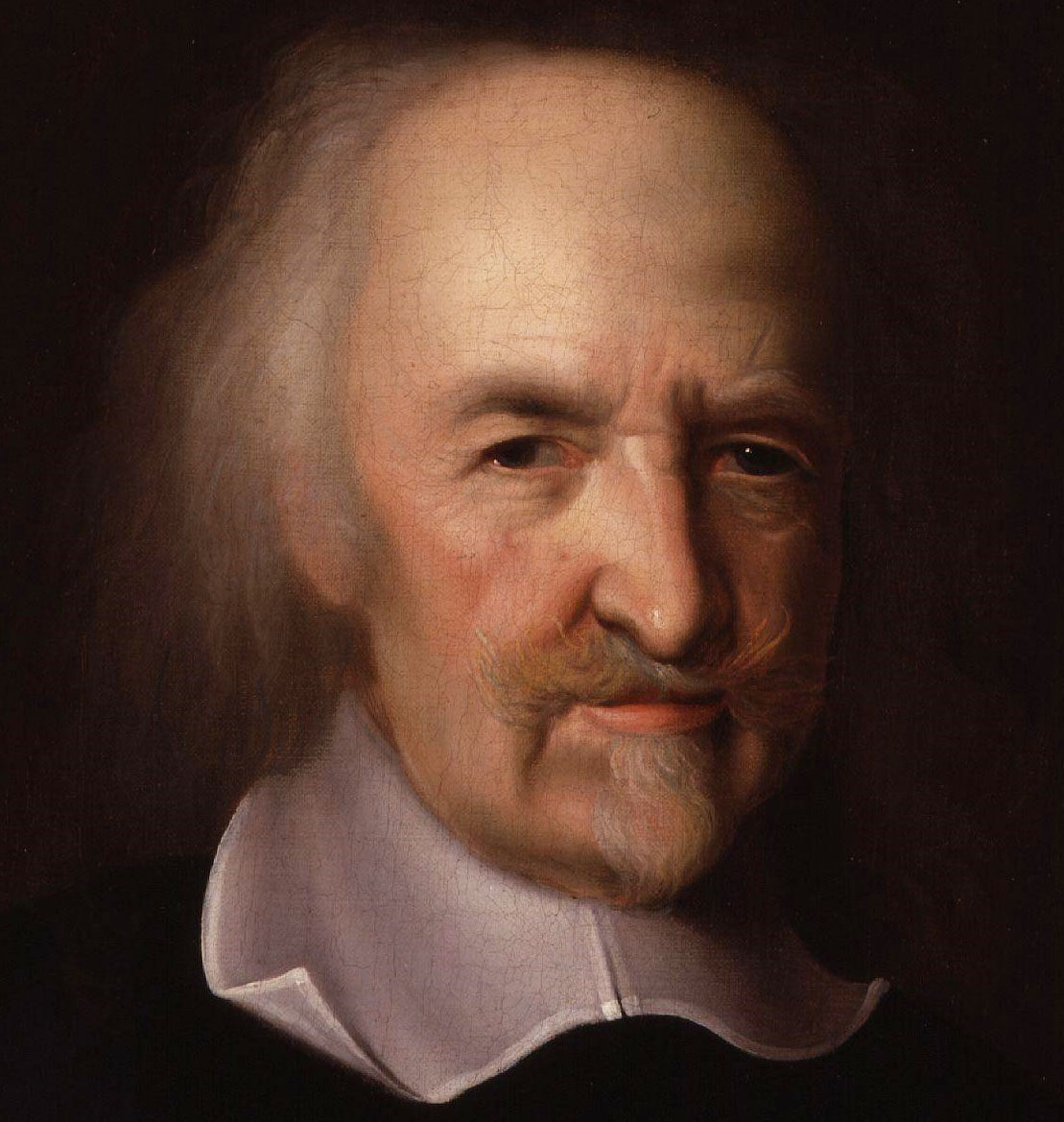
Thomas Hobbes

There were many authors of pamphlets. However some of the more popular authors include Daniel Defoe, Thomas Hobbes, Jonathan Swift, John Milton, and Samuel Pepys. Also included in the midst are Thomas Nashe, Joseph Addison, Richard Steele, and Matthew Prior. In 1591–1592, Robert Greene released a series of pamphlets which later inspired many other authors including Thomas Middleton and Thomas Dekker.

== Critics ==
Pamphlets, along with their vast popularity, received criticism. There were many in the time period who believed that pamphlets were full of foolishness. They thought the pamphlets were not good enough literature and that they would turn people from "good" writing. They believed that pamphlets would be the end of the great volumes of literature and that great writing would be forgotten.

== News reporting ==
Pamphlets made a great difference in the way news was reported to the general public. With the publication of pamphlets, it was no longer difficult for people to hear of events taking place far away. The closer the occurrence was to London, the easier and faster people heard of it. For example, the Battle of Edgehill took place on 23 October 1642. The first pamphlet reporting the incident was printed on 25 October 24 hours after some of the orders reported had been given. While not entirely accurate, and hurriedly made, the pamphlet nonetheless was able to tell the general public what had happened in the battle. A more accurate, specific, and readable account was available in a pamphlet printed on 26 October, and the "authorized" version was available only five days after the battle took place.

== Marprelate pamphlets ==
In 1588, a series of pamphlets marked a turning point for the Puritans, dividing them from other Protestants in the country. The authors wrote under the pseudonym of Martin Marprelate and his two sons of the same name. The true identities of the authors were never discovered. The pamphlets aimed to provoke authorities to take action against censorship. The series was among the first to ask questions directly of its readers.

== Early pamphlet wars ==
=== Elizabethan pamphlet wars ===
As a means of forming or swaying public opinion, pamphlets like these had a part in influencing society, even as the content was itself influenced by society. During the 16th century and continuing for a short while in the early 17th century in England there was rise in the use of pamphlet wars to discuss a myriad of issues spanning from the civil war, to religious freedoms and the roles of women in society. The Queen herself participated in these discussions, making sure that she was widely read and understood by her people in order to gain favour and establish herself as the monarch despite being a woman. Examples of her use of this medium appear in To the Troops at Tilbury written in 1588, On Mary's Execution written in 1586, and many more. Another famous writer of this period to take advantage of the pamphlet was Emilia Lanier, famous for her arguments about the role of women. A common idea promoted by many literary works and the general attitude towards women, Lanier's work "Eve's Apology in Defence of Women" refuted the belief that Eve is responsible for the fall of man. A very uncommon and unpopular stance to take, Lanier accomplishes her defence through structuring it as an apology, one of the earliest subversive feminist texts. Similarly, Francis Bacon wrote his Essays to promote his idea of morality and other complicated social issues. For example, his work, "Of Love" examines the various understandings of the concept of love, particularly as it was perceived during the Elizabethan era.

=== Eikon Series ===
From 1649 until 1651, some five pamphlets were published in a debate about the execution of King Charles I of England (1600-1649). Prior to his execution, King Charles wrote the first pamphlet in the discussion, Eikon Basilike’’ (from the Greek “eikon” for image and “basileus” for king). The subtitle of this work - Portraiture of His Sacred Majesty in His Solitudes and Sufferings - indicates that Charles sought to portray himself as a martyr to the cause of regal prerogative. In the following months, several response pamphlets were published (collectively known as the "Eikon" series), including: Eikon Alethine, Eikon e Pistes, Eikonoklastes, and Eikon Aklastos,” alternately attacking or defending the king, his regicide, and his self-portrait in “Eikon Basilike.”

== Popish Plot and Elizabeth Cellier ==
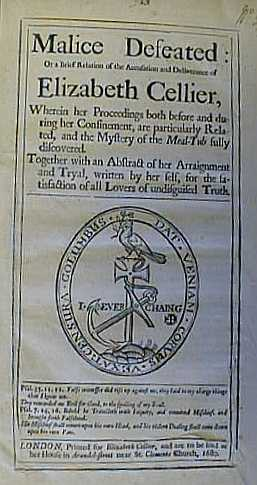
Front page of the pamphlet Malice Defeated published in 1680

In the 1680s, after being acquitted of the "Meal-Tub Plot" for which she was accused, Elizabeth Cellier wrote Malice Defeated, which, along with The Matchless Picaro, sparked a pamphlet war surrounding debate of the ascension of a Catholic king to the throne. She, and many associates, published several dozen works regarding the issues of their time in dealing with the Popish Plot. The repercussions of Cellier's writings were widespread as members of her company were arrested and punished. Cellier herself was convicted of libel and received harsh punishment, including being stoned and imprisoned for a time.

== Effects ==
These early pamphlet wars served to change the way literary, and even social, conversations were viewed and carried out. They also created new ways of conversation, and new styles of language. Elizabeth Cellier was also a key figure in her defiance of normal gender roles and willingness to publicly submit her writings and vocalize her views.
