= A Discourse on the Love of Our Country =

1789 speech and pamphlet by Richard Price

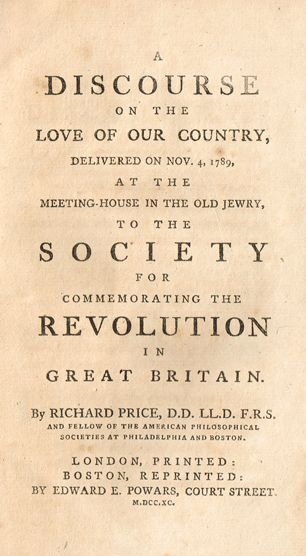
- Author: Richard Price
- Genre: Political theory
- Publisher: Edward E. Powars, Boston
- Publication date: 1789
- Publication place: Great Britain
- Media type: Pamphlet
- Text: A Discourse on the Love of Our Country at Wikisource

A Discourse on the Love of Our Country is a speech and pamphlet delivered by Richard Price in England in 1789, in support of the French Revolution, equating it with the Glorious Revolution a century earlier in England. This set off the Revolution Controversy, an exchange of arguments via pamphlet between those supporting or opposing the idea of the French Revolution.

== Summary ==
In 1789, moral philosopher and dissenting minister Richard Price was watching the French Revolution, and felt that it was fulfilling prophecies of his millennialist belief that a great change was going to transform humanity. To express this, he wrote a speech, which he delivered to the Revolution Society on 4 November of that year. The Revolution Society had been formed in support of the overthrow of King James II a century earlier during the Glorious Revolution and on that date was celebrating the birthday of William III, who had been installed as the new king replacing James II. Price compared the French Revolution to that event, much as he had previously defended the American Revolution, despite being a loyal subject living in the country at war against it.

Price starts out by establishing that he believes in patriotism, in love of one's own country. Because the revolution was overthrowing the French rulers and was seen as a dangerous example by the English political class, it was important to assert the fact that revolutionaries can be as "patriotic" as defenders of the country as it was. But Price says that one's country is not necessarily its rulers, nor even its geography, but is the principles and people that are identified with it, that love for country is a love for one's community and ideals. That it's one's duty to love their country only if it is conceived of as being just that.

He also notes that this is not an obligation to believe in an unrealistic idea of a nation's superiority or righteousness. A nation's goodness or greatness depends on holding it to high standards, not pretending it achieves them automatically.

He also states that this obligatory patriotism is not the same as a desire to dominate and even conquer other countries, which he describes in negative, pejorative terminology.

Price then goes on to establish the groundwork for supporting the right to overthrow a repressive State. He says it's one's patriotic duty to enlighten one's countrymen, who otherwise the world over seem willing to suffer under repressive rule.

Liberty is a great blessing to be advocated with patriotic zeal, essential to the prosperity of any nation, something to be defended both from external aggression and internal oppression. He states that "if you love your country, you cannot be zealous enough in promoting the cause of liberty in it."

== Natural rights ==
Price also establishes the basic tenor of the entire Revolution Controversy, identifying natural rights as fundamental to patriotism, and listing the three he considers most essential:

First; The right to liberty of conscience in religious matters.
Secondly; The right to resist power when abused. And,
Thirdly; The right to choose our own governors; to cashier them for misconduct; and to frame a government for ourselves.

The Glorious Revolution, he says, was founded on those three principles (the English Bill of Rights came from that event), and that without them it would not have been legitimate, a rebellion (implicitly bad) instead of a revolution.

He goes on to, mostly implicitly, associate both the French and American revolutions with these principles and to celebrate this association. As with the rest of his narrative, he sprinkles religious terminology in this conclusion, saying of this time of revolution:

What an eventful period is this! I am thankful that I have lived to [see] it; and I could almost say, Lord, now lettest thou thy servant depart in peace, for mine eyes have seen thy salvation. I have lived to see a diffusion of knowledge, which has undermined superstition and error. I have lived to see the rights of men better understood than ever; and nations panting for liberty, which seemed to have lost the idea of it. I have lived to see Thirty Millions of people, indignant and resolute, spurning at slavery, and demanding liberty with an irresistible voice; their king led in triumph, and an arbitrary monarch surrendering himself to his subjects. After sharing in the benefits of one Revolution, I have been spared to be a witness to two other Revolutions, both glorious. And now, methinks, I see the ardor for liberty catching and spreading; a general amendment beginning in human affairs; the dominion of kings changed for the dominion of laws, and the dominion of priests giving way to the dominion of reason and conscience.

== Impact ==
This speech was quickly picked up by pamphleteers and printed in London and Boston, spurring responses both by supporters and critics in a flurry of debate known as the Revolution Controversy.

Edmund Burke criticised Price's ideas and defended the British constitution, converting a short text of his own into a longer response, Reflections on the Revolution in France. William Coxe opposed the premise that one's country is principles and people, not the State itself.

Conversely, two seminal political pieces of political history were written in Price's favour by members of his congregation at Newington Green Unitarian Church, Rights of Man by Thomas Paine, and A Vindication of the Rights of Men by Mary Wollstonecraft, who followed this with what is sometimes described as the first feminist text, A Vindication of the Rights of Woman. In 1792 Christopher Wyvill published Defence of Dr. Price and the Reformers of England, a plea for reform and moderation.

This exchange of ideas has been described as "one of the great political debates in British history." Even in France, there was varying agreement during this debate, English participants generally opposing the violent means that the Revolution had used to achieve its ends.
