= Revolution Controversy =

Historical British debate

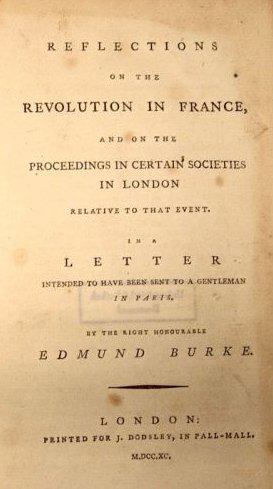
Title page from Edmund Burke's Reflections on the Revolution in France, 1790

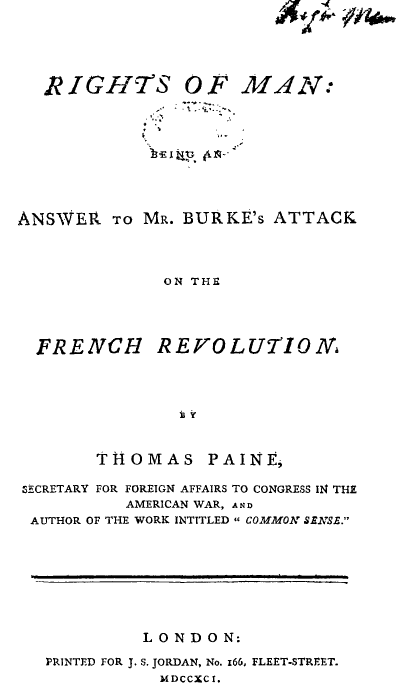
Title page from the first edition of Thomas Paine's Rights of Man, 1791

Title pages representing the controversy

The Revolution Controversy was a British debate over the French Revolution from 1789 to 1795. A pamphlet war began in earnest after the publication of Edmund Burke's Reflections on the Revolution in France (1790), which defended the House of Bourbon, the French aristocracy, and the Catholic Church in France. Because he had supported the American Patriots in their rebellion against Great Britain, Burke's views sent a shockwave through the British Isles. Many writers responded to defend the French Revolution, such as Thomas Paine, Mary Wollstonecraft and William Godwin. Alfred Cobban calls the debate that erupted "perhaps the last real discussion of the fundamentals of politics" in Britain. The themes articulated by those responding to Burke would become a central feature of the radical working-class movement in Britain in the 19th century and of Romanticism. Most Britons celebrated the storming of the Bastille in 1789 and believed that The Kingdom of France should be curtailed by a more democratic form of government. However, by December 1795, after the Reign of Terror and the War of the First Coalition, few still supported the French cause.

== Edmund Burke's Reflections ==
Responding in part to a sermon defending the French Revolution given by the Dissenting clergyman Richard Price entitled A Discourse on the Love of Our Country (1789), Burke published his Reflections on the Revolution in France in an effort to advance arguments for the current aristocratic government. Because Burke had been part of the liberal Whig Party, a critic of monarchical power, a supporter of the American Revolutionaries and a critic of government corruption in India, most of Britain expected him to support the French revolutionaries. By failing to do so, he shocked the populace and angered his friends and supporters. Burke's book sold 30,000 copies in two years. The Reflections defended "the aristocratic concepts of paternalism, loyalty, chivalry, the hereditary principle" and property.

Burke criticized the view of many British thinkers and writers who had welcomed the early stages of the French Revolution. The radicals saw the revolution as analogous to Britain's own Glorious Revolution in 1688, which had restricted the powers of the Stuart monarchy, Burke argued that the appropriate historical analogy was the English Civil War (1642–1651) in which Charles I had been executed in 1649. Burke viewed the French Revolution as the violent overthrow of a legitimate government and contended that citizens do not have the right to overthrow their government. Civilisations and governments, he maintained, are the result of social and political consensus, and their traditions ought not to be challenged since the result would be anarchy.

== Responses ==
Radicals such as William Godwin, Thomas Paine and Mary Wollstonecraft argued for republicanism and other radical ideas for their time. Most of those who came to be called radicals emphasized the same themes, namely, "a sense of personal liberty and autonomy"; "a belief in civic virtue"; "a hatred of corruption"; an opposition to war because it profited only the "landed interest"; and a critique of the monarchy and the aristocracy and its perceived desire to draw power away from the House of Commons. Many of their works were published by Joseph Johnson, who was eventually jailed for his seditious activities. The Birmingham bookseller James Belcher was also jailed for seditious writings in 1793 for publishing Paine's Letter addressed to the addressers on the late proclamation. The more moderate Scottish Whig lawyer James Mackintosh also responded to Burke.

Wollstonecraft had been much influenced by the ideas she ingested from Price's sermons at Newington Green Unitarian Church and the whole ethos of Rational Dissent in the village of Newington Green. Those seeds germinated into A Vindication of the Rights of Men, her response to Burke's denunciation of her mentor. Paine, one of the Founding Fathers of the United States, who argued in Rights of Man that popular political revolution is permissible when a government does not safeguard its people, their natural rights and their national interests.

The controversy left further legacies. Wollstonecraft's most famous work, A Vindication of the Rights of Woman was written in 1792 in the spirit of rationalism extending Price's arguments about equality to women. Anna Laetitia Barbauld, a prolific writer admired by Samuel Johnson and William Wordsworth and the wife of the minister at Newington Green, alluded to Burke's work and his opponents in her "Sins of the Government, Sins of the Nation" (1793).

== Sources ==
- Butler, Marilyn, ed. Burke, Paine, Godwin, and the Revolution Controversy. Cambridge: Cambridge University Press, 1984. ISBN 0-521-28656-5.
- Gordon, Lyndall. Vindication: A Life of Mary Wollstonecraft. Great Britain: Virago, 2005. ISBN 1-84408-141-9.
