= Gilbert Imlay =

American businessman, author, and diplomat (1754–1828)

Gilbert Imlay (February 9, 1754 – November 20, 1828) was an American businessman, writer, and diplomat.

He served in the U.S. embassy to France and became one of the earliest American writers, producing two books, the influential A Topographical Description of the Western Territory of North America, and a novel, The Emigrants, both of which promoted settlement in the North American interior.

Imlay was known in his day as a shrewd but unscrupulous businessman involved in land speculation in Virginia. However, he is best known in the modern era for his brief affair with English feminist writer Mary Wollstonecraft, which resulted in the birth of a daughter, Fanny Imlay.

== Life ==
Little is known of Imlay's early life. He was born in 1754, probably in Upper Freehold, New Jersey, where the Imlay family first settled in the early 18th century. During the American Revolutionary War he served in the New Jersey Line, enlisting for a time in Forman's Additional Continental Regiment. He rose to the rank of First Lieutenant in the Continental Army; though he would later style himself "Captain", there is no evidence he ever actually attained that rank.

Following his military service, Imlay sought his fortune in Virginia and purchased a tract of land in Fayette County in 1783. He arrived there in March 1784 and quickly became involved in land speculation. In 1785, he quietly left America, probably for Europe, leaving a string of unpaid debts in his wake. In 1792, he was in Britain, where he published his influential A Topographical Description of the Western Territory of North America that year. (Subsequent editions would include the adventures of Daniel Boone, written by John Filson, as an appendix.)

Imlay later tried his hand at fiction, publishing The Emigrants in 1793; both works promoted the American interior and encouraged their settlement by Europeans. In light of certain plot elements, diction, and concern for feminist issues, along with a remarkable lack of specific information on that portion of the United States described in considerable detail in A Topographical Description, there is considerable speculation that Mary Wollstonecraft had a hand in the novel's composition. If so, it would suggest a mutual relationship between Imlay and Wollstonecraft well before their publicized first meeting in Paris.

In 1793, during the French Revolution, Imlay became a diplomatic representative of the United States to France, while at the same time pursuing his own business interests by running the British blockade of French ports. Imlay's excursion into diplomacy led to his meeting Mary Wollstonecraft; to shield herself from the dangers of the French Revolution, she registered at the American Embassy as Imlay's wife, but there is no record of a marriage. Imlay and Wollstonecraft shared a home in Paris, though business interests took him for extended periods of time to Le Havre, much to the dismay of his reputed wife. Imlay eventually returned to London, leaving Wollstonecraft and her daughter alone in Paris. In time she rejoined him in England, carried her infant daughter to Scandinavia in search of a ship load of French silver on Imlay's behalf, and returned to London, only to discover that Imlay was living with an actress. That effectively ended their relationship. Despite his promises, Imlay showed no interest in his child's welfare, and left her to the care of Wollstonecraft's husband William Godwin after her mother's death three years later.

Little is known of Imlay's later life. He apparently engaged in businesses as varied as furniture and fruit vending, and his name appears, characteristically, in court records for non-payment of incurred debts. A death record and tombstone of someone with his name appears on the Island of Jersey (a notorious center for smuggling) in 1828.
