= Mitzi Myers =

American literary scholar (1939-2001)

- Born: Mitzi Ouida Myers; October 9, 1939; Sulphur Springs, Texas, U.S.
- Died: November 5, 2001 (aged 62); Anaheim Hills, California, U.S.
- Occupation: Literary scholar
- Spouse: Dennis Allen Hengeveld (m. 1967; died 1983)
- Awards: Guggenheim Fellowship (1990)

Academic background
- Education: East Texas State College; Rice University
- Thesis: Aspects of William Godwin's reputation in the 1790's (1969)
- Doctoral advisor: Carroll Camden

Academic work
- Discipline: Children's literature; women authors
- Institutions: University of California, Santa Barbara; California State University; University of California, Los Angeles

Mitzi Ouida Myers (October 9, 1939 – November 5, 2001) was an American literary scholar. A 1990 Guggenheim Fellow, she specialized in children's literature and Georgian era women authors. She worked as a professor and lecturer at University of California, Santa Barbara and California State University, before settling at University of California, Los Angeles.

== Biography ==
=== Early life and academic career ===
Myers was born on October 9, 1939, in Sulphur Springs, Texas. As a young child, she was "a lover of reading and of books". She obtained her BA (1961) and MA (1962) at East Texas State College and worked as a teaching assistant at Rice University, before obtaining her PhD there in 1969. Her doctoral dissertation Aspects of William Godwin's reputation in the 1790's was supervised by Carroll Camden.

Originally an assistant professor at University of California, Santa Barbara from 1966 to 1973, Myers later started working at California State University in 1974. She worked as a lecturer at the Cal Poly branches in San Bernardino (1974-1977), Fullerton (1976-1977), Pomona (1978-1980; 1982-1988), and Long Beach (1982-1983). In 1980, she began working as a lecturer at University of California, Los Angeles, remaining with the college for the next two decades. She taught courses focused on the history of children's literature and young adult literature, as well as writing courses. Her work at UCLA also included basic writing undergraduate curriculum development and contribution to the Children's Book Collection. She also taught at Chapman University and Scripps College. She was a 1986-1987 National Endowment for the Humanities Fellow.

=== Scholarly career ===
Having become interested in the field while at Rice, Myers specialized in children's literature as a scholar. Her status as a children's literature expert was widely recognized throughout the world, and Naomi Wood said that Myers was "unquestionably the founding mother of eighteenth-century children's literature criticism". Her contributions to children's literature studies included extending the start of children's literature beyond the 1865 publication of Alice's Adventures in Wonderland; encouraging the study of book copy defacements as "the hidden history of childhood"; editing The Norton Anthology of Children's Literature: The Traditions in English; and making contributions to the Cambridge Companion to Children's Literature and Encyclopedia Americana.

Myers also studied Georgian era women authors like Maria Edgeworth, Hannah More, and Mary Wollstonecraft, and considered Edgeworth her favorite. She won the 1988 Children's Literature Association Best Critical Essay Award for her 1986 essay "Impeccable Governesses, Rational Dames, and Moral Mothers: Mary Wollstonecraft and the Female Tradition in Georgian Children's Books". In 1990, she was awarded a Guggenheim Fellowship to research Edgeworth's work.

=== Personal life ===
On March 14, 1967, Myers married Dennis Allen Hengeveld, a contemporary from Rice who later became an English professor at Cal State Fullerton. They were married until his death on May 10, 1983. She also had a brother, whom she survived, as well as a sister who outlived her.

Myers reportedly "delighted in silver jewelry, fast driving, and an absolute accuracy of annotation". She reportedly called herself the "grand old queen of the footnote".

=== Death and legacy ===
On August 13, 2000, Myers's house in Fullerton, California, was damaged in a fire. Her four Edgeworth manuscripts in progress at the time – two academic books and two novel annotated versions – were lost in the fire, as was the majority of her personal library of 35,000 volumes, reportedly including rare books and "nearly all of them annotated". Myers, whose sister Patsy told the Los Angeles Times that the books "were like children to her", repeatedly reentered the burning house in an attempt to save the books, suffering second- and third-degree burns and pneumonia as a result. She went on medical leave afterwards and temporarily moved to Anaheim Hills, where she died on November 5, 2001, due to complications from the pneumonia, aged 62.

The Lion and the Unicorn called Myers "one of her generation's most far-ranging and rigorous scholars" in an obituary for her. She had a festschrift, Culturing the Child, 1690–1914, released in 2005 and edited by Donelle Ruwe.
