= Virginia Sapiro =

Virginia Sapiro (born February 28, 1951) is an American political scientist and political psychologist.

A native of East Orange, New Jersey, Sapiro graduated from Clark University in 1972, and obtained her doctorate from the University of Michigan in 1976, after which she began teaching at University of Wisconsin–Madison. She was appointed Sophonisba P. Breckinridge Professor of Political Science and Women's Studies there in 1995, and served through 2007, when she joined the Boston University faculty. Sapiro has served the American Political Science Association as secretary, vice president, and president of the APSA Organized Section on Women and Politics Research and as well as the APSA Organized Section on Elections, Public Opinion, and Voting Behavior.
