= Claudia L. Johnson =

Murray Professor of English Literature at Princeton University

Claudia L. Johnson is the Murray Professor of English Literature at Princeton University. Johnson received her PhD from Princeton University; she specializes in Restoration and 18th century British literature, with an especial focus on the novel. She is also interested in feminist theory and gender studies. Johnson is renowned for her books on Jane Austen and Mary Wollstonecraft.

== Scholarship ==
Johnson's major books include Jane Austen: Women, Politics, and the Novel (Chicago, 1988) and Equivocal Beings: Politics, Gender and Sentimentality in the 1790s (Chicago, 1995). She also edited The Cambridge Companion to Mary Wollstonecraft (Cambridge, 2002) as well as editions of Jane Austen's Mansfield Park (Norton, 1998), Sense and Sensibility (Norton, 2002), and Northanger Abbey (Oxford, 2003).

Nina Auerbach has called Equivocal Beings the "definitive account of Wollstonecraft, [Ann] Radcliffe, and [Fanny] Burney . . . It should become one of the classic feminist accounts, not just of the late eighteenth century, but of all women writers in their time" and Margaret Anne Doody writes that Jane Austen is a "brilliant, witty and well-informed book . . . the best single book on Austen for a decade or more—and one of the best ever."

"She is now putting the finishing touches on a book about author-love called Jane Austen’s Cults and Cultures, which traces permutations of “Jane mania” from 1817 to the present, and is also working on another called Raising the Novel, which "explores modern efforts to create a novelistic canon by elevating novels to keystones of high culture."

== Awards ==
She has been awarded Guggenheim Fellowships and grants by the National Endowment for the Humanities.
