= Joseph Johnson (publisher) =

London bookseller and publisher (1738–1809)

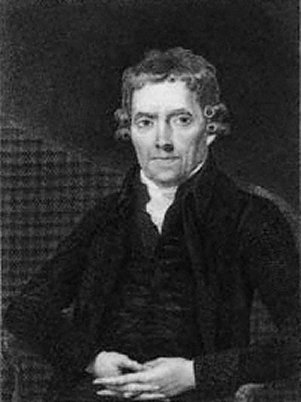
- Engraving of Johnson by William Sharp, after a painting by Moses Haughton the Elder
- Born: 15 November 1738; Everton, Liverpool
- Died: 20 December 1809 (aged 71); London
- Occupations: bookseller, publisher

Joseph Johnson (15 November 1738 – 20 December 1809) was an influential 18th-century English bookseller and publisher. His publications covered a wide variety of genres and a broad spectrum of opinions on important issues. Johnson is best known for publishing the works of radical thinkers such as Mary Wollstonecraft, William Godwin, Thomas Malthus, Erasmus Darwin and Joel Barlow, feminist economist Priscilla Wakefield, as well as religious Dissenters such as Joseph Priestley, Anna Laetitia Barbauld, Gilbert Wakefield, and George Walker.

In the 1760s, Johnson established his publishing business, which focused primarily on religious works. He also became friends with Priestley and the artist Henry Fuseli – two relationships that lasted his entire life and brought him much business. In the 1770s and 1780s, Johnson expanded his business, publishing important works in medicine and children's literature as well as the popular poetry of William Cowper and Erasmus Darwin. Throughout his career, Johnson helped shape the thought of his era not only through his publications, but also through his support of innovative writers and thinkers. He fostered the open discussion of new ideas, particularly at his famous weekly dinners, the regular attendees of which became known as the "Johnson Circle".

In the 1790s, Johnson aligned himself with the supporters of the French Revolution, and published an increasing number of political pamphlets in addition to a prominent journal, the Analytical Review, which offered British reformers a voice in the public sphere. In 1799, he was indicted on charges of seditious libel for publishing a pamphlet by the Unitarian minister Gilbert Wakefield. After spending six months in prison, albeit under relatively comfortable conditions, Johnson published fewer political works. In the last decade of his career, Johnson did not seek out many new writers; however, he remained successful by publishing the collected works of authors such as William Shakespeare.

Johnson's friend John Aikin eulogized him as "the father of the booktrade". He has also been called "the most important publisher in England from 1770 until 1810" for his appreciation and promotion of young writers, his emphasis on publishing inexpensive works directed at a growing middle-class readership, and his cultivation and advocacy of women writers at a time when they were viewed with skepticism.

== Early life ==
Johnson was the second son of John Johnson, a yeoman who lived in Everton, Liverpool, and his wife Rebecca Turner. Religious Dissent marked Johnson from the beginning of his life, as two of his mother's relatives were prominent Baptist ministers and his father was a deacon. Liverpool, at the time of Johnson's youth, was fast becoming a bustling urban centre and was one of the most important commercial ports in England. These two characteristics of his home – Dissent and commercialism – remained central elements in Johnson's character throughout his life.

At the age of fifteen, Johnson was apprenticed to George Keith, a London bookseller who specialized in publishing religious tracts such as Reflections on the Modern but Unchristian Practice of Innoculation. As Gerald Tyson, Johnson's major modern biographer, explains, it was unusual for the younger son of a family living in relative obscurity to move to London and to become a bookseller. Scholars have speculated that Johnson was indentured to Keith because the bookseller was associated with Liverpool Baptists. Keith and Johnson published several works together later in their careers, which suggests that the two remained on friendly terms after Johnson started his own business.

=== 1760s: Beginnings in publishing ===
Upon completing his apprenticeship in 1761, Johnson opened his own business, but he struggled to establish himself, moving his shop several times within one year. Two of his early publications were a kind of day planner: The Complete Pocket-Book; Or, Gentleman and Tradesman's Daily Journal for the Year of Our Lord, 1763 and The Ladies New and Polite Pocket Memorandum Book. Such pocketbooks were popular and Johnson outsold his rivals by publishing his both earlier and cheaper. Johnson continued to sell these profitable books until the end of the 1790s, but as a religious Dissenter, he was primarily interested in publishing religious texts, which dominated his book list. He also published works relating to Liverpool (his home town) and medicine. However, as a publisher Johnson attended to more than the selling and distributing of books, as scholar Leslie Chard explains:

Besides the actual selling of books to the public, the bookseller saw to their publication, arrangements with printers, with advertisers, with other booksellers in the city, the provinces, and even foreign countries, in short to their distribution. He also sold, incongruously but typically, patent medicine. But what probably most occupied his time was the welfare of his authors: at the most he fed and housed them, but at the least he served as banker, postal clerk and packager, literary agent and editor, social chairman, and psychiatrist.

As Johnson became successful and his reputation grew, other publishers began including him in congers – syndicates that spread the risk of publishing a costly or inflammatory book among several firms.

==== Formative friendships ====
In his late twenties, Johnson formed two friendships that were to shape the rest of his life. The first was with the painter and writer Henry Fuseli, who was described as "quick witted and pugnacious". Fuseli's early 19th-century biographer writes that when Fuseli met Johnson in 1764, Johnson "had already acquired the character which he retained during life, – that of a man of great integrity, and encourager of literary men as far as his means extended, and an excellent judge of their productions". The friendship became so close that twentieth-century biographer Claire Tomalin speculated that they might have been lovers, which Tyson dismisses by arguing that many tradesmen in London remained unmarried and took in lodgers or shared accommodation for economic reasons.

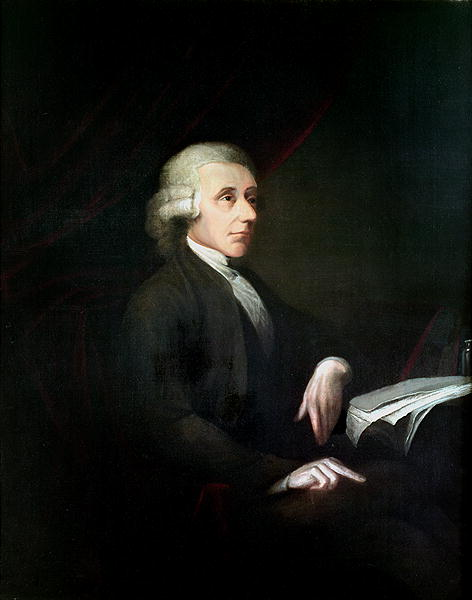
Johnson commissioned this portrait of his close friend Joseph Priestley from his other close friend Henry Fuseli around 1783. The portrait is today in the collections of Dr Williams's Library.

The second and possibly more consequential friendship was with Joseph Priestley, the renowned natural philosopher and Unitarian theologian. This friendship led Johnson to discard the Baptist faith of his youth and to adopt Unitarianism, as well as to pursue forms of political dissent. Johnson's success as a publisher can be explained in large part through his association with Priestley, as Priestley published dozens of books with him and introduced him to many other Dissenting writers. Through Priestley's recommendation, Johnson was able to issue the works of many Dissenters, especially those from Warrington Academy: the poet, essayist, and children's author Anna Laetitia Barbauld; her brother, the physician and writer, John Aikin; the naturalist Johann Reinhold Forster; the Unitarian minister and controversialist Gilbert Wakefield; the moralist William Enfield; and the political economist Thomas Malthus. Tyson writes that "the relationship between the Academy and the bookseller was mutually very useful. Not only did many of the tutors send occasional manuscripts for publication, but also former pupils often sought him out in later years to issue their works." By printing the works of Priestley and other of the Warrington tutors, Johnson also made himself known to an even larger network of Dissenting intellectuals, including those in the Lunar Society, which expanded his business further. Priestley, in turn, trusted Johnson enough to handle the logistics of his induction into the Royal Society.

==== Partnerships ====
In July 1765, Johnson moved his business to the more visible 8 Paternoster Row and formed a partnership with B. Davenport, of whom little is known aside from his association with Johnson. Chard postulates that they were attracted by mutual beliefs because the firm of Johnson and Davenport published even more religious works, including many that were "rigidly Calvinistic". However, in the summer of 1767, Davenport and Johnson parted ways; scholars have speculated that this rupture occurred because Johnson's religious views were becoming more unorthodox.

Newly independent, with a solid reputation, Johnson did not need to struggle to establish himself as he had early in his career. Within a year, he published nine first editions himself as well as thirty-two works in partnership with other booksellers. He was also a part of "the select circle of bookmen that gathered at the Chapter Coffee House", which was the centre of social and commercial life for publishers and booksellers in 18th-century London. Major publishing ventures had started at the Chapter and important writers "clubbed" there.

In 1768 Johnson went into partnership with John Payne (Johnson was probably the senior partner); the following year they published 50 titles. Under Johnson and Payne, the firm published a wider array of works than under Johnson and Davenport. Although Johnson looked to his business interests, he did not publish works only to enrich himself. Projects that encouraged free discussion appealed to Johnson; for example, he helped Priestley publish the Theological Repository, a financial failure that nevertheless fostered open debate of theological questions. Although the journal lost Johnson money in the 1770s, he was willing to begin publishing it again in 1785 because he endorsed its values.

The late 1760s was a time of growing radicalism in Britain, and although Johnson did not participate actively in the events, he facilitated the speech of those who did, e.g., by publishing works on the disputed election of John Wilkes and the American Revolution. Despite his growing interest in politics, Johnson (with Payne) still published primarily religious works and the occasional travel narrative. As Tyson writes, "in the first decade of his career Johnson's significance as a bookseller derived from a desire to provide dissent (religious and political) a forum".

==== Fire ====
Johnson was on the verge of real success when his shop was ravaged by fire on 9 January 1770. As one London newspaper reported it:

Yesterday morning, between six and seven o'clock a fire broke out at Messrs. Johnson and Payne's, Booksellers, in Paternoster Row, which consumed that house, Mr. Cock's, Printer, and Mr. Upton's, an Auctioneer ... in which last mentioned house was kept the whole stock of Bibles, Common Prayers, Etc. belonging to the Proprietors of the Oxford Press ... It was a considerable time before the engines could be brought to play to any purpose, on account their being clogged by ice and snow. The several families were all in bed when the fire was first discovered, and Mr. Johnson had but just time to alarm his partner and the rest of the family, and they escaped, saving only some of their books of account, the whole stock in trade and furniture being destroyed.

At the time Fuseli had been living with Johnson and he also lost all of his possessions, including the first printing of his Remarks on the Writings and Conduct of J. J. Rousseau. Johnson and Payne subsequently dissolved their partnership. It was an amicable separation, and Johnson even published some of Payne's works in later years.

== 1770s: Establishment ==
By August 1770, just seven months after fire had destroyed his shop and goods, Johnson had re-established himself at 72 St. Paul's Churchyard – the largest shop on a street of booksellers – where he was to remain for the rest of his life. How Johnson managed this feat is unclear; he later cryptically told a friend that "his friends came about him, and set him up again". An early 19th-century biography states that "Mr. Johnson was now so well known, and had been so highly respected, that on this unfortunate occasion, his friends with one accord met, and contributed to enable him to begin business again". Chard speculates that Priestley assisted him since they were such close friends.

=== Religious publications and advocacy of Unitarianism ===
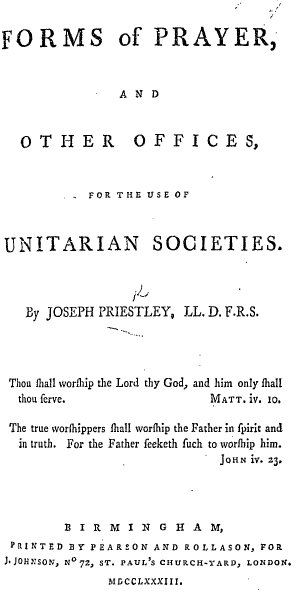
Forms of Prayer (1783) by Joseph Priestley, a Unitarian liturgy published by Joseph Johnson

Immediately upon reopening his business, Johnson started publishing theological and political works by Priestley and other Dissenters. Starting in the 1770s, Johnson published more specifically Unitarian works, as well as texts advocating religious toleration; he also became personally involved in the Unitarian cause. He served as a conduit for information between Dissenters across the country and supplied provincial publishers with religious publications, thereby enabling Dissenters to spread their beliefs easily. Johnson participated in efforts to repeal the Test and Corporation Acts, which restricted the civil rights of Dissenters. In one six-year period of the 1770s, Johnson was responsible for publishing nearly one-third of the Unitarian works on the issue. He continued his support in 1787, 1789, and 1790, when Dissenters introduced repeal bills in Parliament, and he published much of the pro-repeal literature written by Priestley and others.

Johnson was also instrumental in Theophilus Lindsey's founding of the first Unitarian chapel in London. With some difficulty, as Unitarians were feared at that time and their beliefs held illegal until the Doctrine of the Trinity Act 1813, Johnson obtained the building for Essex Street Chapel and, with the help of barrister John Lee, who later became Attorney-General, its licence. To capitalize on the opening of the new chapel in addition to helping out his friends, Johnson published Lindsey's inaugural sermon, which sold out in four days. Johnson continued to attend and participate actively in this congregation throughout his life. Lindsey and the church's other minister, John Disney, became two of Johnson's most active writers. In the 1780s, Johnson continued to advocate Unitarianism and published a series of controversial writings by Priestley arguing for its legitimacy. These writings did not make Johnson much money, but they agreed with his philosophy of open debate and religious toleration. Johnson also became the publisher for the Society for Promoting the Knowledge of the Scriptures, a Unitarian group determined to release new worship materials and commentaries on the Bible. (See British and Foreign Unitarian Association#Publishing.)

Although Johnson is known for publishing Unitarian works, particularly those of Priestley, he also published the works of other Dissenters, Anglicans, and Jews. The common thread uniting his disparate religious publications was religious toleration. For example, he published the Reverend George Gregory's 1787 English translation of Bishop Robert Lowth's seminal book on Hebrew poetry, De Sacra Poesi Hebraeorum. Gregory published several other works with Johnson, such as Essays Historical and Moral (1785) and Sermons with Thoughts on the Composition and Delivery of a Sermon (1787). Gregory exemplified the type of author that Johnson preferred to work with: industrious and liberal-minded, but not bent on self-glorification. Yet, as Helen Braithwaite writes in her study of Johnson, his "enlightened pluralistic approach was also seen by its opponents as inherently permissive, opening the door to all forms of unhealthy questioning and scepticism, and at odds with the stable virtues of established religion and authority".

=== American Revolution ===
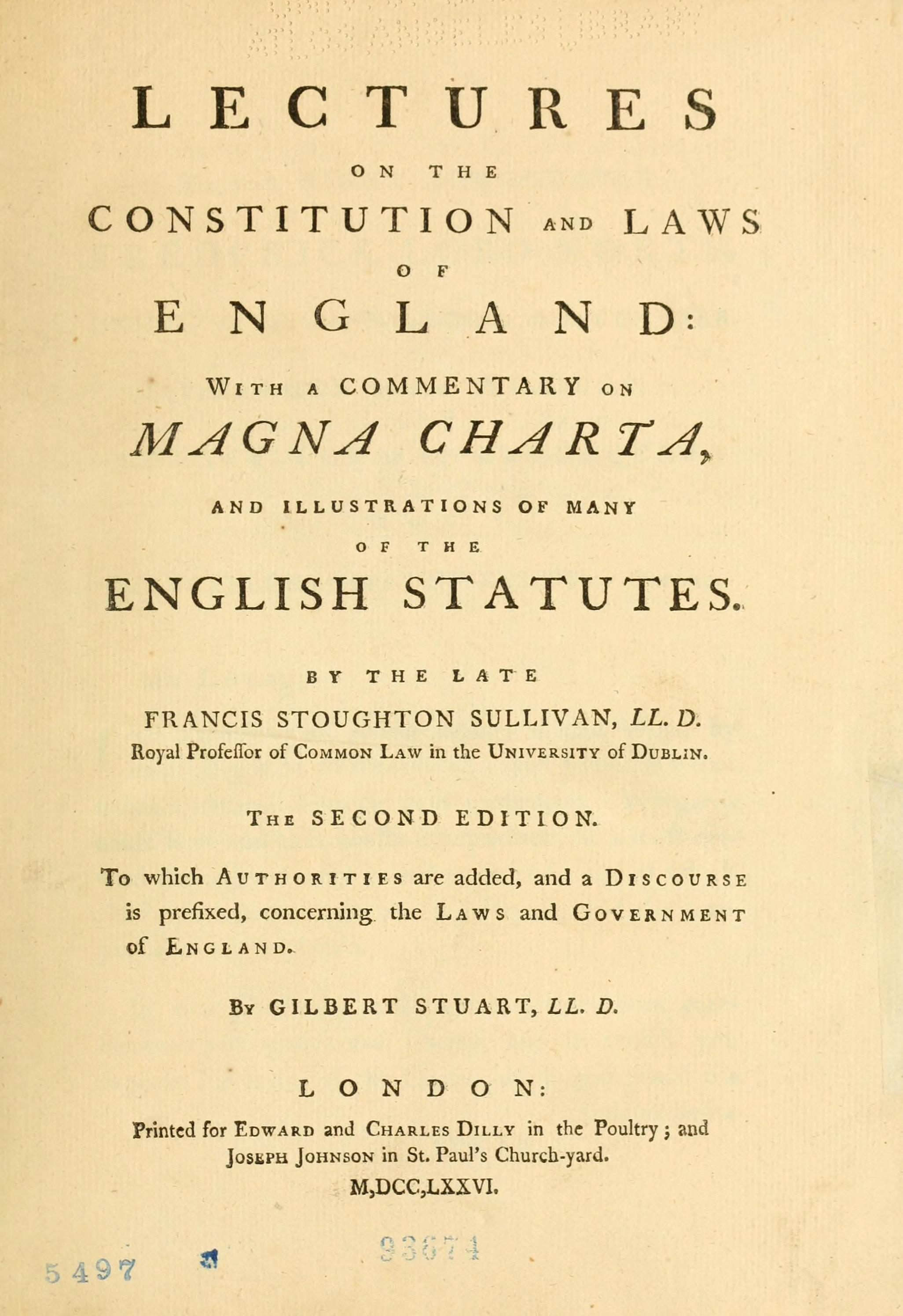
The second English edition of Francis Stoughton Sullivan's Lectures on the Constitution and Laws of England, published by Johnson in 1776

Partially as a result of his association with British Dissenters, Johnson became involved in publishing tracts and sermons in defence of the American revolutionaries. He began with Priestley's Address to Protestant Dissenters of All Denominations, on the Approaching Election of Members of Parliament (1774), which urged Dissenters to vote for candidates that guaranteed the American colonists their freedom. Johnson continued his series of anti-government, pro-American pamphlets by publishing Fast Day sermons by Joshua Toulmin, George Walker, Ebenezer Radcliff, and Newcome Cappe. Braithwaite describes these as "well-articulated critiques of government" that "were not only unusual but potentially subversive and disruptive", and she concludes that Johnson's decision to publish so much of this material indicates that he supported the political position it espoused. Moreover, Johnson published what Braithwaite calls "probably the most influential English defence of the colonists", Richard Price's Observations on the Nature of Civil Liberty (1776). Over 60,000 copies were sold in a year. In 1780 Johnson also issued the first collected political works of Benjamin Franklin in England, a political risk as the American colonies were in rebellion by that time. Johnson did not usually reprint colonial texts – his ties to the revolution were primarily through Dissenters. Thus, the works published by Johnson emphasized both colonial independence and the rights for which Dissenters were fighting – "the right to petition for redress of grievance, the maintenance and protection of equal civil rights, and the inalienable right to liberty of conscience".

=== Informative texts ===
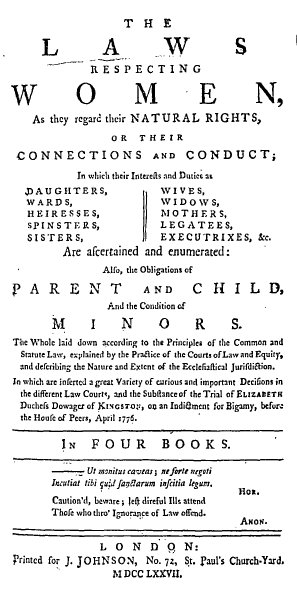
Laws Respecting Women (1777), published by Johnson

After 1770, Johnson began to publish a wider array of books, particularly scientific and medical texts. One of the most important was John Hunter's A Natural History of the Human Teeth, Part I (1771), which "elevated dentistry to the level of surgery". Johnson also supported doctors when they questioned the efficacy of cures, such as with John Millar in his Observations on Antimony (1774), which claimed that Dr James's Fever Powder was ineffective. This was a risky publication for Johnson, because this patent medicine was quite popular and his fellow bookseller John Newbery had made his fortune from selling it.

In 1777 Johnson published the anonymous Laws Respecting Women, as they Regard Their Natural Rights, often credited to Elizabeth Chudleigh, Countess of Bristol. The book explains, for the layperson, exactly what its title suggests. As Tyson comments, "the ultimate value of this book lies in its arming women with the knowledge of their legal rights in situations where they had traditionally been vulnerable because of ignorance". The publication helped Mary Wollstonecraft with the background for her feminist novel Maria: or, The Wrongs of Woman(1798).

==== Revolution in children's literature ====
Johnson also contributed significantly to children's literature. His publication of Barbauld's Lessons for Children (1778–79) spawned a revolution in the newly emerging genre. Its plain style, mother-child dialogues, and conversational tone inspired a generation of authors, such as Sarah Trimmer. Johnson encouraged other women to write in this genre, such as Charlotte Smith, but his recommendation always came with a caveat of how difficult it was to write well for children. For example, he wrote to Smith, "perhaps you cannot employ your time and extraordinary talents more usefully for the public & your self [sic], than in composing books for children and young people, but I am very sensible it is extreamly [sic] difficult to acquire that simplicity of style which is their great recommendation". He also advised William Godwin and his second wife, Mary Jane Clairmont, on the publication of their Juvenile Library (started in 1805). Not only did Johnson encourage the writing of British children's literature, but he also helped sponsor the translation and publication of popular French works such as Arnaud Berquin's L'Ami des Enfans (1782–83).

In addition to books for children, Johnson published schoolbooks and textbooks for autodidacts, such as John Hewlett's Introduction to Spelling and Reading (1786), William Nicholson's Introduction to Natural Philosophy (1782), and his friend John Bonnycastle's An Introduction to Mensuration and Practical Mathematics (1782). Johnson also published books on education and childrearing, such as Wollstonecraft's first book, Thoughts on the Education of Daughters (1787).

By the end of the 1770s, Johnson had become an established publisher. Writers – particularly Dissenters – sought him out, and his home started to become the centre of a radical and stimulating intellectual milieu. Because he was willing to publish multiple opinions on issues, he was respected as a publisher by writers from across the political spectrum. Johnson published many Unitarian works, but he also issued works criticizing them; although he was an abolitionist, he also published works arguing in favour of the slave trade; he supported inoculation, but he also published works critical of the practice.

== 1780s: Success ==
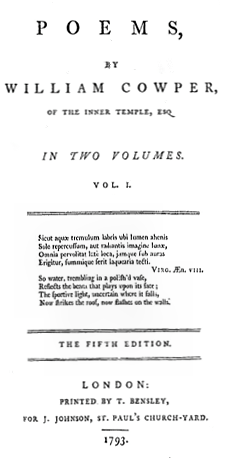
Despite having bought the copyright, Johnson generously gave William Cowper the profits from this fifth edition of the poet's Poems.

During the 1780s, Johnson achieved success: he did well financially, and his firm published more books with other firms. Although Johnson had begun his career as a relatively cautious publisher of religious and scientific tracts, he was now able to take more risks and he encouraged friends to recommend works to him, creating a network of informal reviewers. Yet Johnson's business was never large; he usually had only one assistant and never took on an apprentice. Only in the last years of his life did two relatives assist him.

=== Literature ===
Once Johnson's financial situation had become secure, he began to publish literary authors, most famously the poet William Cowper. Johnson issued Cowper's Poems (1782) and The Task (1784) at his own expense (a generous action at a time when authors were often forced to take on the risk of publication) and was rewarded with handsome sales of both volumes. Johnson published many of Cowper's works, including the anonymous satire Anti-thelyphora (1780), which mocked the work of Cowper's own cousin, the Rev. Martin Madan, who had advocated polygamy as a solution for prostitution. Johnson even edited and critiqued Cowper's poetry in manuscript, "much to the advantage of the poems" according to Cowper. In 1791, Johnson published Cowper's translations of the Homeric epics (extensively edited and corrected by Fuseli) and three years after Cowper's death in 1800, Johnson published a biography of the poet by William Hayley.

Johnson never published much "creative literature"; Chard attributes this to "a lingering Calvinistic hostility to 'imaginative' literature". Most of the literary works Johnson published were religious or didactic. Some of his most popular productions in this vein were anthologies; the most famous is probably William Enfield's The Speaker (1774), which went through multiple editions and spawned many imitations, such as Wollstonecraft's The Female Speaker.

=== Medical and scientific publications ===
Johnson continued his interest in publishing practical medical texts in the 1780s and 1790s; during the 1780s, he brought out some of his most significant works in this area. According to Johnson's friend, the physician John Aikin, he intentionally established one of his first shops on "the track of the Medical Students resorting to the Hospitals in the Borough", where they would be sure to see his wares, which helped to establish him in medical publishing. Johnson published the works of the scientist-Dissenters he met through Priestley and Barbauld, such as Thomas Beddoes and Thomas Young. He issued the children's book on birds produced by the industrialist Samuel Galton and the Lunar Society's translation of Linnaeus's System of Vegetables (1783). He also published works by James Edward Smith, "the botanist who brought the Linnaean system to England".

In 1784, Johnson issued John Haygarth's An Inquiry How to Prevent Small-Pox, which furthered the understanding and treatment of smallpox. Johnson published several subsequent works by Haygarth that promoted inoculation (and later vaccination) for the healthy, as well as quarantining for the sick. He also published the work of James Earle, a prominent surgeon, whose significant book on lithotomy was illustrated by William Blake, and Matthew Baillie's Morbid Anatomy (1793), "the first text of pathology devoted to that science exclusively by systematic arrangement and design".

Not only did Johnson publish the majority of Priestley's theological works, but he also published his scientific works, such as Experiments and Observations on Different Kinds of Air (1774–77) in which Priestley announced his discovery of oxygen. Johnson also published the works of Carl Wilhelm Scheele and Antoine Lavoisier, both of whom made their own claims of having discovered oxygen. When Lavoisier began to publish works in France on the "new chemistry" that he had developed (which included today's modern notions of element and compound), Johnson had these translated and printed immediately, despite his association with Priestley who argued strenuously against Lavoisier's new system. Johnson was the first to publish an English edition of Lavoisier's early writings on chemistry and he kept up with the ongoing debate. These works did well for Johnson and increased his visibility among men of science.

=== Johnson Circle and dinners ===
With time, Johnson's home became a nexus for radical thinkers, who appreciated his open-mindedness, generous spirit, and humanitarianism. Although usually separated by geography, such thinkers would meet and debate with one another at Johnson's house in London, often over dinner. This network not only brought authors into contact with each other, it also brought new writers to Johnson's business. For example, Priestley introduced John Newton to Johnson, Newton brought John Hewlett, and Hewlett invited Mary Wollstonecraft, who in turn attracted Mary Hays who brought William Godwin. With this broad network of acquaintances and reputation for free-thinking publications, Johnson became the favourite publisher of a generation of writers and thinkers. By bringing inventive, thoughtful people together, he "stood at the very heart of British intellectual life" for over twenty years. Importantly, Johnson's circle was not made up entirely of either liberals or radicals. Chard emphasizes that it "was held together less by political liberalism than by a common interest in ideas, free enquiry, and creative expression in various fields".

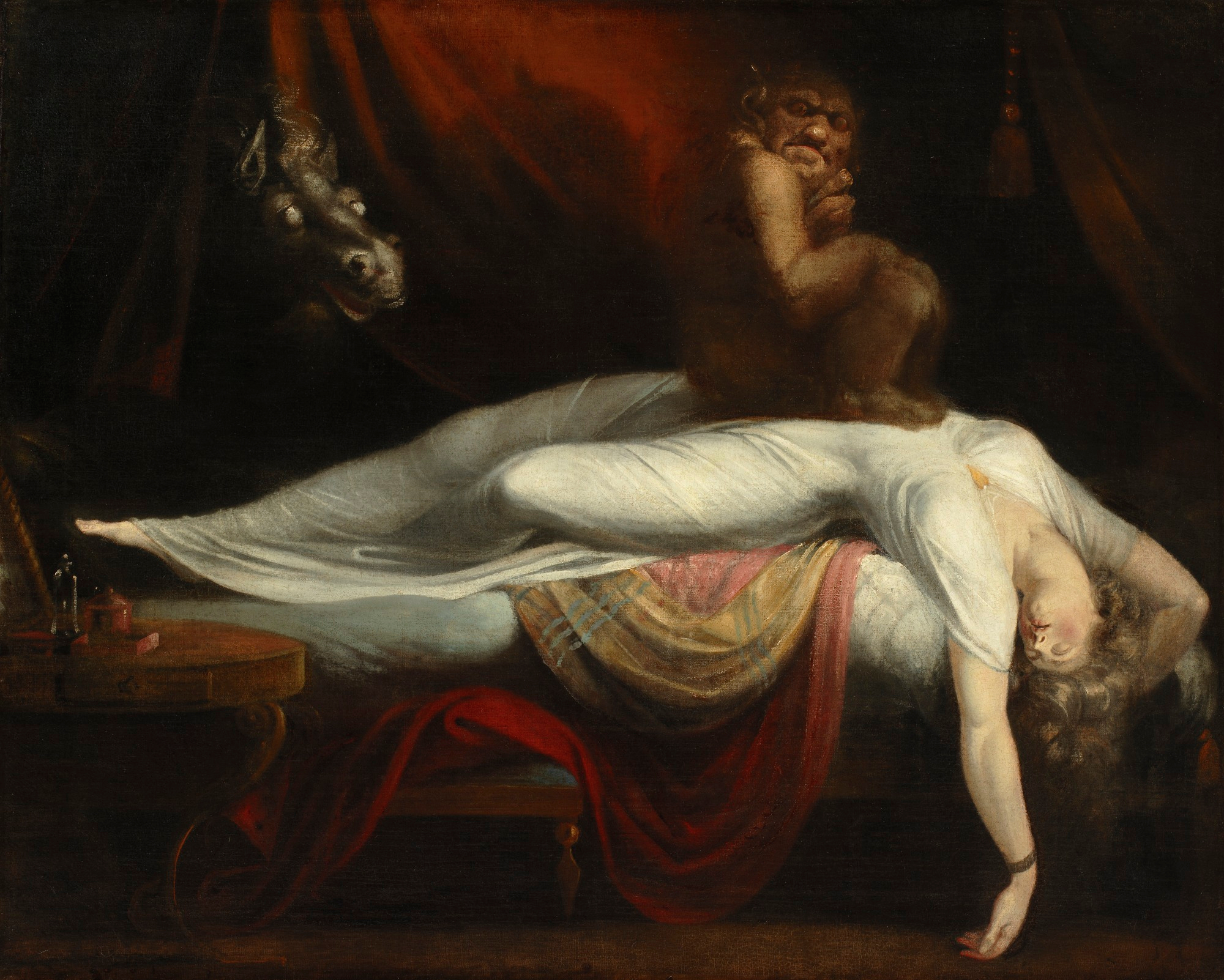
Along with the portrait of Priestley (pictured above), The Nightmare by Henry Fuseli (1781) hung above Johnson's dinner guests.

As Tyson notes, although "Johnson's circle" is usually used in the singular, there were at least two such "circles". The first was made up of a group of London associates: Fuseli, Gregory, Bonnycastle, and Geddes. The second consisted of Johnson's writers from farther afield, such as Priestley, Thomas Henry, Thomas Percival, Barbauld, Aikin, and Enfield. Later, more radicals would join, including Wollstonecraft, Wakefield, John Horne Tooke, and Thomas Christie.

Johnson's dinners became legendary and it appears, from evidence collected from diaries, that a large number of people attended each one. Although there were few regulars, except perhaps for Johnson's close London friends (Fuseli, Bonnycastle and, later, Godwin), the large number of high-profile guests, including Thomas Paine, attests to the reputation of these dinners. The enjoyment and intellectual stimulation that these dinners provided is evidenced by the numerous references to them in diaries and letters. Barbauld wrote to her brother in 1784 that "our evenings, particularly at Johnson's, were so truly social and lively, that we protracted them sometimes till – but I am not telling tales." At one dinner in 1791, Godwin records that the conversation focused on "monarch, Tooke, [Samuel] Johnson, Voltaire, pursuits, and religion" [emphasis Godwin's]. Although the conversation was stimulating, Johnson apparently only served his guests simple meals, such as boiled cod, veal, vegetables, and rice pudding. Many of the people that met at these dinners became fast friends, as did Fuseli and Bonnycastle; Godwin and Wollstonecraft eventually married.

=== Friendship with Mary Wollstonecraft ===
The friendship between Johnson and Mary Wollstonecraft was pivotal in both of their lives and illustrates the active role that Johnson played in developing writing talent. In 1787, Wollstonecraft was in financial straits: she had just been dismissed from a governess position in Ireland and had moved back to London. She had resolved to be an author in an era that afforded few professional opportunities to women. After Unitarian schoolteacher John Hewlett suggested to Wollstonecraft that she submit her writings to Johnson, an enduring and mutually supportive relationship blossomed between Johnson and Wollstonecraft. He dealt with her creditors, secured lodgings for her, and advanced payment on her first book, Thoughts on the Education of Daughters (1787), and her first novel, Mary: A Fiction (1788). Johnson included Wollstonecraft in the exalted company of his weekly soirées, where she met famous personages, such as Thomas Paine and her future husband, William Godwin. Wollstonecraft, who is believed to have written some 200 articles for his periodical, the Analytical Review, regarded Johnson as a true friend. After a disagreement, she sent him the following note the next morning:

You made me very low-spirited last night, by your manner of talking – You are my only friend – the only person I am intimate with. – I never had a father, or a brother – you have been both to me, ever since I knew you – yet I have sometimes been very petulant. – I have been thinking of those instances of ill-humour and quickness, and they appeared like crimes. Yours sincerely, Mary.

Johnson offered Wollstonecraft work as a translator, prompting her to learn French and German. More importantly, Johnson provided encouragement at crucial moments during the writing of her seminal political treatises A Vindication of the Rights of Men (1790) and A Vindication of the Rights of Woman (1792).

== 1790s: Years of radicalism ==
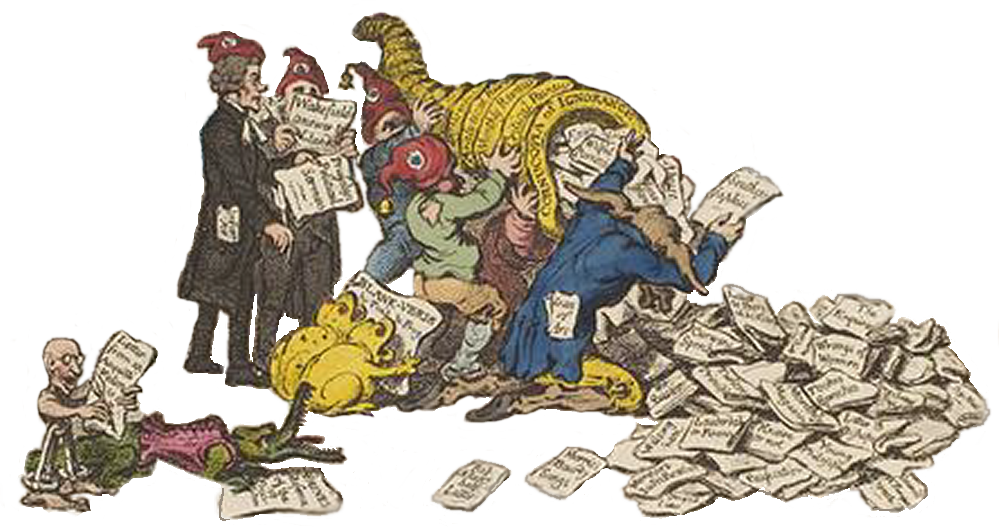
Detail from James Gillray's political cartoon New Morality published in the Anti-Jacobin Review (1798); most of the radical pamphlets issuing from the "cornucopia of ignorance" were published by Johnson: Darwin, Wakefield, Horne Tooke, Paine, Coleridge, Priestley, and others.

As radicalism took hold in Britain in the 1790s, Johnson became increasingly involved in its causes: he was a member of the Society for Constitutional Information, which was attempting to reform Parliament; he published works defending Dissenters after the religiously motivated Birmingham Riots in 1791; and he testified on behalf of those arrested during the 1794 Treason Trials. Johnson published works championing the rights of slaves, Jews, women, prisoners, Dissenters, chimney sweeps, abused animals, university students forbidden from marrying, victims of press gangs, and those unjustly accused of violating the game laws.

Political literature became Johnson's mainstay in the 1790s: he published 118 works, which amounted to 57% of his total political output. As Chard notes, "hardly a year went by without at least one anti-war and one anti-slave trade publication from Johnson". In particular, Johnson published abolitionist works, such as minister and former slave-ship captain John Newton's Thoughts Upon the African Slave Trade (1788), Barbauld's Epistle to William Wilberforce (1791), and Captain John Gabriel Stedman's Narrative, of a Five Years' Expedition, Against the Revolted Negroes of Surinam (1796) (with illustrations by Blake). Most importantly he helped organize the publication of The Interesting Narrative of the Life of Olaudah Equiano (1789), the autobiography of former slave Olaudah Equiano.

Later in the decade, Johnson focused on works about the French Revolution, concentrating on those from France itself, but he also published commentary from America by Thomas Jefferson and James Monroe. Johnson's determination to publish political and revolutionary works, however, fractured his Circles: Dissenters were alienated from Anglicans during efforts to repeal the Test and Corporation Acts and moderates split from radicals during the French revolution. Johnson lost customers, friends, and writers, including the children's author Sarah Trimmer. Braithwaite speculates that Johnson also lost business due to his willingness to put out works that promoted the "challenging new historicist versions of the scriptures", such as those by Alexander Geddes.

Johnson refused to publish Paine's Rights of Man and William Blake's The French Revolution, for example. It is almost impossible to determine Johnson's own personal political beliefs from the historical record. Marilyn Gaull argues that "if Johnson were radical, indeed if he had any political affiliation ... it was accidental". Gaull describes Johnson's "liberalism" as that "of [a] generous, open, fair-minded, unbiased defender of causes lost and won". His real contribution, she contends, was "as a disseminator of contemporary knowledge, especially science, medicine, and pedagogical practice" and as an advocate for a popular style. He encouraged all of his writers to use "plain syntax and colloquial diction" so that "self-educated readers" could understand his publications. Johnson's association with writers such as Godwin has previously been used to emphasize his radicalism, but Braithwaite points out that Godwin only became a part of Johnson's Circle late in the 1790s; Johnson's closest friends – Priestley, Fuseli, and Bonnycastle – were much more politically moderate. Johnson was not a populist or democratic bookseller: he catered to the self-educating middle class.

=== Revolution controversy ===
In 1790, with the publication of his Reflections on the Revolution in France, philosopher and statesman Edmund Burke launched the first volley of a vicious pamphlet war in what became known as the Revolution Controversy. Because he had supported the American Revolution, friends and enemies alike expected him to support the French Revolution. His book, which decries the French Revolution, therefore came as a shock to nearly everyone. Priced at an expensive five shillings, it still sold over 10,000 copies in a few weeks. Reformers, particularly Dissenters, felt compelled to reply. Johnson's periodical, the Analytical Review, published a summary and review of Burke's work within a couple of weeks of its publication. Two weeks later, Wollstonecraft responded to Burke with her Vindication of the Rights of Men. In issuing one of the first and cheapest replies to Burke (Vindication cost only one shilling), Johnson put himself at some risk. Thomas Cooper, who had also written a response to Burke, was later informed by the Attorney General that "although there was no exception to be taken to his pamphlet when in the hands of the upper classes, yet the government would not allow it to appear at a price which would insure its circulation among the people". Many others soon joined in the fray and Johnson remained at the centre of the maelstrom. By Braithwaite's count, Johnson published or sold roughly a quarter of the works responding to Burke within the following year.

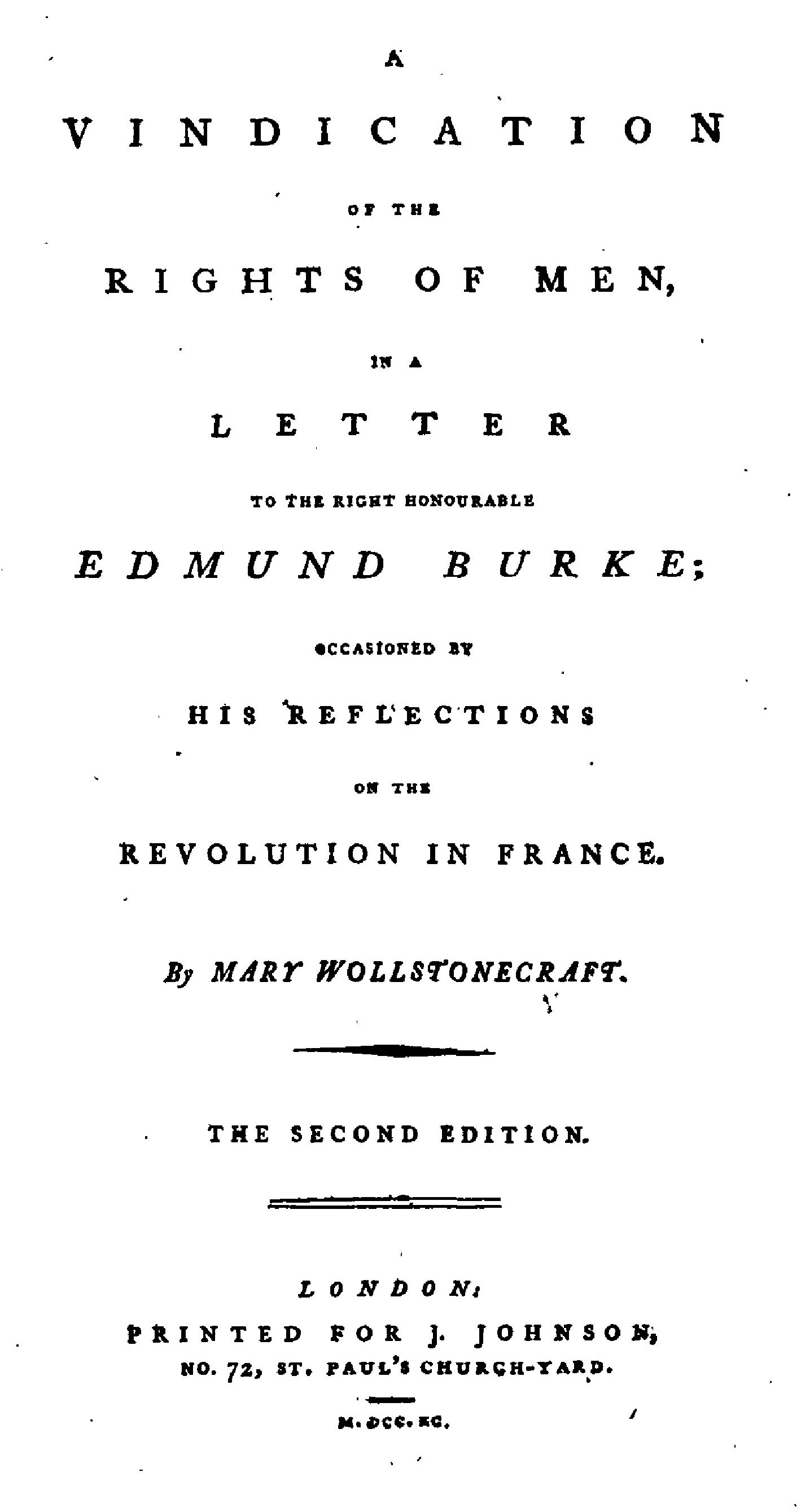
Title page from the second edition of Mary Wollstonecraft's A Vindication of the Rights of Men (1790), the first to have her name on it

The most notable of all of these responses was Thomas Paine's Rights of Man. Johnson originally agreed to publish the controversial work, but he backed out later for unknown reasons and J. S. Jordan distributed it (and was subsequently tried and imprisoned for its publication). Braithwaite speculates that Johnson did not agree with Paine's radical republican statements and was more interested in promoting the rights of Dissenters outlined in the other works he published. After the initial risk was taken by Jordan, however, Johnson published Paine's work in an expensive edition, which was unlikely to be challenged at law. Yet, when Paine was himself later arrested, Johnson helped raise funds to bail him out and hid him from the authorities. A contemporary satire suggested that Johnson saved Paine from imprisonment:

The time may come when J – n's aid may fail;
Nor clubs combin'd preserve thee from a jail.

Alarmed at the popular appeal of Paine's Rights of Man, the king issued a proclamation against seditious writings in May 1792. Booksellers and printers bore the brunt of this law, the effects of which came to a head in the 1794 Treason Trials. Johnson testified, publicly distancing himself from Paine and Barlow, despite the fact that the defendants were received sympathetically by the juries.

=== Poetry ===
During the 1790s alone, Johnson published 103 volumes of poetry – 37% of his entire output in the genre. The bestselling poetical works of Cowper and Erasmus Darwin enriched Johnson's firm. Darwin's innovative The Botanic Garden (1791) was particularly successful: Johnson paid him 1,000 guineas before it was ever released and bought the copyright from him for £800, a staggeringly large sum. The poem contains three "interludes" in the form of dialogues between a poet and his bookseller. The bookseller asks the poet what Tyson calls "leading questions" in order to elucidate the poet's theory of poetry. Tyson comments "that although the flat questions of the practical-minded bookseller may be meant to parody Johnson's manner, most likely Darwin did not have him or any other particular bookseller in mind". After the success of The Botanic Garden, Johnson published Darwin's work on evolution, Zoonomia (1794–96); his treatise A Plan on the Conduct of Female Education (1797); Phytologia; or, the Philosophy of Agriculture and Gardening (1800); and his poem The Temple of Nature (1803). According to Braithwaite, The Temple of Nature was Zoonomia in verse and "horrified reviewers with its warring, factious, overly materialistic view of the universe".

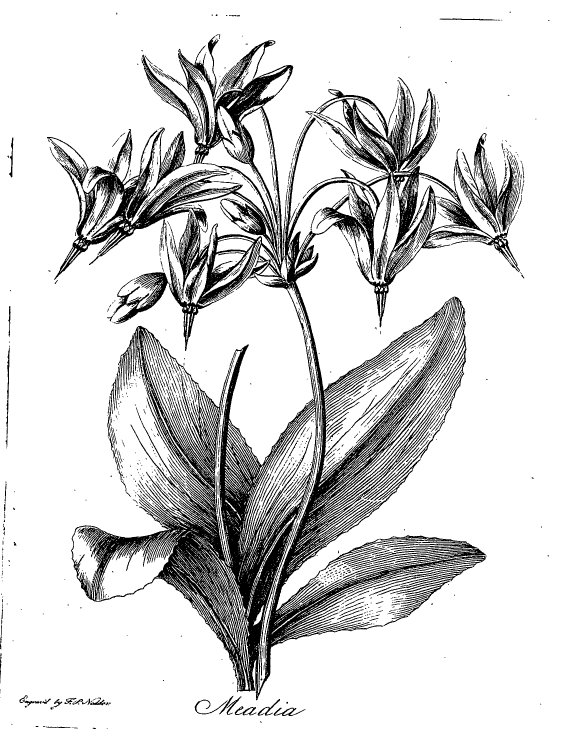
Plate engraved by William Blake for Erasmus Darwin's The Botanic Garden (1791) MEADIA's soft chains five suppliant beaux confess, And hand in hand the laughing belle address; Alike to all, she bows with wanton air, Rolls her dark eye, and waves her golden hair. (I.61–64)

Johnson continued to publish the poetic works of Aikin and Barbauld as well as those of George Dyer, Joseph Fawcett, James Hurdis, Joel Barlow, Ann Batten Cristall and Edward Williams. Most of the poets that Johnson promoted and published are not remembered today. However, in 1793, Johnson published William Wordsworth's An Evening Walk and Descriptive Sketches; he remained Wordsworth's publisher until a disagreement separated them in 1799. Johnson also put out Samuel Taylor Coleridge's Fears in Solitude (1798). They were apparently close enough friends for Coleridge to leave his books at Johnson's shop when he toured Europe.

Johnson had a working relationship with illustrator William Blake for nearly twenty years: Johnson commissioned around 100 engravings from Blake – more than any other publisher – including the second edition of Wollstonecraft's Original Stories from Real Life (1791) and Darwin's Botanic Garden. Johnson may also have had some connection with Blake as a writer, judging from galley proofs of his French Revolution (1791). Yet, in An Island in the Moon, Blake represents Johnson as "a bookseller without aesthetic values whose repetitive questions reveal his ignorance".

=== Translations ===
Johnson facilitated the translation of educational texts, serious fiction, and philosophy (he was less interested in translating popular novels). In particular, he promoted the translation of the works of persecuted French Girondins, such as Condorcet's Outlines of an Historical View of the Progress of the Human Mind (1795) and Madame Roland's An Appeal to Impartial Posterity (1795), which he had released in English within weeks of its debut in France. His publication of a translation of Constanin Volney's deistic Les Ruines, ou méditations sur les révolutions des empires (1791) quickly became a bestseller. Johnson also had some of the most prominent French children's literature translated, such as the works of Madame de Genlis.

Johnson's most significant contribution in this area was his promotion of German-language literature. Fuseli encouraged him to publish translations of important new German authors, such as Goethe and Schiller. Johnson was one of the few British publishers arranging for the translation of German moral philosophy in the 1790s, and his most important translated publication was arguably Johann Herder's Ideen zur Philosophie der Geschichte der Menschheit (1776), which introduced many of the historical and anthropological methods of thought already present on the Continent to Britons. Instead of attempting to faithfully reproduce texts, almost all of Johnson's translators followed the 18th-century practice of freely adapting their texts, for example by substituting "British" counterparts of "German" examples.

=== Analytical Review and other periodicals ===
Johnson's first periodicals, Gospel Magazine (1766–?), The Universal Museum and Complete Magazine (1765–1770), and The Monthly Record of Literature (1767), like many 18th-century journals, lasted only a short while, but his later attempts were much more successful. In 1783, he financed the first quarterly medical periodical in London, the London Medical Journal, founded by Samuel Foart Simmons, a prominent physician. Explaining the journal's goals, Simmons wrote that it would provide "an account of new medical books and useful discoveries in physic, and at the same time be a repository for original essays". The journal lasted until 1790 when it was replaced by another Johnson-Simmons venture, Medical Facts and Observations, which ran until 1797.

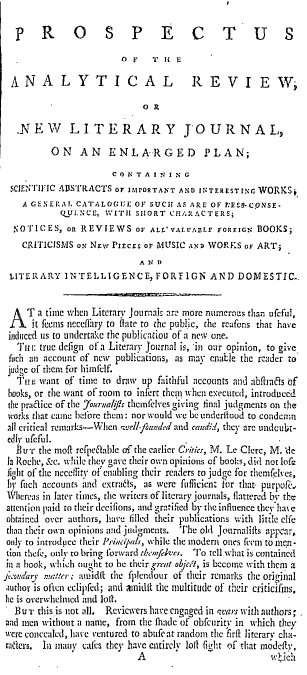
Prospectus for the Analytical Review (1788), part of the Republic of Letters

In 1788, Johnson and Thomas Christie, a Unitarian, liberal, and classicist, founded the Analytical Review. It was a gadfly publication, which offered readers a summary and analysis of the flood of new publications issuing from the presses at the end of the 18th century and provided a forum for radical political and religious ideas. Although it aimed at impartiality, its articles were often critical of the Pitt administration and supportive of the French revolutionaries. Tyson calls it "the most outspoken journal of its day", but Chard argues that it was "never particularly strident and certainly not radical". It was also instrumental in promoting scientific, philosophical, and literary foreign-language publications, particularly those in German and French. Compared to Johnson's earlier periodicals, which were generally "marginal sectarian efforts", the Analytical Review was quite popular. At 1,500 copies per issue, it did not have the circulation of the Gentleman's Magazine, which averaged around 4,550, but it was influential despite its more limited readership. Its conservative counterpart and nemesis was the Anti-Jacobin Review, established specifically to counteract the effects of the Analytical and other radical media outlets. The Analytical was suspended at the end of 1798 following the deaths of Christie and Wollstonecraft in 1796 and 1797 respectively, and the retirement of other contributing editors.

In 1796 Johnson joined in a venture to start The Monthly Magazine. Founded by his neighbour Richard Phillips and edited by his friend John Aikin, it was associated with Dissenting interests and was responsible for importing much German philosophical thought into England. According to Marilyn Butler, it "combined many of the best features of the periodicals of the century. It was a miscellany, but more intellectual and much more bookish than the [Gentleman's Magazine]; hospitable to readers, it nevertheless high-mindedly projected an ideal of liberal, middle-class intellectuality that anticipates both the innovative writing and projected readership" of Blackwood's and Fraser's.

=== Changing political winds ===
With the beginning of the violence of the Reign of Terror (1793–94), those in Britain who had initially supported the French Revolution began to rethink their position and the government became increasingly concerned about the possibility of a British revolution akin to that of the French. The ardour of radicalism that had prevailed in the early 1790s dissipated. Booksellers were arrested and tried for seditious libel, and many of Johnson's authors either stopped writing or became more conservative. Only a few, like Paine, veered further left. After being forced to testify at the trial of Paine and Thomas Hardy, Johnson published fewer incendiary works, among them Joel Barlow's Advice to the Privileged Orders (1792). Braithwaite describes it as "without doubt the most extreme that Joseph Johnson ever published (taking him immoderately close to what he later, jokingly, described as a 'hanging' offence)". However, once it became clear that Barlow, like Paine, was becoming radicalized, Johnson refused to publish any more of his works. In 1794 Johnson even considered emigrating to America with Priestley to escape the increasing pressure he felt from conservatives and the government.

==== 1798: Trial and imprisonment ====
Following the publication of Paine's provocative Rights of Man in 1791, a sedition law was passed in Britain and, in 1798, Johnson and several others were put on trial for selling Gilbert Wakefield's A Reply to Some Parts of the Bishop Llandaff's Address to the People of Great Britain, a Unitarian work attacking the privileged position of the wealthy. The indictment against Johnson, written on a six-foot parchment roll, read in part:

The said Attorney General of our said Lord the King ... giveth the Court here further to understand and be informed that Joseph Johnson late of London bookseller being a malicious, seditious, and ill-disposed person and being greatly disaffected to our said sovereign Lord the King ... wickedly maliciously and seditiously did publish and cause to be published a certain scandalous malicious and seditious libel.

King's Bench Prison, by Augustus Pugin and Thomas Rowlandson (1808–11), where Johnson served out his six-month sentence. He was able to catch up on his accounts while in prison and collected long-owed debts from authors.

Braithwaite explains, "an English jury, in effect, was being asked to consider whether Joseph Johnson's intentions as a bookseller were really as dangerous and radical as those of Thomas Paine". An issue of the Analytical Review was even offered as evidence against Johnson. Despite having retained Thomas Erskine as his lawyer, who had successfully defended Hardy and Horne Tooke at the 1794 Treason Trials, and character references from George Fordyce, Aikin, and Hewlett, Johnson was fined £50 and sentenced to six months imprisonment at King's Bench Prison in February 1799. Braithwaite speculates:

If the conduct of the Attorney-General and the Anti-Jacobin are to serve as any kind of barometer of government opinion, then other scores were clearly being settled and it was not merely for [Johnson's] involvement in the sale of Wakefield's pamphlet but his tenure ... as a stubbornly independent-minded publisher in St Paul's Churchyard, prominently serving the irreligious and unconstitutional interests of 'rational' dissent and dangerously sympathetic to the ideas of foreigners (most visibly through the pages of the Analytical) that Joseph Johnson was ultimately being brought to book.

Johnson's friends accused Erskine of using the trial as a political platform and not thinking of the best interests of his client. Johnson's imprisonment was not harsh; being relatively wealthy, Johnson rented a home for himself within the prison, where he continued to hold his weekly soirées.

Although Johnson still believed in the free exchange of ideas and was not embittered by his stay in prison, his publishing habits changed dramatically. After he was released, Johnson published very few political works and none were controversial. Other booksellers followed suit, and Johnson's friend, Unitarian minister Theophilus Lindsey, wrote that "Johnson's fate deters them all". Johnson lost authors after the trial and experienced a noticeable decline in business. Furthermore, he gained fewer new authors, his stalwarts like Priestley began to complain that he was not attending to their business, and he was forced to cease publishing the Analytical Review.

== 1800s: Declining years and death ==
As publishing began to change its form in the late 18th and early 19th centuries, large publishing houses pushed out small, independent booksellers. Johnson did not attempt to form or join one of these new firms. In the late 1790s and early 19th century, Johnson's business declined, particularly as his relatives, John Miles and Roland Hunter, began to take over the daily operations; Miles was uninterested in the business, and Hunter did not have Johnson's commercial sense or his ability to choose successful manuscripts. In January 1806, Johnson's premises were wracked by a second fire, destroying the building and all of his stock.

Although not as active in routine business, Johnson still took an interest in political events. For example, he spearheaded the efforts of the booksellers of London and Westminster to appeal a new copyright law in 1808. Moreover, although Johnson did not publish controversial political works after his imprisonment, he still undertook important publishing ventures. For example, he administered the publication of a forty-five-volume work entitled The British Essayists, edited by Alexander Chalmers; the complete works of Samuel Johnson; and a ten-volume set of Shakespeare. Johnson published in more congers during the last decade of his life than at any other time. He also occasionally published important new authors, such as the political economist Thomas Malthus, whose Essay on the Principle of Population (1798) sparked a long debate between idealists and pragmatists. His emphasis on educational books continued or even increased as his interest in publishing contentious political works diminished. He also continued to support his friends, as with Godwin, who needed financial rescue after his play, Faulkener, cost him £800.

Johnson's authors became increasingly frustrated with him towards the end of his life, Wakefield calling him "heedless, insipid, [and] inactive" and Lindsey describing him as "a worthy and most honest man, but incorrigably [sic] neglectful often to his own detriment". Priestley, by then in Pennsylvania, eventually broke off his forty-year relationship with the publisher, when his book orders were delayed several years and Johnson failed to communicate with him regarding the publication of his works. Most of the authors who became upset with Johnson were those writing religious or literary works, the riskiest publishing ventures.

=== Death ===
Afflicted by a "chronic respiratory disease" for many years, Johnson died at his home and office on 20 December 1809, at the age of 71. The exact nature of his malady is unclear, but his great-nephew Miles wrote to Maria Edgeworth that Johnson was incapacitated with "spasms" and "asthma" near the end of his life. Never having married, he bequeathed his business concerns to his great-nephews, Hunter and Miles (Hunter took over the business, but could not retain Johnson's impressive author list and floundered due to his lack of business "acumen"). Johnson's remaining £60,000 fortune was shared among friends and family: for example, he willed a £200 annuity to Fanny Imlay, daughter of Mary Wollstonecraft, and £100 to one of Joseph Priestley's sons. Johnson was buried at Fulham, where he had rented a country home since 1804, under an epitaph by his life-long friend Henry Fuseli:

Beneficent without ostentation, ever ready to produce merit and to relieve distress;
Unassuming in prosperity, not appalled by misfortune;
Inexorable to his own, indulgent to the wants of others;
Resigned and cheerful under the torture and malady which he saw gradually destroy his life.

According to Chard, Johnson's obituaries, both those written by his friends and those not, "consistently stress his generosity and his principles", particularly his integrity. William Godwin's obituary of 21 December 1809 in the Morning Chronicle was particularly eloquent, calling Johnson an "ornament to his profession" and praising his modesty, his warm heart, and the integrity and clarity of his mind.

== Legacy ==
Wretches there are, their lucky stars who bless
Whene'er they find a genius in distress;
Who starve the bard, and stunt his growing Fame
Lest they should pay the value for his name.
But JOHNSON rais'd the drooping bard from Earth
And fostered rising Genius from his birth:
His lib'ral spirit a Profession made,
Of what with vulgar souls is vulgar Trade.

— Maria Edgeworth, unpublished eulogy (1810)

Johnson published more books in more fields than any other publisher of his time: "virtually every giant of the second half of the eighteenth century in medicine, science, religion, philosophy, political thought, education, and poetry published at least one work with Johnson". Johnson's publications helped to "demystify medicine" for the public and were integral to the Scientific Revolution. His periodical, the Analytical Review, can be seen as a precursor to the New Statesman. By the end of his career, Johnson had acquired a majority or monopoly share in the ownership of the works of: Shakespeare, Milton, Alexander Pope, Joseph Addison, Richard Steele, Samuel Johnson, and all of the major novelists of the period (except Samuel Richardson).

Johnson was known for fostering the development of new writers without worrying about maximizing profits, and for printing works on principle, even if he knew they would make little money. His risky publication of Joel Barlow's Advice to the Privileged Orders (1792), for example, sold 600 copies and barely broke even. He was also instrumental in the creation of the female professional writer, a role that began opening to women only at the end of the 18th century in Britain. By nurturing the writings of Anna Laetitia Barbauld, Charlotte Smith, Mary Hays, Mary Wollstonecraft, and Maria Edgeworth, he gave women the opportunity to demonstrate that they could be both successful and significant authors. Additionally, he published works promoting women's equality, such as Hays's An Appeal to the Men of Great Britain (1798), which called for an end to the tyrannical rule of men over women; Johnson's Analytical Review reviewed the work extensively and approvingly.

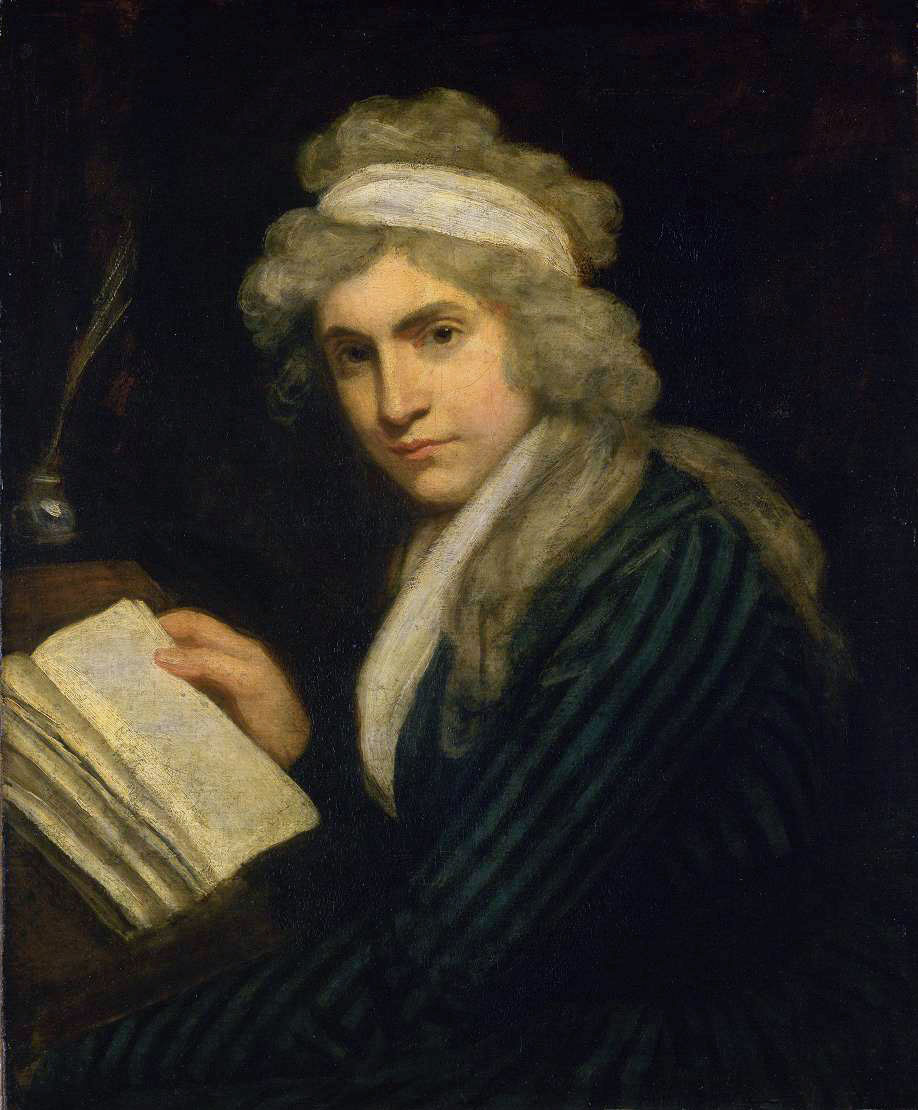
Mary Wollstonecraft, by John Opie (c. 1791), one of the women writers Johnson promoted and assisted, who thought of him as a brother and a father

Johnson was remarkably adept at recognizing new writing talent and making innovative works appealing to the public. More importantly, he functioned as a catalyst for experimentation by bringing disparate authors together. While Johnson promoted his authors, he retreated into the background himself. His friend John Aikin explained that he had "a decided aversion to all sorts of puffing and parade"; Johnson's unassuming character has left historians and literary critics sparse material from which to reconstruct his life. For 200 years, it was assumed that all of Johnson's business records and correspondence had been destroyed, but in the early 1990s, one of his "letter books" was discovered in an old desk. It contained copies of letters written to business associates as well as friends from 1795 to 1809. His letters to other publishers discuss "paper, printing, engraving costs, delivery dates, breaches of copyright, binding charges and accounts" whereas his letters to friends include missives to Priestley, Maria Edgeworth, Erasmus Darwin, Charlotte Smith, and others. This material has allowed scholars to theorize more concretely about Johnson's life and work.

Johnson's publications were rarely luxury goods: he priced his merchandise competitively, but always within the reach of the middle class, the audience he most wanted to serve. One way that he reduced costs was by printing texts in the provinces and then importing them to London; many of Priestley's works, for example, were printed locally in Birmingham. Johnson did not take great care with the printing of many of his books; they are full of errors and poorly bound. But as they were often printed extremely quickly to respond to a particular event, this was expected by his contemporaries.

Before Johnson's generation of booksellers, publishers were not highly respected; Johnson's sterling reputation helped publishing to become a more reputable business. His advocacy of cheap books, his desire to foster extensive provincial and foreign connections are all a part of why Johnson has been called "the most important publisher in England from 1770 until 1810".

== Publishing statistics ==
According to Chard, in the 48 years of his career, Johnson published around 2,700 imprints, averaging 56 per year. About half of these were pamphlets (e.g. sermons, religious tracts, political leaflets) and many were reprints; therefore he averaged around 20 to 30 new books per year. About 25% of his publications were of anonymous authors; these were usually political or religious works. He published more religious works than any other genre (1,067 titles). Johnson made roughly 750 copies for each print run, although many of his political and religious works would have been printed in editions of 250, as their topics were often ephemeral.

Publications in the 1790s
Topic of imprint	Number
Religion	388
Literature	173
Medicine	156
Politics	118
Poetry	103
Science	61
Language	42
Fiction	32
Education	30
Philosophy	28
History	27
Economics	27
Biography	26
Humanitarian	23
Travel	23
Practical	23
Anthologies	14
Essays	14
Juvenilia	13
Women's issues	12
Drama	9

Publications by year
Year	Number
1790	177
1791	194
1792	164
1793	127
1794	119
1795	153
1796	114
1797	109
1798	95
1799	80

== Bibliography ==
- Aikin, John. "Biographical account of the late Mr. Joseph Johnson". The Gentleman's Magazine 79 (1809): 1167–68.
- Braithwaite, Helen. Romanticism, Publishing and Dissent: Joseph Johnson and the Cause of Liberty. New York: Palgrave Macmillan, 2003. ISBN 0-333-98394-7.
- Butler, Marilyn. "Culture's Medium: the Role of the Review". The Cambridge Companion to British Romanticism. Ed. Stuart Curran. Cambridge: Cambridge University Press, 1993. ISBN 0-521-33355-5.
- Chard, Leslie. "Bookseller to publisher: Joseph Johnson and the English book trade, 1760–1810". The Library. 5th series. 32 (1977): 138–154.
- Chard, Leslie. "Joseph Johnson: Father of the Book Trade". Bulletin of the New York Public Library 78 (1975): 51–82.
- Chard, Leslie. "Joseph Johnson in the 1790s". Wordsworth Circle 33.3 (2002): 95–101. doi:10.1086/TWC24044840
- Esterhammer, Angela. "Continental literature, translation, and the Johnson circle". Wordsworth Circle 33.3 (2002): 101–104. doi:10.1086/TWC24044841
- Gaull, Marilyn. "Joseph Johnson: Literary Alchemist". European Romantic Review 10.3 (1999): 265–278.
- Hall, Carol. "Joseph Johnson". Oxford Dictionary of National Biography. Oxford University Press. 2004. doi:10.1093/ref:odnb/14904 Retrieved on 30 April 2007.
- Hall, Carol. "Joseph Johnson (London 1761–1809)". The British Literary Book Trade, 1700–1820. Eds. J. K. Bracken and J. Silver. New York: Gale Group, 1995.
- Holmes, Richard. Footsteps: Adventures of a Romantic Biographer. New York: Viking, 1985. ISBN 0-670-32353-5.
- Lau, Beth. "William Godwin and the Joseph Johnson Circle: the evidence of the diaries". Wordsworth Circle 33.3 (2002): 104–109. doi:10.1086/TWC24044842
- Mandell, Laura. "Johnson's Lessons for men: producing the professional woman writer". Wordsworth Circle 33.3 (2002): 108–113. doi:10.1086/TWC24044843
- Mann, Phyllis. "Death of a London bookseller". Keats–Shelley Memorial Bulletin 15 (1964): 8–12.
- Oliver, Susan. "Silencing Joseph Johnson and the Analytical Review." The Wordsworth Circle. Vol. 40 (2-3), pp. 96-102. doi:10.1086/TWC24043451.
- Rowe, Mortimer. The History of Essex Hall. London: Lindsey Press, 1959. Full text reproduced here.
- Smyser, Jane Worthington. "The trial and imprisonment of Joseph Johnson, bookseller". Bulletin of the New York Public Library 77 (1974): 418–435.
- Tomalin, Claire. "Publisher in prison: Joseph Johnson and the book trade". Times Literary Supplement (2 December 1994): 15–16.
- Tyson, Gerald P. Joseph Johnson: A Liberal Publisher. Iowa City: University of Iowa Press, 1979. ISBN 0-87745-088-9.*
- Uglow, Jenny. "The Lunar Men: Five Friends Whose Curiosity Changed the World." Farrar, Straus and Giroux, New York, 2002.
- Zall, P. M. "The cool world of Samuel Taylor Coleridge: Joseph Johnson, or, The perils of publishing". Wordsworth Circle 3 (1972): 25–30. doi:10.1086/TWC24039296
