= Moses Haughton =

Moses Haughton was the name of an uncle and nephew who were both artists in late 18th and early 19th century England:

- Moses Haughton the Elder (sometimes spelled "Horton", c. 1734–1804), painter, designer, and engraver who spent most of his life in Birmingham
- Moses Haughton the Younger (1773–1849), engraver best known for his work with Henry Fuseli in London
