= Analytical Review =

English periodical from 1788 to 1798

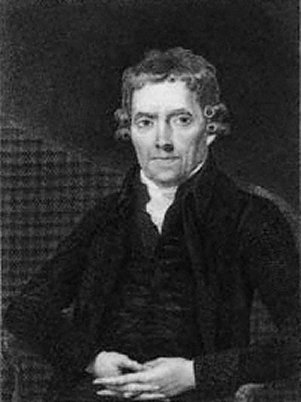
Joseph Johnson, co-founder of the Analytical Review (engraving by William Sharp after a painting by Moses Haughton)

The Analytical Review was an English periodical that was published from 1788 to 1798, having been established in London by the publisher Joseph Johnson and the writer Thomas Christie. Part of the Republic of Letters, it was a gadfly publication, which offered readers summaries and analyses of the many new publications issued at the end of the eighteenth century.

Perhaps most important, the Analytical Review provided a forum for radical political and religious ideas. Although it aimed at impartiality, its articles were often critical of the British government and supportive of the French revolutionaries. While the journal had low circulation numbers for its day, it still influenced popular opinion and was feared by the conservative government of William Pitt the Younger. In late 1797, the Anti-Jacobin, the self-styled nemesis of the Analytical Review, was founded by supporters of the government and other reactionary interests; it criticized the radical politics of the Analytical and monitored it for unpatriotic and irreligious sentiments.

Organized into separate departments, each with its own chief reviewer, the Analytical Review focused on politics, philosophy, natural history, and literature. To promote a disinterested air, its reviewers were anonymous, signing their work with pseudonymous initials. Nevertheless, the journal recruited several prominent writers, such as the poet William Cowper, the moralist William Enfield, the physician John Aikin and the polemicist Mary Wollstonecraft.

The Analytical Review suspended publication in December 1798 after the deaths of Christie (1796) and Wollstonecraft (1797), the conviction of Johnson for seditious libel (1798) and the retirement of other contributing editors.

== Establishment ==
=== Forerunners ===
The Whig Monthly Review, founded in 1749 by Ralph Griffiths, and the Tory Critical Review, founded in 1756 by Tobias Smollett, were the first journals dedicated to reviewing books in Britain. Although they were joined by smaller publications such as the Analytical Review, these two journals dominated reviewing in the second half of the eighteenth century. They focused on poetry, novels, drama, belles-lettres, travel literature, biographies, science writing and other forms of popular literature. They did not review many complex theological or scholarly works, particularly those in foreign languages.

Just prior to the founding of the Analytical Review, two periodicals with similar aims had collapsed. The first was the Theological Repository (1770–73; 1784–88), whose driving force was Dissenting theologian, clergyman, and scientist Joseph Priestley. Its articles were intended to be rigorously analytical and attempted to "settl[e] the [Biblical] text by a comparison of various readings; by accurate translation, division, and punctuation; by a concise, well-digested commentary; by notes philosophical and explanatory; and finally by adding doctrinal and moral conclusions". Sold by Joseph Johnson at a low price to encourage a wide readership, the Repository was open to all opinions, provided that they were expressed courteously: "In this Repository not only will room be given to the freest objections to natural or revealed religion, but they are sincerely requested; and nothing that is new will be rejected, if it be expressed in decent terms". Although the Theological Repository was a financial liability for Johnson by 1771, he continued to publish it until 1773 and helped Priestley renew its publication in 1784.

A second forerunner of the Analytical Review was Paul Henry Maty's periodical A New Review (published 1782–86), which was likewise devoted to reviewing books and offering a summary of their contents. Like its successor, the New Review paid special attention to foreign literature and took a leading role in introducing German literature to the British public.

=== Founding and ideals ===
The demises of the Theological Repository and the New Review left a publishing vacuum; the arrival in London of the author Thomas Christie, who was dedicated to starting a new periodical that would replace and perhaps even improve upon these precursors, was the primary impetus in the creation of the Analytical Review. Johnson and Christie were mutual friends of Priestley and others, and their combined interest in beginning such a journal resulted in the foundation of the Analytical Review.

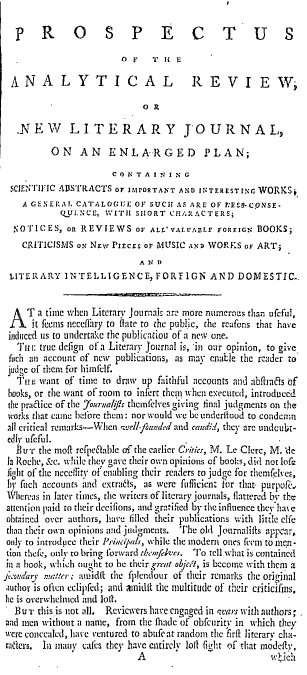
The prospectus for the Analytical Review (1788) outlined the journal's intention to present readers with objective summaries of important new publications.

Johnson and Christie's prospectus describes its reviewers as "the HISTORIANS of the Republic of Letters" [emphasis in original]. Literary scholar Paul Keen has described the Republic of Letters as a vision of society in which "all rational individuals could have their say, and in which an increasingly enlightened reading public would be able to judge the merit of different arguments for themselves". The practical goal of the Analytical Review was to facilitate this society by summarizing serious new and foreign publications in great depth so that intelligent readers might form their own opinions. This aim was embodied in its initial title: The Analytical Review; or, History of Literature, domestic and foreign, on an enlarged plan. Containing Scientific Abstracts of important and interesting Works, published in English; a general account of such as are of less consequence, with short characters; Notices, or Reviews of valuable foreign Books; Criticism on New pieces of Music and Works of Art; and the Literary Intelligence of Europe, etc. The periodical sought to avoid ephemeral works and to review only "standard works which add to the stock of human knowledge and will live beyond a day". Johnson and Christie also intended to eschew editorializing and to avoid shaping the tastes of the public. Scrupulous attention to this point was meant to bring the reviewed work into the foreground and not the reviewer (a goal shared by many eighteenth-century journals). An early review, for example, criticized historian Edward Gibbon for "so frequently and unnecessarily obtruding his particular prejudices on the eye of his readers". All editors signed their reviews with initials (sometimes not their own) rather than with their names. This practice was meant to prevent the appearance of collusion between the reviewers and the authors reviewed, although this did not succeed in practice. It was also intended to prevent any unethical puffing, or false advertising, of friends' or one's own books; nevertheless, both Henry Fuseli and Mary Wollstonecraft reviewed their own books for the journal.

In repackaging other publications for its readers, the Analytical Review participated in the encyclopedic movement of the eighteenth century, a movement largely begun by Denis Diderot and Jean le Rond d'Alembert's Encyclopédie. Excited and yet overwhelmed by what they viewed as a dramatic increase in human knowledge, encyclopedists of the era aimed to organize and classify all of this new knowledge using a new reference system: the encyclopedia. The Analytical Review was part of this project and its editors believed that they were preserving the knowledge of the past and the present for the future. The journal was, according to scholar Nathaniel Teich, "the most important radical review adopting the encyclopedic format for the attempted universal coverage of published works". Yet, the editors also recognized the ultimate futility of such a project.

The Analytical Review was meant to enlighten the public as well as to simplify communication between authors separated by great distances; most importantly, the debates between those authors could be read by the public. In granting authors a public forum in which to communicate, periodicals such as the Analytical helped to define authorship—they encouraged the professionalization of writing and granted prestige to writers and journalists.

Unusual for its time, the Analytical Review brought current foreign-language publications, particularly those with a scientific, philosophical, or aesthetic bent, to its readers' attention. For example, it approvingly reviewed Friedrich Schiller's Fiesco (published by Johnson) and argued that more of the author's works should be translated. The Analytical also emphasized the emerging middle-class Protestant work ethic, specifically tying it to scientific knowledge. One issue celebrated successful British merchants, calling them "the most liberal and enlightened men that have appeared in Europe" because of their "love of science" and their "patronage of learned men".

== Organization and reviewers ==
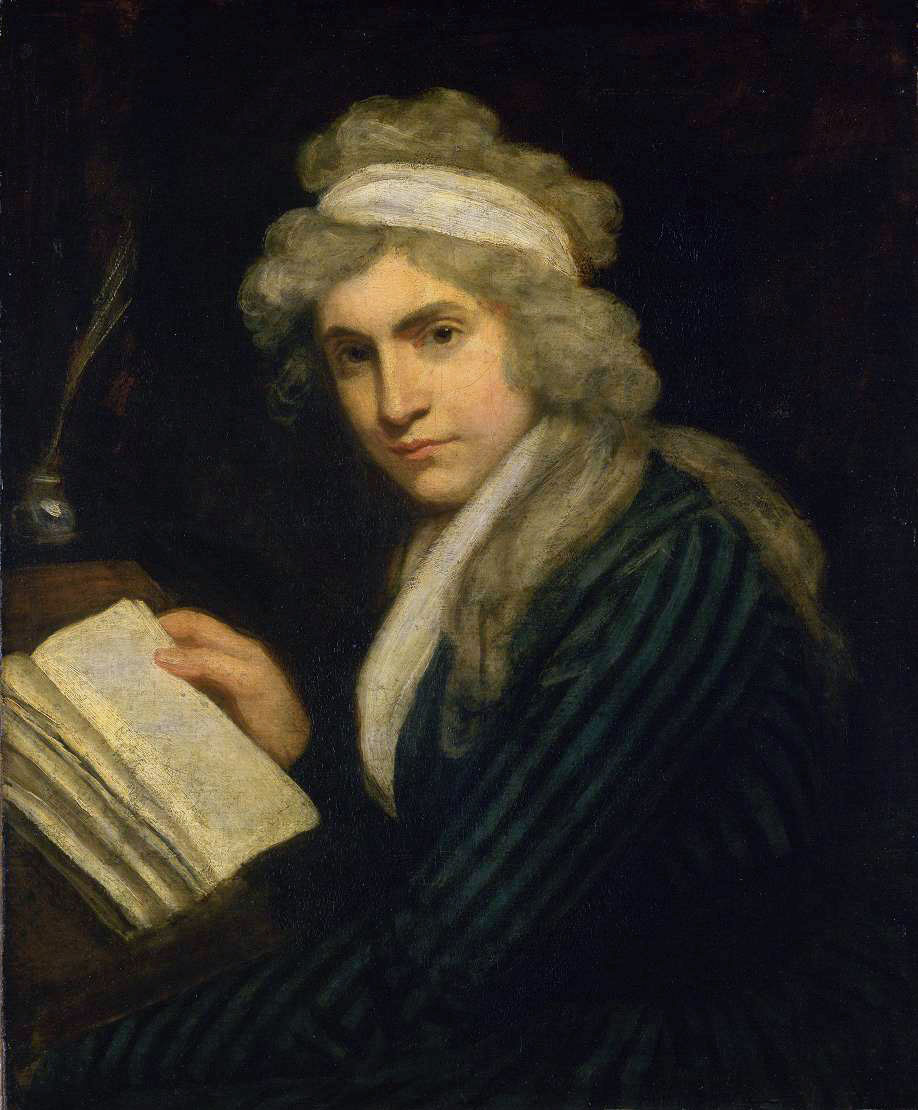
Mary Wollstonecraft, by John Opie (c. 1791). Wollstonecraft was a friend of Joseph Johnson and one of the Analytical Review's major editors.

Johnson and Christie set up separate departments for practical sciences, such as mathematics, natural history, agriculture, and medicine; literature, such as poetry, drama, and romance; and finally, politics and religion, which encompassed government, theology, philosophy, morality, law, and trade. For each department, there was a chief reviewer, although he or she might engage others. Although the reviewers' names were not known to the public, Johnson and Christie managed to acquire several luminaries: the poet William Cowper; the popular moralist William Enfield; the writer and physician John Aikin; the poet, essayist, and children's author Anna Laetitia Barbauld; the Unitarian minister William Turner; the physician and literary critic James Currie; the artist Henry Fuseli; the writer Mary Hays; the scholar Alexander Geddes; and the theologian Joshua Toulmin. The reviewers were all paid, however scholars have been unable to discover their rates. Christie was often absent after the founding of the Analytical Review, leaving the day-to-day operations of the journal up to Johnson. In 1790 he went to Paris for six months, during which he met with revolutionary leaders and started a business; in 1792 he returned to help the French translate their constitution and to dissolve his business. He left for Surinam in 1796 to collect money owed to him, and died there.

The first issue of the Analytical Review was dated May 1788 and the last issue was dated December 1798. The issues were published monthly and averaged 128 pages. They were also collected into volumes, which consisted of four monthly issues and an appendix (volumes 21–28 switched to a semi-annual publication run without appendices). Each issue contained an extensive table of contents, several major reviews of 10 to 20 pages (sometimes extending to a second issue), many minor reviews, and a "catalogue of books and pamphlets published" during the previous six months.

Compared with other major periodicals of its day, the Analytical Review had a low circulation. While both the Tory Critical Review and the British Critic had a circulation of 3,500 by 1797 and the Monthly Review realized 5,000, Johnson and Christie's journal only ever achieved about 1,500. However, it was common practice during the eighteenth century for an individual copy of each publication to be read by many different people. Scholars have estimated that each copy of a London newspaper, for example, was read by thirty people; coffeehouses and taverns were well-stocked with copies of newspapers and journals, as were circulating libraries. Hence, circulation numbers offer only a small glimpse into how many people actually read such publications.

Beginning with the Analytical Review's third issue, Mary Wollstonecraft became the key editor for dramas, romances, and novels. Scholars have speculated that her reviews are signed by the letters "M", "W", or "T", corresponding roughly to her initials, in large part because they have identified her writing style in these pieces. Her reviews, which number over 200, are generally characterized by their concern for women's issues. Wollstonecraft scholar Mitzi Myers concludes that Wollstonecraft "is not only a pioneer feminist, but also a pioneer feminist critic, whose analysis of the mesh between gender and genre inaugurates the feminist critical project". Wollstonecraft wrote excoriating reviews, criticizing the passive novelistic heroines of the time and praising, for example, the "wise and resilient" Mrs Stafford of Charlotte Smith's autobiographical novel Emmeline (1788). In highlighting this character, she "singles out ... the knowledgeable mother figure who has felt and thought deeply", one who resembles the women she described in A Vindication of the Rights of Woman (1792) as having "power ... over themselves". She derides the "derivative, prescriptive, imitative, and affected" and celebrates the "natural, innovative, [and] imaginative". Evincing a particular regard for the works of Thomas Holcroft, such as Anna St. Ives (1792), Wollstonecraft celebrated their championing of innate nobility and virtue over aristocratic titles. Romanticist Anne Chandler argues that Wollstonecraft's reviews demonstrate "an earlier Augustan politics of knowledge, variously outlined by Dryden, Pope, and, to a lesser extent, Swift" which "may be seen in her insistence on a continuum between aesthetic integrity and civic virtue; her belief in a metaphysical dialogue between human wit and divine Nature; and her perception of belletristic criticism as the proper tribunal for a new onslaught of scholarly and scientific research". While writing her last novel, Maria: or, The Wrongs of Woman (1798), Wollstonecraft took advantage of her position with Johnson and reviewed almost nothing but novels, exposing herself to the wide variety of novelistic forms.

The other reviewers have been the focus of far less scholarship. According to Eudo Mason, "Fuseli's peculiar style, his favourite phrases and quotations, themes and ideas make it possible to determine his authorship beyond reasonable doubt in most cases". He signed reviews "Z.Z." and "R.R." (of which there are about 40), initials which appear throughout the run of the journal. He also occasionally signed reviews "Y.Y.", "U.U.", "V.V.", and "L.L." (although this last was used by another reviewer as well). In total, Mason counts 66 reviews, 56 of which he is certain. Fuseli made it a practice to review texts which mentioned him, works written by friends he wanted to assist with flattering reviews, artistic works, and German literature (in particular those written by Johann Gottfried Herder).

Geddes, who contributed from the first issue, wrote forty-six articles, almost all on topics of biblical criticism or ecclesiastical history. However, he left the Analytical in September 1793 to edit for the Monthly Review. Cowper, who probably submitted articles under the initials P.P. and G.G., predominantly reviewed poetry.

== Content and political leanings ==
Prise de la Bastille (1789) by Jean-Pierre-Louis-Laurent Houël

The Analytical Review offered its readers access to a wide variety of works. In July 1789, when the Bastille fell, the Analytical reviewed The Rural Economy of Gloucestershire, Life of Thomas Chatterton, Transactions in Bengal, Military Operations on the Coromandel Coast, Poetry and Music of the Italian Opera, and Histoire Politique de la Revolution en France. The journal also laid provocative facts before the public to prompt them to think and, if necessary, to take action, although it claimed not to advocate one viewpoint over another. For example, when philosopher and statesman Edmund Burke issued his politically controversial Reflections on the Revolution in France (1790), the Analytical Review reviewed it extensively, as well as the many responses to it, such as Wollstonecraft's Vindication of the Rights of Men (1790), Vindiciae Gallicae (1791) by James Mackintosh, and Rights of Man (1791) by Thomas Paine. However, the majority of the excerpts that the reviewers chose to publish came from the rebuttals to Burke's work.

Consistent with Joseph Johnson's attitudes, the Analytical Review tended towards a "moderate radicalism", meaning that it opposed the Pitt administration and celebrated the general values of Paine's Rights of Man. It advocated a moderate reform of Parliament, emphasized the benefits of representative government, and outlined the protections afforded by a separation of powers. While the journal supported the ideals of the French Revolution and opposed Britain's war against France, it did not endorse the violent methods of some of the revolutionaries. Johnson continued his attempts to remain even-handed in political debates, arguing that factionalism in government was detrimental.

Helen Braithwaite, in her book on Johnson, argues that "by July 1798 ... the Analytical had become a deep thorn in the side of the government"; at Johnson's trial for seditious libel, an issue of the periodical was entered as evidence against him, demonstrating that the government did not view the journal as non-partisan. Derek Roper, in his survey of late-eighteenth-century periodicals, describes the Analytical as "more radical both in politics and in religion than any other journal". As he explains, however, "these sentiments were not always fully explicit, and might be conveyed through the tone and manner of a summary rather than paragraphs of criticism".

Many of the founding members of the Analytical Review were Unitarian and quite a few of its contributors were Dissenters, so contemporaries believed there to be a bias in the journal (most eighteenth-century journals were overtly partisan). Christie attempted to assuage these fears in his advertisement:

It has been insinuated that the Analytical review originated from a party [the Unitarians], and is meant to serve their purposes. We give ourselves little trouble about such reports. The public will soon judge from the execution of our work, whether we are sincere or not in our professions of impartiality, and to them we appeal.

This sincere attitude seems to have largely prevailed in practice. Theophilus Lindsey, who had helped establish Unitarianism in Britain, wrote to the Reverend Newcome Cappe to express his displeasure at a review in the first issue of the Analytical, demonstrating that Unitarian theology was not being promulgated by the journal. Furthermore, Johnson chose as his theological reviewer, not a Dissenter as his friend Joseph Priestley urged, but Alexander Geddes, a talented Scot who had been ordained in Paris as a Roman Catholic priest. However, modern scholars have suggested that he did so not for religious reasons, but because Geddes lived in London and had close connections both to Wollstonecraft and Johnson's friend, Henry Fuseli.

== Anti-Jacobin Review ==
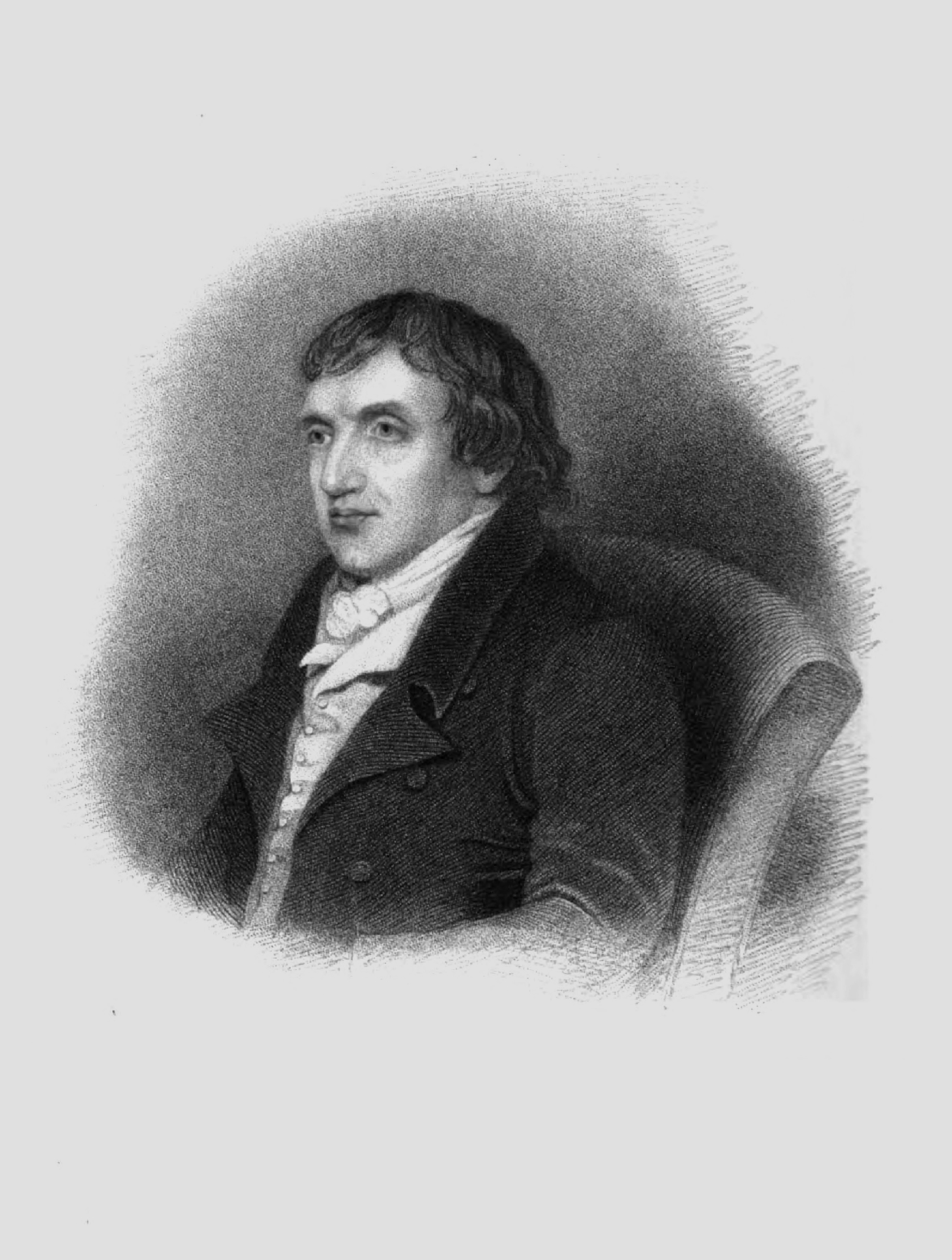
William Gifford, the founder of the Anti-Jacobin Review

The self-styled nemesis of the Analytical Review was The Anti-Jacobin; or, Weekly Examiner (later retitled The Anti-Jacobin Review and Magazine), a loyalist periodical begun in November 1797 by the writer William Gifford at the suggestion of the politician George Canning, and with the tacit encouragement of the administration of William Pitt. The chief editor and writer was John Richards Green (writing under the pseudonym "John Gifford") together with Andrew Bisset. In its prospectus, the Anti-Jacobin Review announced:

that the channels of criticism have long been corrupted; that many of the Reviews, sinking the critic in the partisan, have insidiously contributed to favour the designs of those writers who labour to undermine our civil and religious establishments, and, by a shameless dereliction of duty, to cast an odium on their opponents.

The editors therefore decided to "counteract the pernicious effects of this dangerous SYSTEM" [emphasis in original] and to "restore criticism to its original standard"—they would "frequently review the Monthly, criticise the Critical, and analyse the Analytical Reviews [sic]" [emphasis in original]. The Anti-Jacobin Review published a regular feature, "The Reviewers Reviewed", which analyzed the "Jacobin" reviews for politically unacceptable statements and images. The Anti-Jacobin Review also attacked the Analytical Review for its perceived atheism and for what they deemed its lack of patriotism.

During Johnson's 1798 trial for seditious libel for publishing a pamphlet by Gilbert Wakefield, they wrote:

Does he [Johnson] imagine that we do not know that the proprietor of the Analytical Review is himself under prosecution for selling this same pamphlet of Mr. Wakefield's? It is not the prosecution of Mr. Cuthell, then, but the prosecution of Mr. JOHNSON, that excites the indignation of these venal and contemptible critics, as well as that of the whole party [the Unitarians], who are bursting with spite, and thirsting for revenge. It is by his orders to men whom he pays for scribbling in his miserable Review, that every writer who exposes the defects, as they are delicately termed, of Mr. Wakefield's pamphlet, is abused in the most scurrilous and indiscriminate manner. We advise, therefore, these critics, in future, to throw off a mask which will no longer conceal their object, and boldly, if they dare, pronounce a eulogy on the loyalty of this favorite publisher and friend of the PRIESTLEYS, the DARWINS, the GODWINS, and other unprejudiced authors, who have kindly taken upon themselves, for the last twenty years, the important task of enlightening the public mind. [emphasis in original]

The Anti-Jacobin also published parodies of the works of liberal poets; most famously, "Loves of the Triangles" mocked Erasmus Darwin's Loves of the Plants (1791).

== Dissolution and brief resurrection ==
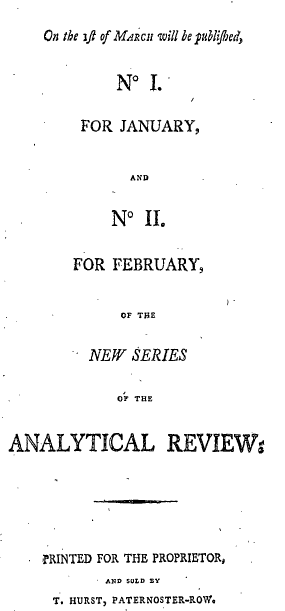
Title page and advertisement for the first and second issue of the Analytical Review (New Series)

After Johnson was convicted on 17 July 1798, and before he was sentenced on 12 February 1799, he tried to prove that he had "uniformly recommended the circulation of such publications as had a tendency to promote good morals instead of such as were calculated to mislead and inflame the Common people". Periodical scholar Stuart Andrews therefore argues that the last issues of the Analytical Review "must be read in the light of Johnson's impending sentence". The June 1798 issue focused on travel literature and female fashions, and although it reviewed Mary Hays's Appeal to the Men of Great Britain on Behalf of Women, it did not do so with any "political bite". In the same months that the Anti-Jacobin Review launched its first critiques of the Analytical and other journals, the Analytical published extensive articles on the picturesque and other aesthetic theories.

The editors of the Anti-Jacobin Review took credit for the "dissolution" of the Analytical Review in the preface to their bound 1798 volume, writing: "The other object of our immediate attacks, the Analytical Review, has received its death-blow, and we have more reason to congratulate ourselves upon the share which we have had in producing its dissolution, than it would be expedient here to unfold." They also published a cartoon by Thomas Rowlandson entitled "A Charm for a Democracy, Reviewed, Analysed, & Destroyed". However, scholars attribute the end of Johnson and Christie's journal to Johnson's trial for seditious libel and the ensuing negative publicity, in addition to the deaths of Christie and Wollstonecraft in 1796 and 1797 respectively.

After its suspension with the December 1798 issue, the Analytical Review lay dormant until it was briefly revived as The Analytical Review (New Series) during the first six months of 1799. It was printed and sold by T. Hurst of Paternoster Row, apparently without any connection to Johnson or the prior reviewers. Unlike its predecessor, the new series was cautious; it reviewed relatively uncontroversial works and its articles did not have initialled signatures. This series lasted only from January until June 1799.

Butler writes that "one marker of the end of the bourgeois republic of letters was the jailing in 1798 of the doyen of publisher-booksellers, Joseph Johnson". Moreover, she explains that the seeming ideological "coherence" of the Republic of Letters, as it was represented in late-eighteenth-century British journals, was eliminated with the founding of the Anglican British Critic in 1792 and the establishment of the Edinburgh Review in 1802. The Edinburgh, according to Butler, "plainly set out to break the mould of existing journal culture". Rather than attempting to cover a wide variety of texts, as had the Analytical Review and its cohorts, it focused on only a few texts and restricted itself to subject areas that the editors deemed worthwhile. For example, it emphasized academic fields for which Scottish universities were well-known, such as the natural sciences, moral philosophy, and political economy. Radical political writings, classical studies, clerical writings, and popular literature were either excluded or ridiculed.

== Bibliography ==
- Allentuck, Marcia. "Henry Fuseli and J. G. Herder's Ideen Zur Philosophie der Geschichte der Menschheit in Britain: An Remarked Connection". Journal of the History of Ideas 35.1 (1974): 113–120.
- Andrews, Stuart. The British Periodical Press and the French Revolution, 1789–99. New York: Palgrave, 2000. ISBN 0-333-73851-9.
- Braithwaite, Helen. Romanticism, Publishing and Dissent: Joseph Johnson and the Cause of Liberty. New York: Palgrave Macmillan, 2003. ISBN 0-333-98394-7.
- Butler, Marilyn. "Culture's Medium: the Role of the Review". The Cambridge Companion to British Romanticism. Ed. Stuart Curran. Cambridge: Cambridge University Press, 1993. ISBN 0-521-42193-4.
- Chandler, Anne. "The 'seeds of order and taste': Wollstonecraft, the Analytical Review, and critical idiom". European Romantic Review 16.1 (2005): 1–21. doi:10.1080/1050958042000338525
- Esterhammer, Angela. "Continental literature, translation, and the Johnson circle". Wordsworth Circle 33.3 (2002): 101–105.
- Mason, Eudo C., ed. The Mind of Henry Fuseli: Selections from his Writings with an Introductory Study. London: Routledge & Kegan Paul, 1951.
- Keen, Paul. The Crisis of Literature in the 1790s: Print Culture and the Public Sphere. Cambridge: Cambridge University Press, 1999. ISBN 0-521-65325-8.
- Myers, Mitzi. "Sensibility and the 'Walk of Reason': Mary Wollstonecraft's Literary Reviews as Cultural Critique". Sensibility in Transformation: Creative Resistance to Sentiment from the Augustans to the Romantics. Ed. Syndy McMillen Conger. Rutherford: Fairleigh Dickinson University Press, 1990. ISBN 0-8386-3352-8.
- Roper, Derek. Reviewing before the Edinburgh. London: Methuen and Co., 1978. ISBN 0-416-16780-2.
- Stewart, Sally. "Mary Wollstonecraft's Contributions to the Analytical Review". Essays in Literature 11.2 (1984): 187–199.
- Teich, Nathaniel. "The Analytical Review". British Literary Magazines: The Augustan Age and the Age of Johnson, 1698–1788. Ed. Alvin Sullivan. Westport, CT: Greenwood Press, 1983. ISBN 0-313-22871-X.
- Tyson, Gerald P. Joseph Johnson: A Liberal Publisher. Iowa City: University of Iowa Press, 1979. ISBN 0-87745-088-9.
