= Samuel Henshall =

English clergyman and writer

Samuel Henshall (1764 or 1765 – 17 November 1807) was an English clergyman and writer, and inventor of a type of corkscrew.

== Life ==
Henshall was born in 1764 or 1765, son of George Henshall, a grocer of Sandbach, Cheshire, and was educated at Manchester Grammar School. He went on to Brasenose College, Oxford, matriculating in October 1782, and subsequently became one of Hulme's exhibitioners. His tutor was Thomas Braithweite, an old Manchester schoolboy, whom he mentions gratefully in his "Etymological Organic Reasoner", p. 8. He graduated B.A. in June 1786, M.A. in May 1789, and after taking holy orders was elected a fellow of the college.

In December 1792, being then curate of Christ Church, Spitalfields, he was an unsuccessful candidate for the lectureship of St Peter the Poor, and preached a probationary sermon, afterwards published. In November 1800 he stood, again without success, for the Anglo-Saxon professorship at Oxford against Thomas Hardcastle (The Gentleman's Magazine, volume 70 part 2 p. 1097). In 1801 he was appointed a public examiner in the university.

He was presented by his college in January 1802 to the rectory of St Mary Stratford, Bow, Middlesex. He died there on 17 November 1807, aged 42, and was buried in the chancel.

== Publications ==
Henshall published:

1. Specimens and Parts; containing a History of the County of Kent and a Dissertation on the Laws from the reign of Edward the Confessour to Edward the First; of a Topographical, Commercial, Civil, and Nautical History of South Britain …, from authentic documents. 2 volumes, 1798. This was to have been completed in six quarterly parts, but it was discontinued after forty-one pages of volume 2 had been printed.
2. The Saxon and English Languages reciprocally illustrative of each other; the Impracticability of acquiring an accurate Knowledge of Saxon Literature through the Medium of the Latin Phraseology exemplified in the Errors of Hickes, Wilkins, Gibson, and other scholars; and a new Mode suggested of radically studying the Saxon and English Languages, 1798, dedicated to Thomas Astle, his "avowed patron", who had permitted him the "unlimited perusal" of his manuscripts. Richard Gough and Professor Charles Mayo in The Gentleman's Magazine (volume 68, part 2, pp. 861–5) and Horne Tooke in the Analytical Review exposed what they considered to be Henshall's ignorance and self-conceit.
3. Domesday, or an Actual Survey of South Britain, … faithfully translated, with an introduction, notes, and illustrations, by Samuel Henshall … and John Wilkinson, M.D., 1799. This, comprehending the counties of Kent, Sussex, and Surrey, was to be the first of ten similar numbers, which were to contain both volumes of the original. In spite of a boastful advertisement, the book was shown to be full of blunders, and dropped after the first number.
4. Strictures on the late Motions of the Duke of Leinster, … R. B. Sheridan, Esq., … and a paragraph in the semi-official Chronicle of Opposition, 1799 (Gentleman's Magazine volume 70, part 2, p. 645).
5. "A thanksgiving sermon upon Trafalgar", preached on 5 December 1805, described as "fustian declamation" in The Gentleman's Magazine for April 1806.
6. The Gothic Gospel of Saint Matthew, from the Codex Argenteus of the Fourth Century; with the corresponding English or Saxon from the Durham Book of the Eighth Century, in Roman characters; a literal English Lesson of each; and Notes, Illustrations, and Etymological Disquisitions on Organic Principles, 1807, dedicated to Richard Heber, to whom Henshall was indebted for the loan of rare books. Four monthly numbers; the fifth, due on 30 September 1807, was stopped by Henshall's last illness. In the "occasional preface" he turns upon his critics and threatens in a note to expose "this mystery of iniquity", in which "many Antiquaries, Blackstonians, Electioneering Oxonians, Reviewers, Low Churchmen, Presbyterians, Methodists, and other herds of animals that follow their leader's tail are concerned".

Henshall was for a time a frequent contributor to the Anti-Jacobin Review.

== Corkscrew patent ==
Henshall was awarded on 24 August 1795 the first patent for a corkscrew. It had a fixed disc or button between the worm and the shank, so that the worm would not advance further when the button reached the top of the bottle. It is known as the Henshall Button Corkscrew, and was manufactured by Matthew Boulton. On 24 August 2009, a commemorative plaque for Henshall's burial place, mentioning his invention, was presented to the Reverend Michael Peet at Bow Church.
