= William Christie (Unitarian) =

Scottish Unitarian writer

William Christie (1748–1823) was a Scottish Unitarian writer, one of the earliest apostles of Unitarianism in Scotland and America.

== Life ==
Christie was a son of Thomas Christie, merchant and provost of Montrose, and uncle of Thomas Christie the political writer. He was born at Montrose, and educated at the grammar school there under his kinsman, Hugh Christie. He spent a few years in commerce at Montrose. Brought up a Presbyterian faith, he studied and adopted Unitarian doctrines, at a high social cost. Writing to Joseph Priestley in 1781 he stated that, so great was his unpopularity, that he did not suppose any Scottish minister would baptise his children. By Priestley's mediation, Caleb Rotheram of Kendal visited Montrose to perform the rite.

About 1782 he, with a few friends of similar opinions, founded a Unitarian church at Montrose, of which he became the minister. This was the first Unitarian congregation established in Scotland. From December 1783 to May 1785 he had as his colleague Thomas Fyshe Palmer. He retired from business, and went to live in seclusion at Woodston, about six miles from Montrose. In 1794 he accepted the invitation of the Unitarian congregation at Glasgow to become their minister. He there delivered sermons which he later published under the title of ‘Dissertations on the Unity of God,’ and issued proposals for the publication of a series of lectures on the Revelation of St. John, but the project met with no encouragement. He remained at Glasgow just over a year. Unitarianism and Unitarians were extremely unpopular in Scotland, and in August 1795 he followed his friend and correspondent Priestley to America. There he met with troubles caused to some extent by his combative views.

After periods at Winchester, Virginia and Northumberland, Pennsylvania, where he delivered an address at Dr. Priestley's funeral on 9 February 1804, he settled in Philadelphia, where for some time he was the minister of a small Unitarian congregation. The last years of his life were passed in retirement, and were devoted to theological study.

He died at Long Branch, New Jersey, on 21 November 1823. Of his eight children three only survived him.

== Works ==
In 1784 he published the most popular of his works, Discourses on the Divine Unity. His other main works are:

- ‘An Essay on Ecclesiastical Establishments in Religion, showing their Hurtful Tendency. … By a Protestant Dissenter,’ Montrose, 1791.
- ‘A Farewell Discourse to the Society of Unitarian Christians at Montrose,’ Montrose, 1794.
- ‘A Serious Address to the Inhabitants of Winchester on the Unity of God and Humanity of Christ,’ Winchester, Virginia, 1800.
- ‘A Speech delivered at the Grave of the Rev. Joseph Priestley,’ Northumberland, Pennsylvania, 1804.
- ‘Dissertations on the Unity of God,’ Philadelphia, 1810.
- ‘A Review of Dr. Priestley's Theological Works, appended to the Memoirs of Dr. P.,’ London, 1806–7.

Christie was also a contributor to the Christian Reformer, Monthly Repository and the ‘Winchester (Va.) Gazette,’ ‘Northumberland (Pa.) Gazette,’ and ‘Democratic Press’ (Philadelphia).

== Notes ==
Attribution

This article incorporates text from a publication now in the public domain: "Christie, William (1748-1823)". Dictionary of National Biography. London: Smith, Elder & Co. 1885–1900.
