= John Gifford (writer) =

British historian

John Gifford (1758 – 6 March 1818) was an English political writer. He was born John Richards Green until changing his name at the age of 23.

Gifford wrote a History of England (two volumes, 1790), History of France (four volumes, 1791-3), and The Reign of Louis XVI: a Complete History of the French Revolution (1794). A staunch supporter of William Pitt the Younger's government, Gifford wrote loyalist pamphlets such as A Plain Address to the Common Sense of the People of England with an annex titled ‘An abstract of Thomas Paine's life and writings’ (1792). His 1798 Short Address to Members of Loyal Associations was said to have sold 100,000 copies. Gifford also translated a few French émigré royalist pamphlets. He founded the Anti-Jacobin Review in 1798 after the demise of The Anti-Jacobin. It published until 1821. His Short Address included a scenario of Jacobin Britain: Thomas Paine, John Horne Tooke, John Thelwall, Thomas Hardy and Thomas Muir would be members of Directories for England, Scotland and Ireland, with policies such as disbanding the Royal Navy to be given away to France, Holland and Spain with England, Scotland and Ireland having token ships.

Gifford died in Bromley, Kent, aged about 60.
