= Anti-Jacobin Review =

British conservative political journal

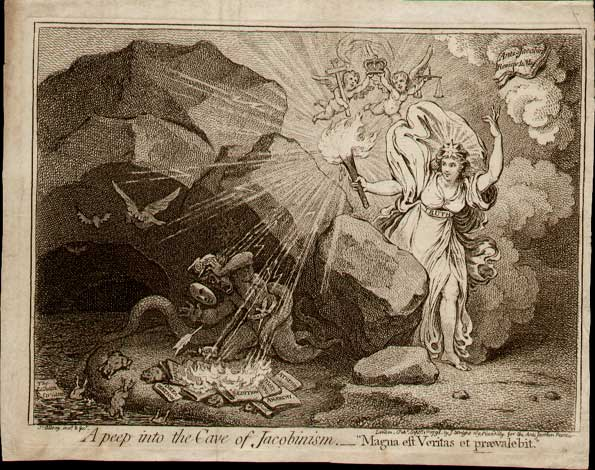
James Gillray, "A Peep Into the Cave of Jacobinism" (1798). Published in the Anti-Jacobin Review.

The Anti-Jacobin Review and Magazine, or, Monthly Political and Literary Censor, was a British conservative political journal active from 1798 to 1821. Founded by John Gifford after the cancellation of William Gifford's periodical Anti-Jacobin, the journal contained essays, reviews, and satirical engravings. Its content has been described as "often scurrilous" and "ultra-Tory" and was a prominent element of British hostility to Jacobinism and the broader ideals of the French Revolution.

== History ==
The first edition was published on 1 August 1798 and was advertised in The Times as "containing Original Criticism; a Review of the Reviewers; Miscellaneous Matter in Prose and Verse, Lists of Marriages, Births, Deaths and Promotions; and a Summary of Foreign and Domestic Politics." Gifford served as its editor until 1806. The periodical was covertly funded by the British government.

Contributors included Robert Bisset (1758/9–1805), John Bowles (1751–1819), Arthur Cayley (1776–1848), James Gillray, George Gleig, Samuel Henshall (1764/5–1807), James Hurdis, James Mill, John Oxlee (1779–1854), Richard Penn (1733/4–1811), Richard Polwhele, John Skinner (1744–1816), William Stevens (1732–1807), and John Whitaker (1735–1808), though as items were frequently published anonymously attributions are often unclear.

== Positions ==
Gifford called the periodical a champion of "religion, morality, and social order, as supported by the existing establishments, ecclesiastical and civil, of this country.

The periodical promoted conspiracy theories of attempts to establish Jacobinism in Britain, accusing the Monthly Review, the Analytical Review and The Critical Review of spreading Jacobinism through "secret channels, disguised in various ways." It supported the passage of the Unlawful Societies Act 1799 and the Combination Act 1799, arguing that the state needed the "wisdom to repress" in order to effectively defeat "domestic traitors."

It also opposed the Irish Rebellion of 1798.

== Reception ==
The periodical denounced reformers, especially the Evangelicals, and greatly angered them, as prominent politician and campaigner William Wilberforce made clear in 1800:

It is a most mischievous publication, which, by dint of assuming a tone of the highest loyalty and attachment to our establishment in church and state, secures a prejudice in its favour, and has declared war against what I think the most respectable and most useful of all orders of men—the serious clergy of the Church of England. . . . Its opposition to the evangelical clergy is carried on in so venomous a way, and with so much impudence, and so little regard to truth, that the mischief it does is very great indeed. It accuses them in the plainest terms, and sometimes by name, as being disaffected both to church and state.
