= Thomas Christie =

Scottish radical political writer (1761–1796)

- Born: 1761; Montrose, Scotland
- Died: 1796 (aged 34–35); London, England
- Occupation: Political writer

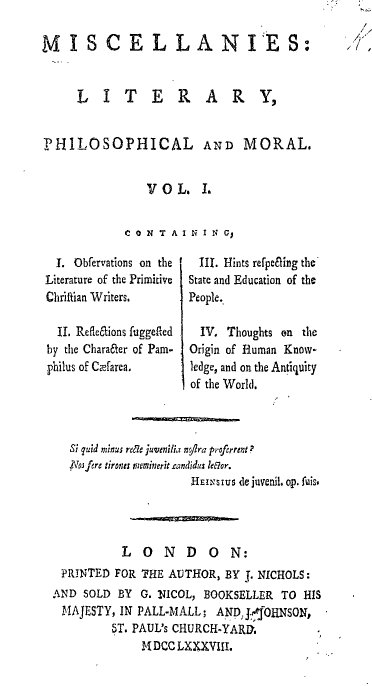
Title page from the first edition of Miscellanies

Thomas Christie (1761–1796) was a Scottish radical political writer during the late 18th century. He was one of the two original founders of the important liberal journal, the Analytical Review.

== Life ==
Christie was born to Alexander Christie (brother of the Unitarian writer William Christie), a merchant in Montrose, Scotland in 1761. Christie attended a local grammar school and subsequently became a clerk in a bank. Deciding that he was more interested in literature and science, Christie studied medicine independently and then matriculated at the Westminster General Dispensary in London in 1784. At the same time, he began writing a series of articles on natural history for the Gentleman's Magazine and became friends with its editor, John Nichols. Although he attended the University of Edinburgh in 1785 and 1786 to earn his medical degree, he left the program to dedicate himself to a life of letters.

In 1787 Christie took a six-month tour of Britain, visiting almost every important town. He met and began a correspondence with Anna Seward, a poet living in Lichfield; he also made the acquaintance of the naturalist and poet Erasmus Darwin, the naturalist and antiquary Thomas Pennant and the Dissenting minister and scientist Joseph Priestley.

In 1788 Christie and Joseph Johnson founded the highly influential Analytical Review, a periodical dedicated to open inquiry. It became the mouthpiece for reformers during the 1790s. A year later, he published the first part of Miscellanies, Philosophical, Medical, and Moral, the work for he which is best known. It discusses topics ranging from theology to public education to history.

During 1790 Christie spent six months in Paris, meeting many important French revolutionaries such as Mirabeau, Sieyès and Necker. Upon his return to Britain, he became a loyal supporter of the revolution and published A Sketch of the New Constitution of France. In 1791, he was one of the many who participated in the Revolution Controversy begun by Edmund Burke's Reflections on the Revolution in France (1790). His reply, Letters on the Revolution in France and the New Constitution, described his impressions of Paris and provided a contrast to Burke's depiction of it as lawless and violent. In 1792 he returned to Paris and was asked by the National Assembly to help translate a polyglot edition of the constitution.

On 9 September 1792 Christie married a Miss Thomson and entered into a partnership with her grandfather's successful London carpet manufacturing business. In 1796 he traveled to Suriname on business and died there.
