= Anti-Jacobin =

British weekly newspaper (1797-1798)

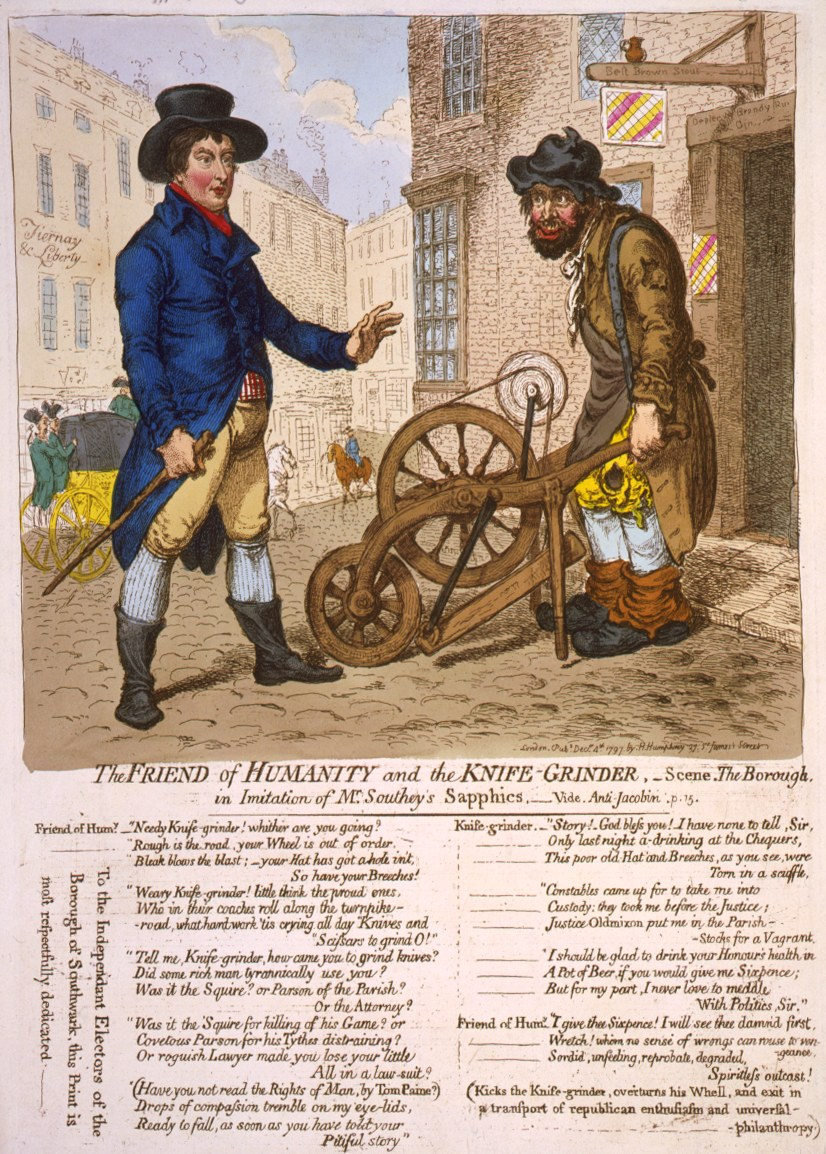
James Gillray's caricature The Friend of Humanity and the Knife-Grinder (1797) publicized the Anti-Jacobin.

The Anti-Jacobin, or, Weekly Examiner was an English newspaper founded by George Canning in 1797 and devoted to opposing the radicalism of the French Revolution. It lasted only a year, but was considered highly influential, and is not to be confused with the Anti-Jacobin Review, a publication which sprang up on its demise. The Revolution polarized British political opinion in the 1790s, with conservatives outraged at the killing of King Louis XVI, the expulsion of the nobles, and the Reign of Terror. Great Britain went to war against Revolutionary France. Conservatives castigated every radical opinion in Great Britain as "Jacobin" (in reference to the leaders of the Terror), warning that radicalism threatened an upheaval of British society. The Anti-Jacobin sentiment was expressed in print. William Gifford was its editor. Its first issue was published on 20 November 1797 and during the parliamentary session of 1797–98 it was issued every Monday.

The Anti-Jacobin was planned by Canning when he was Under-Secretary of State for Foreign Affairs. He secured the collaboration of George Ellis, John Hookham Frere, William Gifford, and some others. William Gifford was appointed working editor.

Canning founded it, in his words, "...to be full of sound reasoning, good principles, and good jokes and to set the mind of the people right upon every subject." One of Canning's biographers described its purpose as to "...deride and refute the ideas of the Jacobins, present the government's point of view on the issues of the day and expose the misinformation and misinterpretation which filled the opposition newspapers." In its first issue Canning said he and his friends:

...avow ourselves to be partial to the COUNTRY in which we live, notwithstanding the daily panegyrics which we read and hear on the superior virtues and endowments of its rival and hostile neighbours. We are prejudiced in favour of her Establishments, civil and religious; though without claiming for either that ideal perfection, which modern philosophy professes to discover in the more luminous systems which are arising on all sides of us.

Canning set out his "most serious, vehement and effective onslaught in verse" on the values of the French Revolution in a long poem, New Morality, published in the last issue of the Anti-Jacobin (No. 36, 9 July 1798). Canning considered these values as "French philanthropy" that professed a love of all mankind whilst eradicating every patriotic impulse. He described anyone in Great Britain who held these values as a "pedant prig" who "...disowns a Briton's part, And plucks the name of England from his heart...":

No – through th'extended globe his feelings run
As broad and general as th'unbounded sun!
No narrow bigot he; – his reason'd view
Thy interests, England, ranks with thine, Peru!
France at our doors, he sees no danger nigh,
But heaves for Turkey's woes the impartial sigh;
A steady patriot of the world alone,
The friend of every country – but his own.

To publicise the Anti-Jacobin, Canning paid the cartoonist James Gillray to publish plates themed on the Anti-Jacobin's principles, and some believe that twenty Gillray plates were the fruit of this arrangement.

William Pitt the Younger, the Prime Minister, also contributed to the newspaper.

The Anti-Jacobin estimated that its total readership was 50,000. They multiplied the regular weekly sale of 2,500 by seven (arriving at 17,500) because that was the average size of a family—and added 32,500 based on the assumption that many readers lent their copies to their poorer neighbours.

== History of composition ==
The Anti-Jacobin consisted of 36 issues printed from 20 November 1797 until 9 July 1798. These 36 issues amounted to only 288 pages; however, the Anti-Jacobin is considered one of the most influential and effective periodicals published for both literature and politics. There are two significant stylistic features of the Anti-Jacobin that contributes to these positive remarks: the mass amount of factual material and the straightforward, brief nature that the material was presented in.

The Anti-Jacobin is believed to have originated from George Canning's involvement in peace negotiations with France in 1797 when he was the undersecretary of state for foreign affairs. The coup d'état caused these negotiations to end abruptly on 4 September 1797. This led Canning to revert his attention towards his home, England, where he decided to write a letter to George Ellis on 19 October 1797. This letter contained Canning's proposal to write a periodical that was to include humour, good principles, and frank reasoning that would influence the public to side with the anti-Jacobins. With the help of fellow Tory Parliament members John Hookham Frere (Canning's school friend) and George Ellis, Canning was able to commission the publication of the Anti-Jacobin to Wright. The anti-Jacobins established their headquarters in a vacated, secret house nearby Wright where they would congregate every Sunday before each new issue was released.

William Gifford, the editor of the periodical, had established his style by writing poems like the Baviad (1794) and Maeviad (1795), which satirized Robert Merry, a Jacobin writer, and the Della Cruscans. Pitt, Jenkinson, Hammond, Baron Macdonald, and Marquis Wellesley were also contributors to the periodical.

The Anti-Jacobin satirized many famous poets, scientists, philosophers, politicians, explorers, pedagogues, and demagogues. "It was to its satire that it owed both its influence and its fame, and of this satire much was in verse, some of the most telling poems being from Canning’s pen", (Marshall 179). These groups and individuals included: the French and their British allies, radicals, William Wordsworth, Samuel Taylor Coleridge, Robert Southey, Erasmus Darwin, Thomas Paine, William Godwin, and Mary Wollstonecraft. Styles of poetry that were commonly mocked in the Anti-Jacobin were Orientalism, Gothic, Darwinian didactic couplets, German drama, and sentimentalism.

== The Poetry of the Anti-Jacobin ==
In 1799, William Gifford compiled the most memorable and innovative parts from the Anti-Jacobin: the poems. The Poetry of the Anti-Jacobin resembles another great work written at the time: Samuel Taylor Coleridge's Poems of Political Recantation. Though a great many poems in the Poetry of the Anti-Jacobin are humorous, some patriotic poems are written in dull Latin and are therefore more serious and tedious. “The political targets of the Poetry of the Anti-Jacobin are manifold: the villainy of the French, the treachery of the Irish, the hypocrisy of the Whigs, the philanthropic cant of the radical”.

== Individuals satirized ==
Many poets and intellectuals were attacked by the Anti-Jacobin because of their pro-French position.

Also, the Anti-Jacobin satirized individuals who were considered to have disturbed the Popean didactic poem. The following works were satirized by the Anti Jacobin: The Botanic Garden (1792) written by Erasmus Darwin, The Progress of Civil Society, a Didactic Poem in Six Books (1796) by Richard Payne Knight.

The Anti-Jacobin depicts William Godwin, philosopher and novelist (though not a poet), as “Mr. Higgins of St. Mary Axe", and “Mr. Higgins, poet and dramatist, supposedly writes some of the major parodies of the Poetry of the Anti-Jacobin: (The Progress of Man, The Loves of the Triangles, The Rovers). This figure is used to represent an individual who utilizes literature (didactic poetry) to enhance the Jacobin's cause.

According to David A. Kent and D. R. Ewin's book, Romantic Parodies' 1797-1831, “The Anti-Jacobin is now remembered for its parodies of Robert Southey more than for its journalism, patriotic verse, or Latin imitations”. Southey was the victim to four parodies written in the Anti-Jacobin because of his usage of experimental meters in poetry and sympathies in politics towards the republicans. Three poems that were made into parodies by the Anti-Jacobin were, Southey's “Inscription”, “The Widow”, and “The Soldier’s Wife”. Canning wrote “For the Door of the Cell in Newgate, where Mrs. Brownrigg, the Prentice-cide, was confined previous to her Execution”—a response to Southey's lines from “For the Apartment in Chepstow Castle where Henry Marten the Regicide was imprisoned for thirty years”. This piece had been considered an idealistic, republican, and well-written Jacobin piece. Canning replaces the main character, Marten, with the character Elizabeth Brownrigg, who was popularized by the work The Newgate Calendar. In this piece of literature, Brownrigg is depicted as a villain who awaits screams, curses, and demands for a strong drink before her execution.

For instance, Southey wrote:

For thirty years secluded from mankind
Here Marten linger’d. Often have these walls
Echoed his footsteps, as with even tread
He pac’d around his prison: not to him
Did Nature’s fair varieties exist;
He never saw the sun’s delightful beams;
Save when through you high bars he pour’d a sad
And broken splendour. Dost thou ask his crime?
He had rebelled against a King, and sat
In judgment on him: for his ardent mind
Shap’d goodliest plans of happiness on earth,
And peace and liberty. Wild dreams! but such
As Plato lov’d; such as with holy zeal
Our Milton worshipp’d. Blessed hopes! A while
From man with-held, e'en to the latter days
When Christ shall come, and all things be fulfilled.

Canning wrote:

For one long Term, or e’er her trial came,
Here BROWNRIGG linger’d. Often have these cells
Echoed her blasphemies, as with shirll voice
She screamed for fresh Geneva. No to her
Did the blithe fields of Tothill, or thy street,
St. Giles, its fair varieties expand;
Till at the last in slow-drawn cart she went
To execution. Dost thou ask her crime?
SHE WHIPP’D TWO FEMALE ‘PRENTICES TO DEATH,
AND HID THEM IN THE COAL-HOLE. For her mind
Shap’d strictest plans of discipline. Sage schemes!
Such as LYCURGUS taught, when at the shrine
Of the Orthyan Goddess he bade flog
The little Spartans; such as erst chastised
Our MILTON, when at College. For this act
Did BROWNRIGG swing. Harsh Laws! But time shall
Come
When France shall reign, and Laws be all repealed!

Through parodies such as “For the Door of the Cell in Newgate, where Mrs. Brownrigg, the Prentice-cide, was confined previous to her Execution,” Canning and other contributors felt that they were exposing the French revolutionaries' principles and motifs.

Another Southey work was satirized by Canning, Frere, Gifford and Ellis in "Poetry of the New Morality". This piece, in the style of Pope's "Dunciad", appeared in the last issue of the Anti-Jacobin. “Like that of Byron after them, the parody and satire of the contributors to the Anti-Jacobin is the voice of a vibrant neo-classicism, engaging in debate with the new spirit of age”.

Although the Anti-Jacobin satirized many poetic works well-known at the time, some of them benefited from the attention. According to Dorothy Marshall, Erasmus Darwin's “Love of the Vegetables” and Payne Knight's “Progress of Civil Society” would probably have been lost to history if the Anti-Jacobin's witty satire had not been written. Similarly, Erasmus Darwin's “The Botanic Garden” is principally remembered because of the satire “The Love of the Triangles”.

== Precursor and later publications ==
The Anti-Leveller of 1793 is considered an “elder relative” to the Anti-Jacobin. Alexander Watson's The Anti-Jacobin, a Hudibrastic Poem in Twenty-one Cantos (1794) had a similar motif and also contained stanzas filled with heavy sarcasm and rhymed couplets. Historians consider both of these works less interesting than the Anti-Jacobin.

Since the Anti-Jacobin was a wide success, it was reprinted in its entirety several times during 1799. Two of these were in quarto and also an octavo fourth edition that was edited. The Beauties of the Anti-Jacobin was also published that year, and was similar to the Poetry of the Anti-Jacobin.

The Anti-Jacobin’s final publication was immediately followed by the publication of the Anti-Jacobin Review, a Monthly Political and Literary Censor, which was considered a weaker, clumsier periodical compared to its parent. It was started by John Gifford and ran until 1821.
