= Moses Haughton the Younger =

English painter

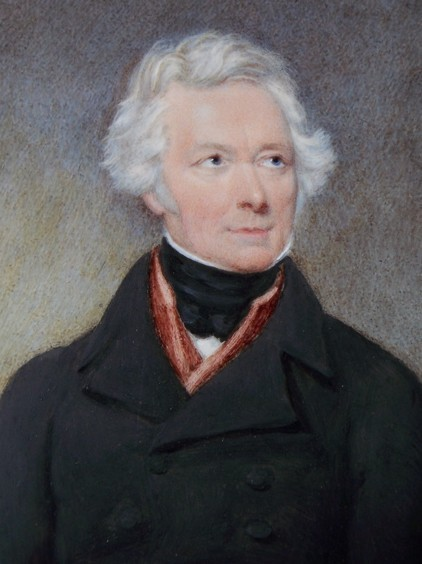
Henri Jean-Baptiste Victoire Fradelle by Moses Haughton the younger, 1848

Moses Haughton (7 July 1773 – 26 June 1849) was a British engraver and painter, often of miniatures.

== Life ==
Born in Wednesbury in the Black Country, the nephew of the painter Moses Haughton the elder, he moved to Liverpool in 1790. There he became a friend of William Roscoe and possibly studied under George Stubbs before enrolling at the Royal Academy Schools in London in 1795. In 1796 William Roscoe mentions Haughton as a 'young engraver' of note.

From 1803, Haughton was the resident engraver to Henry Fuseli, and it was largely through Haughton's prints that Fuseli's work became widely known; He painted a well known Miniature of Fuseli and his wife Sophia Rawlins. He became a close friend of Henry Fuseli, and resided with the Fuseli's in the Keeper's Apartments at Somerset House (RA). After Fuseli's death, Mrs. Fuseli lived with the Haughton family.

Haughton exhibited at the Royal Academy from 1808 to 1848. Two miniatures, "The Love Dream", and "The Captive" were engraved by R. W. Sievier; other painted portraits were also engraved.
