= Moses Haughton the Elder =

English painter

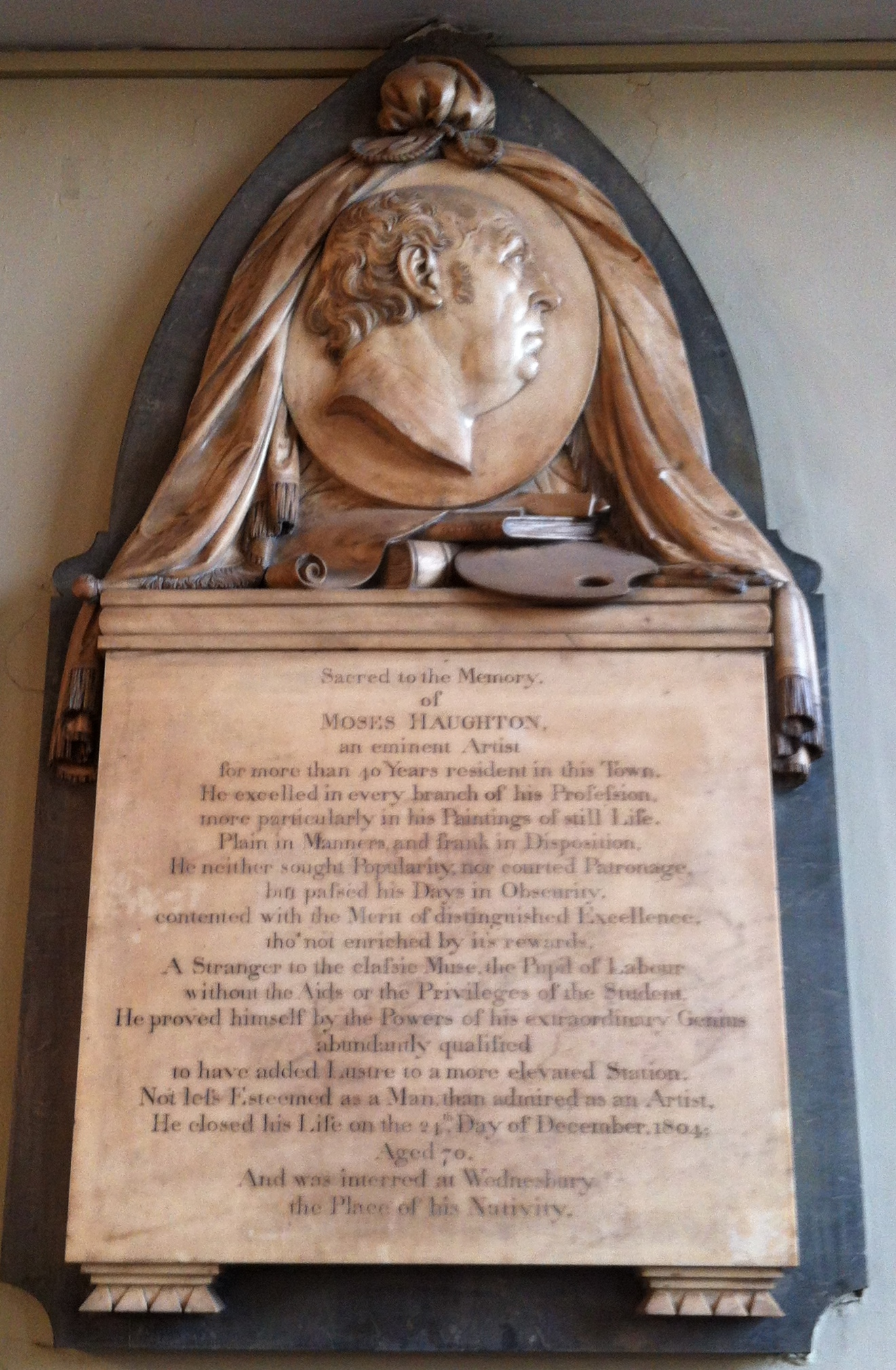
Memorial to Moses Haughton in St Philip's Cathedral, Birmingham

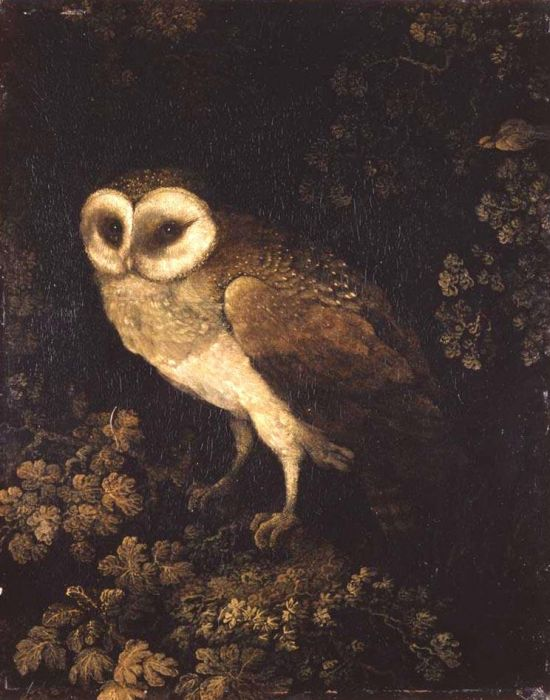
An Owl (c. 1780–1790), oil on panel

Moses Haughton, sometimes spelt Horton (c. 1734 – 24 December 1804) was a British designer, engraver and painter of portraits and still lifes.

== Life and work ==
Haughton was born in Wednesbury, Staffordshire, and baptised on 27 March 1735. He trained as an enamel painter and was employed at the workshop of Hyla Holden in Wednesbury, before moving to Birmingham to work for John Baskerville and Henry Clay in 1761, where he worked on enamelled, japanned and papier-mâché products. He was married to Elizabeth Haughton (1741 – 13 January 1816).

In 1809, together with Samuel Lines, he established a Life Academy in Peck Lane, a street leading out of New Street, close to what was the Free Grammar School (on a site now occupied by New Street station). This life school was so successful that in 1814 it was moved to a larger space in Union Passage. In this year it held its first public exhibition. In 1821 the (Royal) Birmingham Society of Artists grew from this venture.

Haughton was noted for his portraits, such as that of Lady Louisa Tollemache, Countess of Dysart, and still-life paintings of dead game, exhibiting at the Royal Academy between 1788 and 1804. He also illustrated a notable edition of the Bible in the late eighteenth century.

Haughton was said to be of a "quiet and retiring disposition" and was not much known outside Birmingham during his lifetime. He lived for many years at Ashted, then outside the town of Birmingham. He died there on 24 December 1804 and was buried in Wednesbury; a marble monument with his portrait, sculpted by Peter Rouw was erected in his memory at St Philip's Church, Birmingham.

His son, Matthew Haughton, was an artist and engraver, and his nephew, Moses Haughton the Younger (1773–1849), a painter and engraver.
