= William Gifford =

English writer and critic (1756–1826)

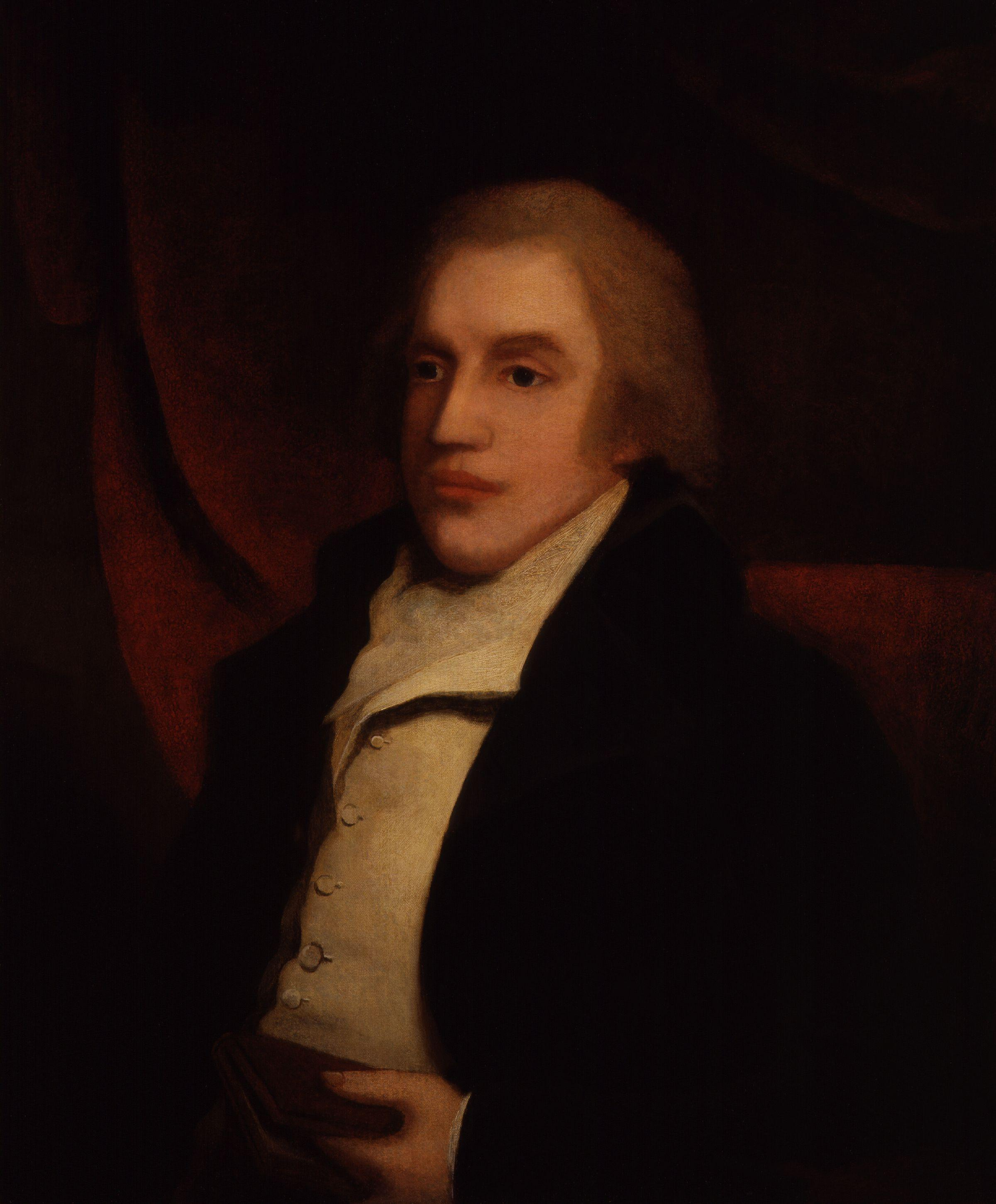
- Portrait of William Gifford, c. 1800
- Born: 14 April 1756; Ashburton, Devon, England
- Died: 31 December 1826 (aged 70); London, England
- Occupations: Writer; critic

William Gifford (14 April 1756 – 31 December 1826) was an English writer and literary critic. He was a prominent figure in the 18th century as a satirist and controversialist.

== Life ==
Gifford was born in Ashburton, Devon, to Edward Gifford and Elizabeth Cain. His father, a glazier and house painter, had run away as a youth with vagabond Bampfylde Moore Carew, and he remained a carouser throughout his life. He died when William was thirteen; his mother died less than a year later. He was left in the care of a godfather who treated him with little consistency. Gifford was sent in turn to work as a plough boy, a ship's boy, student, and cobbler's apprentice. Of these, Gifford cared only for the life of a student, and he continued to write verses as he learned the cobbler's trade. Gifford's fortunes changed when his first poetical efforts came to the attention of an Ashburton surgeon, William Cookesley. Cookesley raised a subscription to have the boy's apprenticeship bought out, and he returned to school.

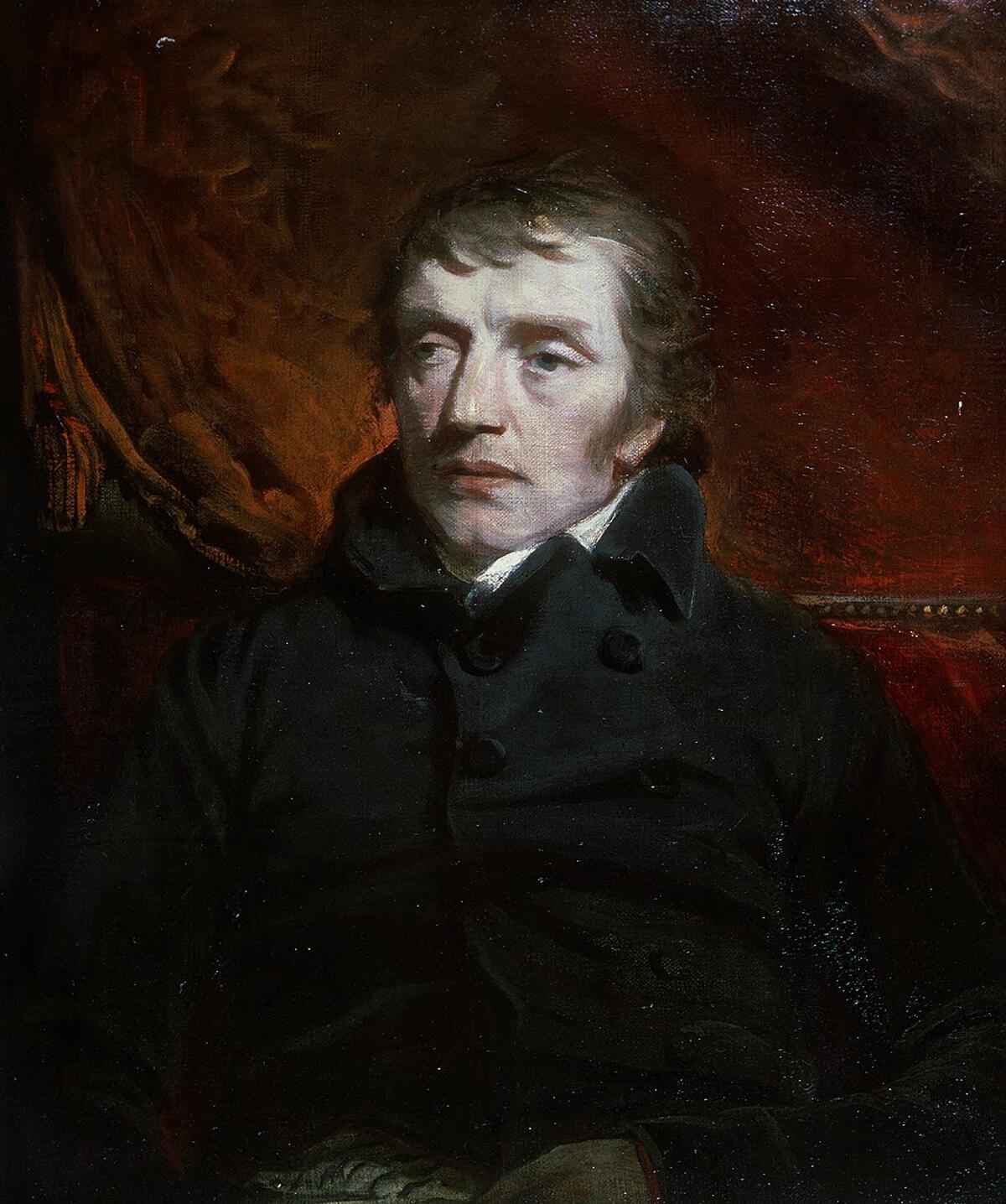
William Gifford (circa 1790)

By 1779 he had entered Exeter College, Oxford as a bible clerk (that is, a servitor), matriculating on 16 February 1779 and graduating B.A. 10 October 1782. Already while at Oxford, he had begun work on his translation of Juvenal. After graduation, he earned the patronage of Lord Grosvenor. He spent most of the ensuing decade as tutor to Grosvenor's son. In course of time he produced his first poem, The Baviad (1791), a satire directed against the Della Cruscans, a group of sentimental and to Gifford's conservative mentality dangerously radical poets. The Baviad is a 'paraphrastic' (that is, according to the OED, a work having 'the nature of a paraphrase') 'imitation' of the first satire of the Roman poet Persius (34–62 A.D.). Persius's satire deals with the degenerate state of contemporary literature. Both literature and literary taste have become corrupt, and for him as for Gifford, poetic corruption mirrors political corruption: the decline in modern poetry reflects the decline of modern morals.

The Baviad was followed by another satire, The Maeviad (1795), against some minor dramatists. His last effort in this line was his Epistle to Peter Pindar (Dr. John Wolcot) (1800), inspired by personal enmity, which evoked a reply, A Cut at a Cobbler and a public letter in which Wolcot threatened to horse-whip Gifford. Gifford and Wolcot met in Wright's bookshop in Piccadilly on 18 August 1800. According to most contemporary accounts, Wolcot attempted to cudgel Gifford; however, the diminutive but younger satirist wrested his stick from him and proceeded to lay about Wolcot, forcing him to flee down Piccadilly.

The earlier satirical writings had established Gifford as a keen, even ferocious critic, and he was appointed in 1797 editor of the Anti-Jacobin, which Canning and his friends had just started, and later of the Quarterly Review (1809–24). As editor of the Anti-Jacobin, Gifford published the pro-Tory satires and parodies of George Canning, John Hookham Frere, and George Ellis. Gifford edited The Poetry of the Anti-Jacobin in 1799.

By the turn of the century, Gifford's efforts as a poet were all but over, and he spent the rest of his career as an editor, scholar, and occasional critic. From 1809 to 1824, he edited the Quarterly Review; in this capacity, he became an icon of Tory journalism. Though he contributed rarely, his style marked the periodical in all respects. Gifford was popularly supposed to have penned the attack on Keats's Endymion (the review was actually by John Wilson Croker), which Percy Bysshe Shelley and Lord Byron erroneously blamed for bringing about the death of the poet, 'snuffed out', in Byron's phrase, 'by an article'. Contributors to the review included Charles Lamb, Walter Scott, and Robert Southey; the last had been among the poets satirised in the previous decade by the Anti-Jacobin.

His work as translator and editor was only slightly less contentious than his work as editor. The translation of Juvenal, published in 1800 earned high praise. Even William Hazlitt, elsewhere a frank enemy, praised the preface, in which Gifford describes his difficult childhood. This edition remained in print for the next century. Near the end of his life, he produced a translation of Persius. As an editor, Gifford shared the age's interest in Renaissance drama. He brought out editions of Massinger, Ben Jonson, and Ford, and began work on an edition of Shirley that was completed by Alexander Dyce.

Gifford gave up the editorship of the Quarterly in 1824, only two years before his own death; he was succeeded in that position by John Taylor Coleridge. John Gibson Lockhart took over in 1826.

Gifford never married, although he had a close, probably Platonic, relationship with Ann Davies, a servant; she died in 1815. His salary with the review amounted to nine hundred pounds a year by 1818, and his friendship with various wealthy Tories further insulated him from want. Indeed, when he died his will was proved at 25,000 pounds, the majority of which he bequeathed to the son of Cookesley, his first benefactor.

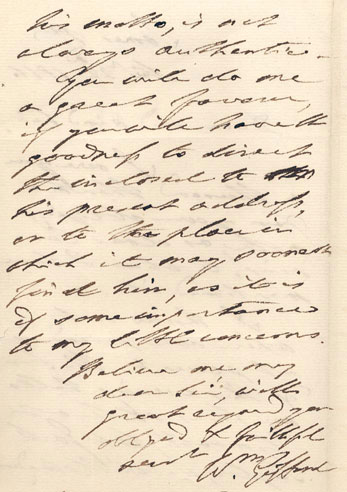
William Gifford letter

== Work ==
As a poet, Gifford is commonly judged to have reached his peak with the Baviad. In this work, which led to the more or less complete eclipse of the Della Cruscans, his lifelong tendency to unmoderated invective was restrained (though not completely) to produce a work that effectively satirised the Della Cruscan's sentimentality and tendency to absurd mutual compliment. In later work, his interest in vituperation is judged to have overwhelmed any element of wit. Still, Byron named him the best of the age's satirists. His satires are in heroic couplets after the manner of Alexander Pope; assorted other verse, little of it memorable, adopts the highly mannered style of the late eighteenth century.

As a critic he had acuteness; but he was one-sided, prejudiced, and savagely bitter, and much more influenced in his judgments by the political opinions than by the literary merits of his victims. These were traits he shared with his querulous and factional time; however, Gifford was among the most virulent practitioners of the art of partisan review. As an editor, he played an important role in the revival of Jonson's reputation after a period of neglect.

His satirical poems are included in volume 4 of British Satire 1785–1840, 5 vols (2003), ed. John Strachan. The Poetry of the Anti-Jacobin was edited by Graeme Stones in 1999 (Pickering and Chatto). Everyman publishes Gifford's Juvenal.

Kathryn Sutherland, professor of the Faculty of English Language and Literature at Oxford University, has studied the manuscript of a discarded chapter of Jane Austen's Persuasion and has conjectured that much of Austen's polished style is probably the result of editorial tidying by Gifford, who worked for the publisher John Murray. There is no direct evidence that Gifford edited the work, however.

== See also ==
- List of 18th-century British working-class writers
