= Celestina (novel) =

1791 novel by Charlotte Smith

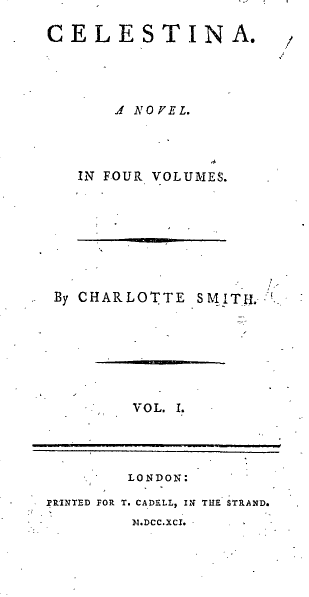
- Title page from the first edition of volume one of Celestina
- Author: Charlotte Smith
- Publisher: Thomas Cadell
- Publication date: 1971

Celestina is an eighteenth-century novel by English poet Charlotte Smith, her third. Published in 1791 by Thomas Cadell, the novel tells the story of an adopted orphan who discovers the secret of her parentage and marries the man she loves. It is a courtship novel that follows the typical Cinderella plot while still commenting on contemporary political issues.

Celestina is a satire of traditional English class and gender assumptions, particularly the idea that nobility is connected to rank or wealth. The heroine's worth lies in her "enlightened human soul"; she is valuable in and of herself. As a model for young readers, Celestina was liberating—she was independent and assertive. While Celestina is a heroine of sensibility who relies on her feelings to develop sympathy for others, it is the hero, Willoughby, who is the most sentimental of all, reversing the stereotypical association of strong emotions with femininity. In this novel, it is the women who remain strong and the men who are prey to their feelings.

Throughout the novel, Smith included portraits of herself and her husband. Readers were interested in her personal story and bought her works to discover what was happening in her life, therefore she included barely disguised autobiographical details in the novel.

The novel was well received by reviewers and eventually ran to four editions during the 1790s; however, the novel was not published again until the 2000s. Jane Austen, who read Smith's novels as they were published, responded to her description of sensibility with Sense and Sensibility.

== Plot summary ==
An orphaned Celestina is adopted from a convent in the south of France when she is a young girl by Mrs. Willoughby—nothing is known of her parentage. Celestina is raised along with Mrs. Willoughby's own children, Matilda and George. The children grow up happily. Mrs. Willoughby dies early in the novel, urging George to marry her brother's (Lord Castlenorth) daughter, Miss Fitz-Hayman, so that the family estate can be saved from financial ruin. Matilda marries Mr. Molyneux, becoming ambitious and haughty. She begins to despise Celestina and refuses her company.

Celestina becomes friends with a servant named Jessy and helps reunite her with her lover, Cathcart, who is George Willoughby's steward. Willoughby and Celestina discover that they love each other and decide to marry, despite the monetary impediments. Vavasour, Willoughby's friend, also becomes enamored of Celestina; he flees before the wedding. Unfortunately, on the evening before the marriage, Willoughby suddenly takes off and it is unclear whether he will ever return – Celestina is devastated.

Celestina moves in with the Thorolds, the local rector and his family, after Willoughby abandons her. Their son, Montague, develops an ardent attachment for her and she decides to leave to escape his overtures. Believing that Willoughby will eventually marry Miss Fitz-Hayman, Vavasour becomes an importunate suitor of Celestina, along with Montague. She is harassed. Willoughby reveals in a letter that Lady Castlenorth suggested to him that he and Celestina are brother and sister, and therefore cannot marry. He has therefore determined to go to France and discover the truth.

Celestina leaves the Thorods and tours Scotland with Mrs. Elphinstone, a relative of Cathcart and Jessy. Her life has been full of struggles. Her sister, Emily, became a "kept" woman and Mrs. Elphinstone was forced to accept money from her while she was poverty-stricken. Her husband dies in a tragic storm at sea while they are in Scotland. Montague pursues her Celestina to Scotland.

Celestina flees Scotland for London, establishing herself at Lady Horatia's. Lady Horatia encourages her to marry someone other than Willoughby. Willoughby returns to London, but because of miscommunication and interference of other parties, both he and Celestina believe the other is no longer interested. Willoughby agrees to marry Miss Fitz-Hayman to save his family's estate, but at the last minute he decides not to go through with it and she marries someone else. In the meantime, Montague and Vavasour duel over Celestina.

When Willougby travels to France to tell his uncle that he is no longer marrying Miss Fitz-Hayman, he discovers the secret of Celestina's birth when he stays with some peasants. The two are now free to marry.

== Genre and style ==
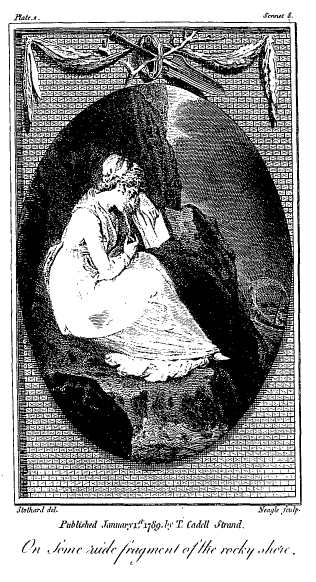
"On some rude fragment of the rocky shore... Musing, my solitary seat I take, And listen to the deep and solemn roar."

=== Courtship novel ===
Celestina is a "courtship novel", "which centres on a young girl's entrance into adult society and her choice among competing suitors". During the 18th century, the courtship novel allowed authors to comment on a wide range of social topics, including economics, gender roles, and politics. Often these novels followed a Cinderella pattern in which a virtuous orphan highlights the depravity of the seemingly respectable characters. However, in the end, the orphan usually turns out to be wealthy and a legitimate member of the aristocracy. Smith's first three novels—Emmeline (1788), Ethelinde (1789), and Celestina—follow this pattern but also contain unique elements; as Loraine Fletcher explains in her introduction to the Broadview Press edition of Celestina, all three have "self-possessed, reflective heroines, conflicting family relationships, acerbic radical satire, acceptance that marriage is a woman's goal but that great caution is necessary in achieving it, a more tolerant attitude to extramarital sex and the 'fallen' woman than is usually found in English novels of the 18th and 19th centuries, threatening castles emblematic of gender and national hierarchies, and contrasting locations including sublime mountains landscape".

=== Autobiography ===
Beginning with her Elegiac Sonnets in 1784, Smith included autobiographical material in her works, relaying "a saga of her own marital unhappiness, poverty and anxiety about her children". Readers purchased her works partially because they wanted to hear the unfolding story of her life. The narratives of Jessy and Sophy contain references to Smith's own life that readers of the Sonnets would have recognised and to which reviewers alluded. For example, Sophy's marriage to a merchant whose wealth was built on the slave trade, her suffering as a mother, and the loss of her children, all parallel Smith's own life. The heroine is widely read and a poet, signalling her connection with Smith. For Celestina, "literature is talismanic, her greatest help in times of trouble", as it was for Smith. Celestina takes a trip to the Hebrides where she writes poetry and watches her friend's husband die in a shipwreck, mimicking an illustration Thomas Stothard made for the fifth edition of the Sonnets. This section of the novel is particularly redolent with autobiographical references, with Benjamin Smith, Smith's husband, represented by Elphinstone, in a portrait that partially redeems him after his portrayal as Mr. Stafford in Emmeline. In her heroising of the author figure, Smith was helping to create Romanticism.

== Themes ==
=== Aristocracy and Enlightenment ===
Celestina is a satire of the accepted "definition of nobility as inherited rank"; for example, Matilda Willoughby, who marries Molyneux for his title, is skewered. The only character content with his rank is Lord Castlenorth—and he is senile. In contrast, Smith writes of the heroine:

if Celestina had any fault, it was a sort of latent pride, the child of conscious worth and elevated understanding; which, though she was certainly obscurely, and possibly dishonourably born, she never could subdue and, perhaps, never seriously tried to subdue it. She felt, that in point of intellect she was superior to almost every body she conversed with; she could not look into the glass without seeing the reflection of a form, worthy of so fair an inhabitant as an enlightened human soul.

Instead of being ashamed of her illegitimacy, Celestina prides herself on her valuable mind and body. Relying on the new idea of Enlightenment, found in the works of authors such as Rousseau and Voltaire, Smith "asserts the value of the small individual life and its rights to the pursuit of happiness". Celestina's actions, as related by the narrator, are models for young readers—and they are liberating. She is "confident", "socially assured", "articulate", and "decisive". As Fletcher explains, "Smith's feminine model is as independent as possible for an unmarried young woman in the middle or upper class who wished to remain socially acceptable".

=== Sensibility ===
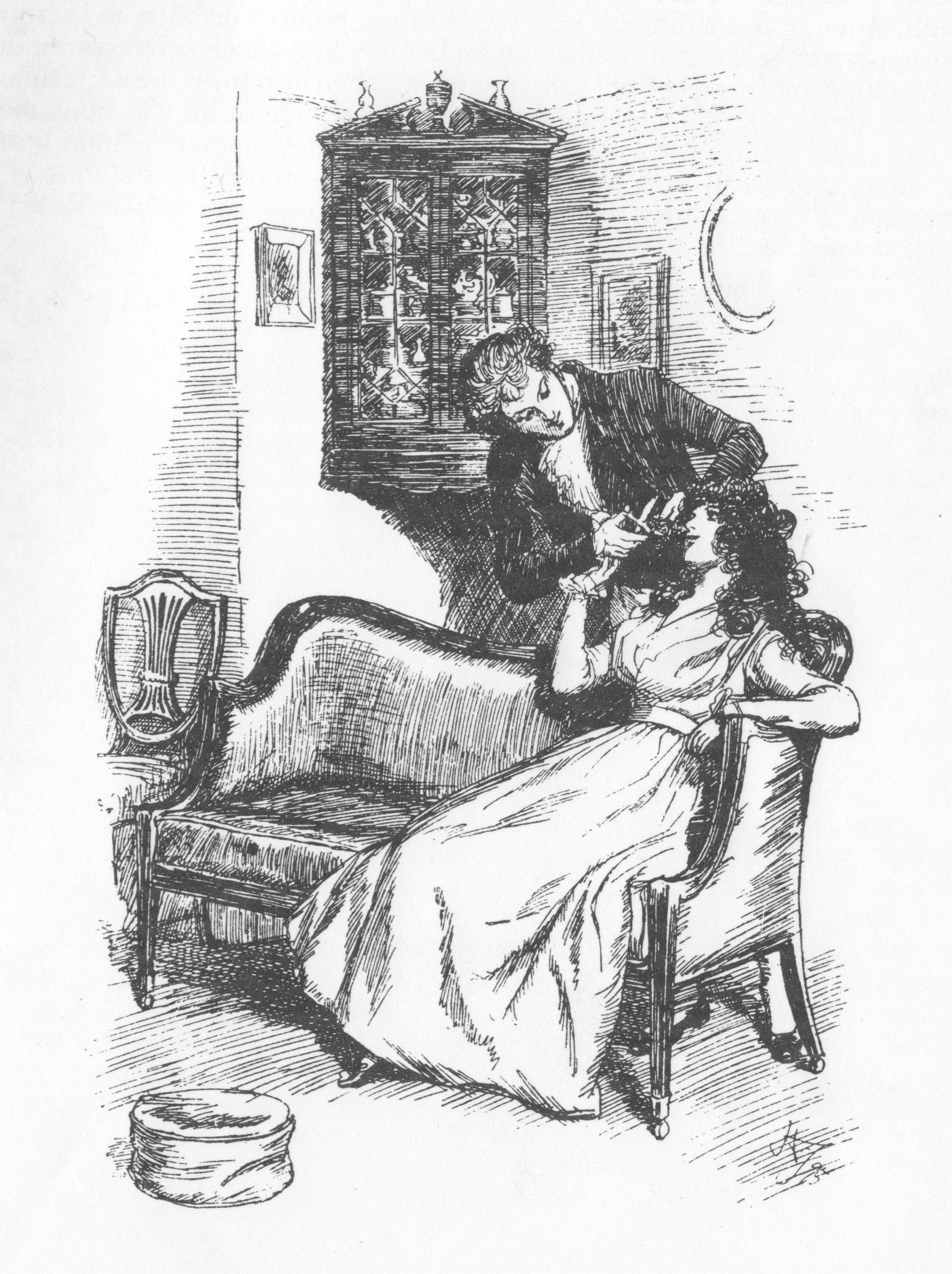
Jane Austen criticises the hero of sensibility in Sense and Sensibility by reimagining Smith's Willougby.

Within the first two volumes of the novel, there are two embedded narratives—the stories of Jessy and Sophy. Similar in tone and theme, these tales contain "family problems and bereavements, love, poverty and isolation". These two narratives suggest that "the truth of feeling [is] the only valid and useful bond of society". Jessy, Sophy, and Celestina are heroines of sensibility—characters who feel strongly and are sympathetic to the emotions of others. Willoughby is a hero of sensibility, feeling more strongly than any of the female characters. Unusually in Celestina, it is the women who show more "fortitude", while the men are often prey to their emotions. Yet it is only the characters capable of feeling true emotion who are moral; those who cannot feel or suffer are incapable of moral good.

Jane Austen, who avidly read Smith's novels, responded to Celestina with Sense and Sensibility (begun in the 1790s) and her own Willoughby. As a teenager Austen wrote parodies of heroes of sensibility, particularly those who focused on their own feelings and ignored their familial duties. Austen's novel parallels Smith's in its structure and setting: both are set primarily in Devonshire and London, for example, both have a heroine who writes an ill-advised letter to a lover. Fletcher notes that "the party scenes are so similar it is fair to assume that Austen initially intended a recognisable critique of Smith's [novel]". However, while Smith's Willoughby is exculpated from any wrongdoing, Austen's is not—her novel rejects the hero of sensibility, critiquing his "moodiness" and "abuse of hospitality".

=== Radicalism and the French Revolution ===
The last volume of the novel is decidedly political. Written as the Revolution Controversy was unfolding and begun five weeks after the storming of the Bastille, the novel reveals the tyranny of the ancien regime through Celestina's backstory. As the old aristocratic order is demolished in France, the expectation builds in the reader that such an occurrence needs to take place in England as well.

== Publication and reception ==
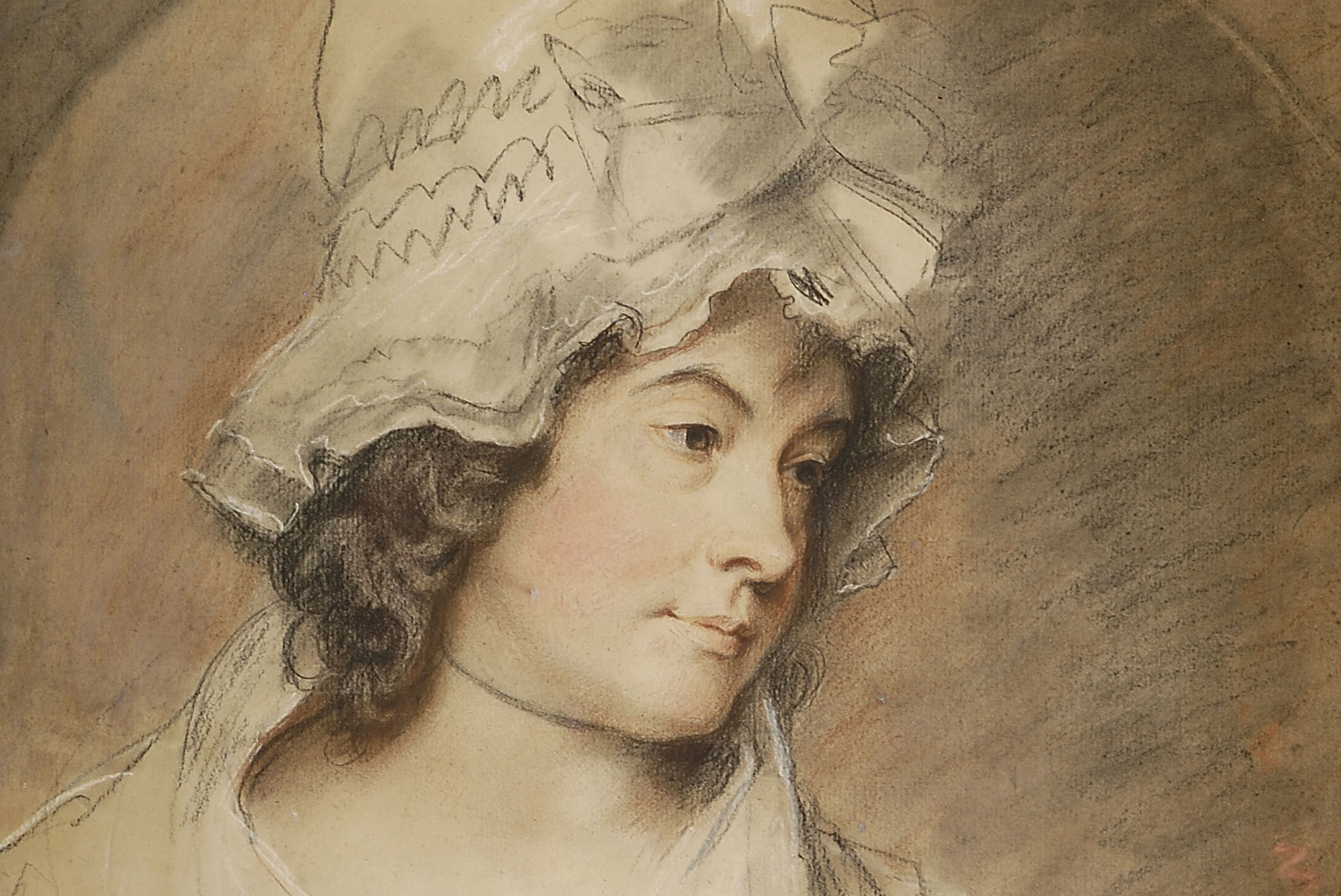
Charlotte Smith by George Romney

Celestina was published in four volumes in 1791 by Thomas Cadell, who had previously published Smith's Elegiac Sonnets, Emmeline, and Ethelinde. Cadell had become her friend and mentor, but he was averse to the radical views expressed in her works and refused to publish her next two novels, Desmond (1792) and The Old Manor House (1793). Celestina eventually ran to four English editions and a French translation, Celestine, ou la Victime des Préjugés, appeared in 1795. The novel was not published again in English until the Broadview Press edition of 2004.

Celestina was generally well received by reviewers, who praised its landscape descriptions. The reviewer for the European Magazine wrote that "if to delight the imagination by correct and brilliant descriptions of picturesque scenery, and to awaken the finest sympathies of the heart by well-formed representations of soft distress, be a test of excellence in novel-writing, the pen of Mrs. Smith unquestionably deserves the warmest praise." The reviewer for The Critical Review praised her characterisation and noted that some characters seemed to be drawn from real life.

== See also ==
- 18th century in literature

== Bibliography ==
- Fletcher, Loraine. "Introduction". Celestina. Peterborough: Broadview Press, 2004. ISBN 1-55111-458-5.
