= 18th century in literature =

Eighteenth century literature

Literature of the 18th century refers to world literature produced during the years 1700–1799.

== European literature in the 18th century ==
European literature of the 18th century refers to literature (poetry, drama, satire, essays, and novels) produced in Europe during this period. The 18th century saw the development of the modern novel as literary genre, in fact many candidates for the first novel in English date from this period, of which Daniel Defoe's 1719 Robinson Crusoe is probably the best known. Subgenres of the novel during the 18th century were the epistolary novel, the sentimental novel, histories, the gothic novel and the libertine novel.

18th century Europe started in the Age of Enlightenment and gradually moved towards Romanticism. In the visual arts, it was the period of Neoclassicism.

=== The Enlightenment ===
The 18th century in Europe was the Age of Enlightenment, and literature explored themes of social upheaval, reversals of personal status, political satire, geographical exploration and the comparison between the supposed natural state of man and the supposed civilized state of man. Edmund Burke, in his A Vindication of Natural Society (1756), says: "The Fabrick of Superstition has in this our Age and Nation received much ruder Shocks than it had ever felt before; and through the Chinks and Breaches of our Prison, we see such Glimmerings of Light, and feel such refreshing Airs of Liberty, as daily raise our Ardor for more."

=== Translations ===
Translations of foreign-language works became ever-more ubiquitous in Europe in the 18th century. Works translated from French to English and vice versa were particularly common, but works written in nearly all major world languages, from Arabic to Greek, likewise proliferated. In 1708, Simon Ockley translated Ibn Tufail's Hayy ibn Yaqdhan directly from Arabic to English for the first time, while Michael Wodhull was the first to translate all the extant writing of Euripides into English, with his work published in four volumes in 1782.

Translations in the eighteenth century were typically liberal and loose, as it was common for translators to alter the text to appeal more to their intended audience and to add their own original work to it. John Lockman, for example, described his French translations as "versions" to indicate the large changes he'd made to the original text. Unclear labeling further complicated matters, resulting in complicated translation loops. In some cases, works of fiction were translated from French to English and, later, from English back into French, with the second translator being unaware that the work they were translating was not the original.

Notable eighteenth-century translators from Asia included Sugita Genpaku, who translated the Dutch medical work Kaitai Shinsho into Japanese in 1774, making it among the first Western works to be translated in Japan.

== English literature in the 18th century by year ==
=== 1700–1709 ===
1700: William Congreve's play The Way of the World premiered. Although unsuccessful at the time, The Way of the World is a good example of the sophistication of theatrical thinking during this period, with complex subplots and characters intended as ironic parodies of common stereotypes.

1703: Nicholas Rowe's domestic drama The Fair Penitent, an adaptation of Massinger and Field's Fatal Dowry, appeared; it would later be pronounced by Dr Johnson to be one of the most pleasing tragedies in the language. Also in 1703 Sir Richard Steele's comedy The Tender Husband achieved some success.

1704: Jonathan Swift (Irish satirist) published A Tale of a Tub and The Battle of the Books and John Dennis published his Grounds of Criticism in Poetry. The Battle of the Books begins with a reference to the use of a glass (which, in those days, would mean either a mirror or a magnifying glass) as a comparison to the use of satire. Swift is, in this, very much the child of his age, thinking in terms of science and satire at one and the same time. Swift often patterned his satire after Juvenal, the classical satirist. He was one of the first English novelists and also a political campaigner. His satirical writing springs from a body of liberal thought which produced not only books but also political pamphlets for public distribution. Swift's writing represents the new, the different and the modern attempting to change the world by parodying the ancient and incumbent. The Battle of the Books is a short writing which demonstrates his position very neatly.

1706: Dildoides: A Burlesque Poem was published in London, attributed on its title page to Samuel Butler (an attribution rejected by modern scholarship) and sometimes credited to Sir Charles Sedley.

1707: Henry Fielding was born on 22 April.

1711: Alexander Pope began a career in literature with the publishing of his An Essay on Criticism.

1712: French philosophical writer Jean Jacques Rousseau was born on 28 June and his countryman Denis Diderot was born the following year 1713 on 5 October. Also in 1712 Pope published The Rape of the Lock and in 1713 Windsor Forest.

1709: Samuel Johnson was born on 18 September in Lichfield, Staffordshire.

=== 1710–1719 ===
1717: Horace Walpole was born on 24 September.

Daniel Defoe was another political pamphleteer turned novelist like Jonathan Swift and was publishing in the early 18th century. In 1719, he published Robinson Crusoe.

1719: Eliza Haywood published Love in Excess, an unusually sympathetic portrayal of a fallen woman.

Also in 1719: Alexander Smith was a biographer who published A Complete History of the Lives and Robberies of the Most Notorious Highwaymen. The book includes heavily fictionalised accounts of English criminals from the medieval period to the eighteenth century.

=== 1720–1729 ===
1720: Daniel Defoe's Captain Singleton was published.

1722: Daniel Defoe's Moll Flanders and A Journal of the Plague Year were published.

1726: Jonathan Swift published Gulliver's Travels, one of the first novels in the genre of satire.

1728: John Gay wrote The Beggar's Opera which has increased in fame ever since. The Beggar's Opera began a new style in Opera, the "ballad opera" which brings the operatic form down to a more popular level and precedes the genre of comic operettas. Also in 1728 came the publication of Cyclopaedia, or, A Universal Dictionary of Arts and Sciences (folio, 2 vols.), an encyclopedia by Ephraim Chambers. The Cyclopaedia was one of the first general encyclopedias to be produced in English and was the main model for Diderot's Encyclopédie (published in France between 1751 and 1766).

1729: Jonathan Swift published A Modest Proposal, a satirical suggestion that Irish families should sell their children as food. Swift was, at this time, fully involved in political campaigning for the Irish.

=== 1730–1739 ===
1731: George Lillo's play The London Merchant was a success at the Theatre-Royal in Drury Lane. It was a new kind of play, a domestic tragedy, which approximates to what later came to be called a melodrama.

1738: Samuel Johnson published London, a poem in imitation of Juvenal’s Third Satire. Like so many poets of the 18th century, Johnson sought to breathe new life into his favorite classical author Juvenal.

=== 1740–1749 ===
1740: Samuel Richardson's Pamela, or Virtue Rewarded was published and the Marquis de Sade was born.

1744: Alexander Pope died, and in 1745 Jonathan Swift died.

1746: Tobias Smollett's first poem "The Tears of Scotland", about the Battle of Culloden, was published.

1748: John Cleland's Memoirs of a Woman of Pleasure (popularly known as Fanny Hill), arguably the first work of pornographic prose, was published. Also in 1748, Samuel Richardson's Clarissa; or, The History of a Young Lady was published; finally, Tobias Smollett's first picaresque quasi-autobiographical novel The Adventures of Roderick Random was also published.

1749: Henry Fielding's The History of Tom Jones, a Foundling was published. His sister Sarah Fielding also published The Governess, the first full-length novel written for children.

=== 1750–1759 ===
1751: Thomas Gray wrote Elegy Written in a Country Churchyard.

Also in 1751, Denis Diderot began the Encyclopédie, ou dictionnaire raisonné des sciences, des arts et des métiers. Over the next three decades Encyclopédie attracted, alongside of those from Diderot, notable contributions from other notable intellectuals of the 18th century including Voltaire, Jean-Jacques Rousseau and Louis de Jaucourt.

1754: Henry Fielding died.

1755: Samuel Johnson completed his influential Dictionary of the English Language, sometimes published as Johnson's Dictionary, and at the time a huge improvement on previously available dictionaries. It was a daunting task that took nine years in all, two years of preparation and seven years of research and writing.

=== 1760–1769 ===
1760–1767: Laurence Sterne wrote Tristram Shandy.

1761: Samuel Richardson died.

1764: Horace Walpole published The Castle of Otranto (initially under a pseudonym and claiming it to be a translation of an Italian work from 1529); the first gothic novel.

1766: Oliver Goldsmith's The Vicar of Wakefield was published.

=== 1770–1779 ===
1770: William Wordsworth was born on 7 April.

1771: Tobias Smollett published his epistolatory novel, The Expedition of Humphry Clinker just three months before his death.

1773: Oliver Goldsmith's play She Stoops to Conquer, a farce, was performed in London.

1776: The United States Declaration of Independence was created and ratified.

1777: The play The School for Scandal, a comedy of manners by Richard Brinsley Sheridan, was first performed in Drury Lane.

1778: Frances Burney published Evelina anonymously.

1779–1781: Samuel Johnson wrote and published Lives of the Most Eminent English Poets. This compilation contains short biographies of 52 influential poets (most of whom lived in the 18th century) along with critical appraisals of their works. Most notable are Alexander Pope, John Dryden, John Milton, Jonathan Swift, and Joseph Addison.

=== 1780–1789 ===
1783: Washington Irving was born.

1784: Samuel Johnson died on 13 December.

1785: William Cowper published The Task, a volume of poetry in blank verse.

1786: Robert Burns published Poems Chiefly in the Scottish Dialect. The mood of literature was swinging toward more interest in diverse ethnicity. Beaumarchais' The Marriage of Figaro (La Folle journée ou Le Mariage de Figaro) was adapted into a comic opera composed by Wolfgang Amadeus Mozart, with libretto by Lorenzo da Ponte.

1789: James Fenimore Cooper was born on 15 September. Also in 1789, The Interesting Narrative of the Life of Olaudah Equiano, one of the first slave narratives to have been widely read in historical times, was published.

=== 1790–1799 ===
1792: Percy Bysshe Shelley was born on 4 August.

1793: Salisbury Plain was published by William Wordsworth.

1794: Ann Radcliffe published her most famous Gothic novel, The Mysteries of Udolpho.

1795: Samuel Taylor Coleridge met William Wordsworth and his sister Dorothy. The two men published a joint volume of poetry, Lyrical Ballads (1798), which became a central text of Romantic poetry.

1796: Matthew Lewis published his controversial anti-Catholic gothic novel The Monk and Charlotte Smith published her novel Marchmont. Also in 1796, Mary Hays published her outspoken novel Memoirs of Emma Courtney.

== Other literature in the 18th century by year ==
=== 1700-1739 ===
From 1704 to 1717, Antoine Galland published One Thousand and One Nights (also known as The Arabian Nights in English), based on Arabian folk tales. His version of the tales appeared in twelve volumes and exerted a huge influence on subsequent European literature and attitudes to the Islamic world. Galland's translation of the Nights was immensely popular throughout Europe, and later versions of the Nights were written by Galland's publisher using Galland's name without his consent.

In 1707, playwright Carlo Goldoni was born.

In 1729, Gotthold Ephraim Lessing was born.

In 1731, Manon Lescaut, a French novel by the Abbé Prévost that narrates the love affairs of an unmarried couple and inaugurates one of the most common themes of the literature of the time: the sentimental story, taking into account for the first time the female point of view and not only the courtship and the conquest or the failure of man.

=== 1740–1769 ===
1743 Gavrila Derzhavin was born.

1752 Micromégas, a satirical short story by Voltaire, features space travellers visiting Earth. It is one of the first stories to feature several elements of what will later become known as science fiction. Its publication at this time is also indicative of the trend toward scientific thinking that characterizes the Enlightenment.

1759 Voltaire's Candide/Optimism was published. On November 10, Johann Christoph Friedrich von Schiller is born.

1761 Jean Jacques Rousseau's Julie, ou la nouvelle Héloïse was published.

1762 Jean Jacques Rousseau's Émile was published.

1767 September 8: August Wilhelm von Schlegel was born.

=== 1770–1800 ===
1772 March 10: Karl Wilhelm Friedrich von Schlegel was born.

- German poet Novalis was born.

1774 Goethe wrote The Sorrows of Young Werther, a novel which approximately marks the beginning of the Romanticism movement in the arts and philosophy. A transition thus began from the critical, science-inspired, Enlightenment writing to the romantic yearning for forces beyond the mundane and for foreign times and places to inspire the soul with passion and mystery.

Also in 1774, Alberto Fortis published his travel book Viaggio in Dalmazia ("Journey to Dalmatia") and started Morlachism.

1776 Ignacy Krasicki published the first novel in Polish, The Adventures of Mr. Nicholas Wisdom.

1778 Death of Voltaire, 30 May. Death of Jean Jacques Rousseau, 2 July. Two major contributors to Diderot's Encyclopédie died in the same year.

1784 Denis Diderot died 31 July. Voltaire, Rousseau and Diderot have all died within a period of a few years, and French philosophy had thus lost three of its greatest enlightened free thinkers. Rousseau's thoughts on the nobility of life in the wilds, facing nature as a naked savage, still had great force to influence the next generation as the Romantic movement gained momentum. Beaumarchais wrote The Marriage of Figaro. Maria and Harriet Falconar publish Poems on Slavery. The anti-slavery movement was growing in power, and many poems and pamphlets were published on the subject.

1791 Dream of the Red Chamber was published for the first time in movable type format.

1793 August 25: John Neal was born.

1796 Denis Diderot's Jacques le fataliste was published posthumously.

== See also ==
- 18th-century French literature
- Novel#18th-century novels
- List of years in literature#1800s
- Neoclassicism
- English literature
  - Augustan literature
  - Amatory fiction
- German literature
  - German Romanticism
  - Sturm und Drang
- 18th century in poetry
