= Charlotte Smith (writer) =

English poet and novelist (1749–1806)

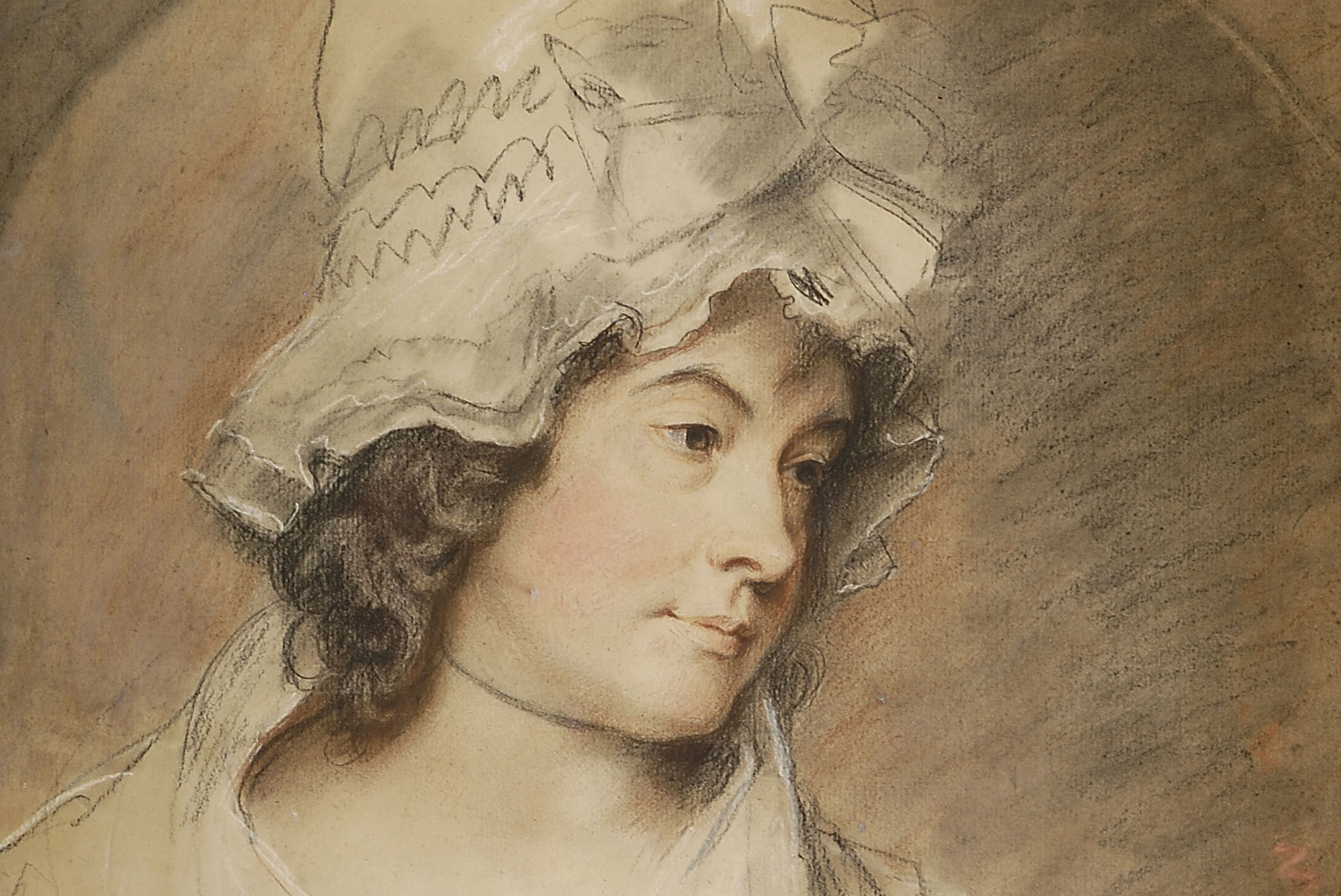
- Born: Charlotte Turner; 4 May 1749; London, Great Britain
- Died: 28 October 1806 (aged 57); Tilford, United Kingdom
- Occupations: Poet and novelist
- Writing career
- Notable works: Elegiac Sonnets (1784); Desmond (1792); The Emigrants (1793); The Old Manor House (1793); Beachy Head (1807)

Charlotte Smith (née Turner; 4 May 1749 – 28 October 1806) was an English novelist and poet of the School of Sensibility whose Elegiac Sonnets (1784) contributed to the revival of the form in England. She also helped to set conventions for Gothic fiction and wrote political novels of sensibility. Despite her eleven novels, four children's books and other works, she saw herself mainly as a poet and expected to be remembered for that.

Smith left her husband and began writing to support their children. Her struggles for legal independence as a woman affect her poetry, novels and autobiographical prefaces. She is credited with turning the sonnet into an expression of woeful sentiment and her early novels show development in sentimentality. Later novels such as Desmond (1792) and The Old Manor House (1793) praised the ideals of the French Revolution. Waning interest left her destitute by 1803. Barely able to hold a pen, she sold her book collection to pay debts and died in 1806. Her poem Beachy Head (1807) was published posthumously. Largely forgotten by the mid-19th century, she has since been seen as a major Romantic precursor.

== Early life ==
Charlotte Turner was born on 4 May 1749 in London and baptised on 12 June as the oldest child of well-to-do Nicholas Turner and Anna Towers. Her two siblings, Nicholas and Catherine Ann, were born over the next five years. Smith received a typical girl's education in a wealthy, late 18th-century family. Her childhood was marked by her mother's early death (probably giving birth to Catherine) and her father's reckless spending. After losing his wife, Nicholas Turner travelled and the children were raised by Lucy Towers, their maternal aunt; when exactly their father returned is unknown.

At the age of six, Charlotte went to school in Chichester and took drawing lessons from the painter George Smith. Two years later, she, her aunt and her sister moved to London, where she attended a girls' school in Kensington and learned dancing, drawing, music and acting. She loved to read and wrote poems, which her father encouraged. She even submitted a few to the Lady's Magazine for publication, but they were not accepted.

== Marriage and first publication ==
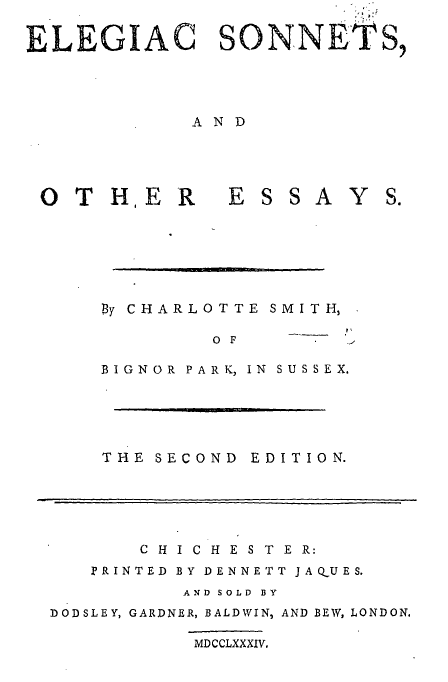
Smith signed herself "Charlotte Smith of Bignor Park" on the title page of Elegiac Sonnets, claiming the role of gentlewoman.

Nicholas Turner met with financial difficulties on his return to England and had to sell some of the family's holdings. He married the wealthy Henrietta Meriton in 1765. His daughter entered society at the age of 12, leaving school and being tutored at home. His reckless spending then forced her to marry early. In a marriage on 23 February 1765 at the age of 15, she was given by her father to a violent, profligate man, Benjamin Smith, son of Richard Smith, a wealthy West Indian merchant and a director of the East India Company. The marriage proposal was accepted for her by her father. Condemning his action 40 years later, Smith said it had turned her into a "legal prostitute".

The Smiths had twelve children. Their first, in 1766, died the next year just days after the birth of their second, Benjamin Berney (1767–1777). (Note: Benjamin's sister Mary was married twice. Her first husband's family name was Berney, her second's Dyer.) Their ten more children between 1767 and 1785 were William Towers (born 1768), Charlotte Mary (born 1769), Braithwaite (born 1770), Nicholas Hankey (1771–1837), Charles Dyer (born 1773), Anna Augusta (1774–1794), Lucy Eleanor (born 1776), Lionel (1778–1842), Harriet (born c. 1782), and George (born c. 1785). Six of their children survived her.

The Smith marriage was unhappy. She detested living in commercial Cheapside (the family later moved to Southgate and Tottenham) and argued with her in-laws, whom she saw as unrefined and uneducated. They in turn mocked her for spending time reading, writing and drawing. Meanwhile Benjamin proved violent, unfaithful and profligate. Only her father-in-law, Richard, appreciated her writing abilities, although he wanted her to use them to further his business interests. Richard Smith owned plantations in Barbados, which provided the income of £2000 a year upon which Charlotte Smith and her family lived. Smith would later criticize slavery in works such as The Old Manor House (1793) and Beachy Head (1807).

She persuaded Richard to set Benjamin up as a gentleman farmer in Hampshire and lived with him from 1774 until 1783 at Lys Farm, Bramdean, about 10 miles east of Winchester. Worried about Charlotte's future and that of his grandchildren and concerned that his son would continue his irresponsible ways, Richard Smith willed most of his property to Charlotte's children. However, he drew up the will himself and it contained legal problems. The inheritance, originally worth nearly £36,000, was tied up in chancery after his death in 1776 for almost 40 years. Smith and her children saw little of it. (It has been proposed that this may have inspired the famous fictional case of interminable legal proceedings, Jarndyce and Jarndyce, in Dickens's Bleak House.

In fact, Benjamin illegally spent at least a third of the legacy and ended up in King's Bench Prison, a debtor's prison, in December 1783. Smith moved in with him and it was there that she wrote and published her first work. Elegiac Sonnets (1784) achieved instant success, allowing Charlotte to pay for their release from prison. Smith's sonnets helped initiate a revival of the form and granted an aura of respectability to her later novels, as poetry was then considered the highest art. Smith revised Elegiac Poems several times over the years, eventually creating a two-volume work.

== Novelist and poet ==
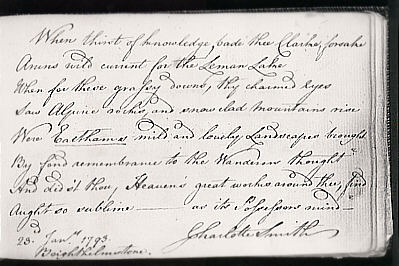
Smith believed that her poetry, not her novels, granted her respectability.

Smith's husband fled to France to escape his creditors. She joined him there until, thanks largely to her, he was able to return to England.

After Benjamin Smith was released from prison, the entire family moved to Dieppe, France to avoid further creditors. Charlotte returned to negotiate with them, but failed to come to an agreement. She went back to France and in 1784 began translating works from French into English. In 1787 she published The Romance of Real Life, consisting of translated selections on François Gayot de Pitaval's trials. She was forced to withdraw her other translation, Manon Lescaut, after it was argued that the work was immoral and plagiarised. In 1786, she published it anonymously.

In 1785, the family returned to England and moved to Woolbeding House near Midhurst, Sussex. Smith's relations with her husband did not improve and on 15 April 1787 she left him after 22 years of marriage, writing that she might "have been contented to reside in the same house with him" had not "his temper been so capricious and often so cruel," so that her "life was not safe". When Charlotte left Benjamin, she did not secure a legal agreement to protect her profits – he would have access to them under English primogeniture laws. Smith knew that her children's future rested on a successful settlement of the lawsuit over her father-in-law's will, and so made every effort to earn enough money to fund the suit and retain the family's genteel status.

Smith claimed the position of gentlewoman, signing herself "Charlotte Smith of Bignor Park" on the title page of Elegiac Sonnets. All her works were published under her own name, "a daring decision" for a woman at the time. Her success as a poet allowed her to make this choice and she identified herself as a poet throughout her career. Although she published far more prose than poetry and her novels brought her more money and fame, she believed poetry would bring her respectability. As Sarah Zimmerman claimed in the Oxford Dictionary of National Biography, "She prized her verse for the role it gave her as a private woman whose sorrows were submitted only reluctantly to the public."

After leaving her husband, Smith moved to a town near Chichester and decided to write novels, as they would make more money than poetry. Her first one, Emmeline (1788), was a success, selling 1500 copies within months. She wrote ten more in the next ten years: Ethelinde (1789), Celestina (1791), Desmond (1792), The Old Manor House (1793), The Wanderings of Warwick (1794), The Banished Man (1794), Montalbert (1795), Marchmont (1796), The Young Philosopher (1798), and Letters of a Solitary Wanderer (1800, 1802). Smith was beginning her novelist career at a time when women's fiction was expected to focus on romance and to focus on "a chaste and flawless heroine subjected to repeated melodramatic distresses until reinstated in society by the virtuous hero". Although Smith's novels employed this structure, they also included political commentary, notably support of the French Revolution through her male characters. At times, she challenged the typical romance plot by including "narratives of female desire" or "tales of females suffering despotism". Her novels contributed to the development of Gothic fiction and the novel of sensibility.

Smith's novels include autobiographical characters and events. While a common device at the time, Antje Blank writes in The Literary Encyclopedia, "few exploited fiction's potential of self-representation with such determination as Smith." For example, Mr and Mrs Stafford in Emmeline are portraits of Charlotte and Benjamin. She suffered sorely throughout her life. Her mother died in childbirth when Charlotte was three. Charlotte's own first child died a day after her second child, Benjamin Berney, was born and Benjamin lived only ten years. The prefaces to Smith's novels told of her own struggles, including the deaths of several of her children. According to Zimmerman, "Smith mourned most publicly for her daughter Anna Augusta, who married an émigré... and died aged twenty in 1795." Smith's prefaces placed her as a suffering sentimental heroine and as a vocal critic of laws that kept her and her children in poverty.

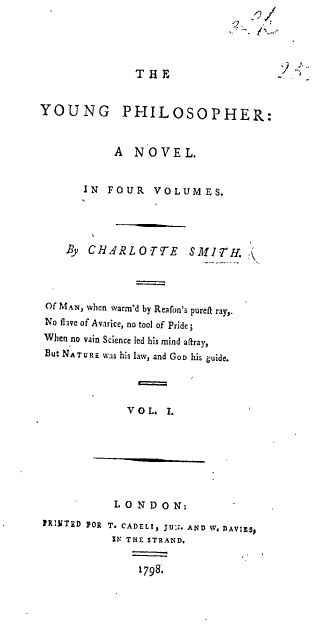
The Young Philosopher was Smith's last novel and a piece of "outspoken radical fiction".

Smith's experiences led her to argue for legal reforms that would grant women more rights, making the case for these in her novels. Her stories showed the "legal, economic, and sexual exploitation" of women by marriage and property laws. Initially readers were swayed by her arguments; writers such as William Cowper patronised her. However, as years passed readers became exhausted by Smith's stories of struggle and inequality. The public shifted to the view of the poet Anna Seward, who called Smith "vain" and "indelicate" for exposing her husband to "public contempt".

Smith moved frequently due to financial concerns and declining health. In the last 20 years of her life, she lived in: Chichester, Brighton, Storrington, Bath, Exmouth, Weymouth, Oxford, London, Frant, and Elstead. She eventually settled at Tilford, Surrey.

Smith became involved with English radicals while living in Brighton in 1791–1793. Like them, she supported the French Revolution and its republican principles. Her epistolary novel Desmond tells of a man journeying to revolutionary France and convinced of the rightness of the revolution. He contends that England should be reformed as well. The novel was published in June 1792, a year before France and Britain went to war and before the Reign of Terror began, which shocked the public, turning them against the revolutionaries. Like many radicals, Smith criticised the French, but retained the original ideals of the revolution. To support her family, Smith had to sell her works, and so was eventually forced, as Blank claims, to "tone down the radicalism that had characterised the authorial voice in Desmond and adopt more oblique techniques to express her libertarian ideals". She set her next novel, The Old Manor House (1793) in the American War of Independence, which allowed her to discuss democratic reform without directly addressing the French situation. However, her last novel, The Young Philosopher (1798), was a final piece of "outspoken radical fiction". Her protagonist leaves Britain for a more hopeful America.

The Old Manor House is "frequently deemed [Smith's] best" novel for its sentimental themes and development of minor characters. Novelist Walter Scott labelled it as such, and poet and critic Anna Laetitia Barbauld chose it for her book series The British Novelists (1810). As a successful novelist and poet, Smith communicated with famous artists and thinkers of the day, including musician Charles Burney (father of Frances Burney), poet Samuel Taylor Coleridge, scientist and poet Erasmus Darwin, lawyer and radical Thomas Erskine, novelist Mary Hays, playwright Richard Brinsley Sheridan, and poet Robert Southey. An array of periodicals reviewed her works, including the Anti-Jacobin Review, the Analytical Review, the British Critic, The Critical Review, the European Magazine, the Gentleman's Magazine, the Monthly Magazine, and the Universal Magazine.

Smith earned most money between 1787 and 1798, after which she was no longer so popular; several reasons have been given for the declining public interest, including "erosion of the quality of her work after so many years of literary labour, an eventual waning of readerly interest as she published, on average, one work per year for twenty-two years, and a controversy that attached to her public profile" as she wrote on the French Revolution. Both radical and conservative periodicals criticized her novels about the revolution. Her insistence on pursuing a lawsuit over Richard Smith's inheritance lost her several patrons. Her increasingly blunt prefaces made her less appealing.

To continue earning money, Smith sought employment as a botanical colourist through the botanist James Edward Smith (no relation). That did not materialize, though this connection appears to have catalysed her later botanical writings. After 1798, Smith began writing in less politically charged genres than previously. This included a collection of tales, Letters of a Solitary Wanderer (1801–1802) and the play What Is She? (1799, attributed). Her most successful foray was into children's books: Rural Walks (1795), Rambles Farther (1796), Minor Morals (1798), and Conversations Introducing Poetry (1804). She also wrote two volumes of a history of England (1806) and A Natural History of Birds (1807, posthumous). Her return to poetry, Beachy Head and Other Poems (1807) also appeared posthumously. Publishers paid less for these, however, and by 1803 Smith was poverty-stricken. She could barely afford food or coal. She even sold her beloved library of 500 books to pay off debts, but feared being sent to jail for the remaining £20.

== Illness and death ==
Smith complained of gout for many years (it was likely rheumatoid arthritis), which made it increasingly difficult and painful for her to write. By the end of her life, it had almost paralysed her. She wrote to a friend that she was "literally vegetating, for I have very little locomotive powers beyond those that appertain to a cauliflower." On 23 February 1806, her husband died in a debtors' prison and Smith finally received some money he owed her, but she was too ill to do anything with it. She died at Tilford a few months later, on 28 October 1806, and was buried at Stoke Church, Stoke Park, near Guildford. The lawsuit over her father-in-law's estate was settled seven years later, on 22 April 1813, more than 36 years after Richard Smith's death.

== Literary circle ==
Smith's novels were read and assessed by friends who were also writers, as she would return the favour and they found it beneficial to improve and encourage each other's work. Ann Radcliffe, who also wrote Gothic fiction, was among those friends. Along with praise, Smith also received backlash from other writers. "Jane Austen – though she ridiculed Smith's novels, actually borrowed plot, character, and incident from them." John Bennet (1792) wrote that "the little sonnets of Miss Charlotte Smith are soft, pensive, sentimental and pathetic, as a woman's productions should be. The muses, if I mistake not, will, in time, raise her to a considerable eminence. She has, as yet, stepped forth only in little things, with a diffidence that is characteristic of real genius in its first attempts. Her next public entre may be more in style, and more consequential." Smith is never too specific about her republicanism; her ideas rest on the scholars Rousseau, Voltaire Diderot, Montesquieu, and John Locke. "Charlotte Smith tried not to swim too strongly against the current of public view, because she needed to sell her novels in order to provide for her children."

Robert Southey, a poet and contributor to the early Romanticist movement, also sympathised with Smith's hardships. He says, "[although] she has done more and done better than other women writers, it has not been her whole employment — she is not looking out for admiration and talking to show off." (Note: Peacock 1969, quoting Wordsworth 1835) In addition to Jane Austen, Henrietta O'Neill, Reverend Joseph Cooper Walker, and Sarah Rose were people Smith saw as trusted friends. Having become famous for marrying into a great Irish home, Henrietta O'Neill, like Austen, provided Smith "with a poetic, sympathetic friendship and with literary connections," helping her gain an "entry into a fashionable, literary world to which she otherwise had little access; here she almost certainly met Dr. Moore (author of A View of Society and Manners in Italy and Zeluco) and Lady Londonderry.

One of Smith's longest friends and respected mentors was Reverend Joseph Cooper Walker, a Dublin antiquarian and writer. "Walker handled her dealings with John Rice, who published Dublin editions of many of her works. She confided openly in Walker about literary and familial matters." Through publication of personal letters Smith sent to a close companion, Sarah Rose, readers are shown a more positive and joyful side to Smith. Although today his writing is seen as mediocre, William Hayley, another friend of Smith's, was "liked, respected, influential" in their time, especially as he was offered the laureateship on the death of Thomas Warton." As time went on, Hayley withdrew support from her in 1794 and corresponded with her only infrequently. Smith saw Hayley's actions as betrayal; he would often make claims that she was a "Lady of signal sorrows, signal woes." Even with her success as a writer and handful of accredited friends through her lifetime, Smith was "sadly isolated from other writers and literary friends." Although many believed in Hayley's statements, many saw Smith as a "woman of signal achievement, energy, ambition, devotion, and sacrifice. Her children and her literary career evoked from her best efforts, and did so in about equal measure."

== Legacy and critical reputation ==
Stuart Curran, as editor of Smith's poems, has written that she is "the first poet in England whom in retrospect we would call Romantic". She helped shape the "patterns of thought and conventions of style" for the period and was responsible for rekindling the sonnet form in England. She influenced popular Romantic poets of her time such as, William Wordsworth and John Keats. Wordsworth, the leading Romantic poet, believed that Smith wrote "with true feeling for rural nature, at a time when nature was not much regarded by English Poets". He also stated in the 1830s that she was "a lady to whom English verse is under greater obligations than are likely to be either acknowledged or remembered." By the mid-19th century, however, Smith was largely forgotten. Smith was respected also for her ten novels, publishing works in a variety of genres. These include Gothic, revolutionary, educational, epistolary but always incorporating the novel of sensibility. Although they have yet to receive any "critical attention" today, Smith was famous for children's books she wrote in her writing period. Smith is noted as one of the most popular poets of her time. One of the first poets to receive a salary, Henry James Pye claimed Smith was "[excelled] in two species of composition so different as the novel and the sonnet, and whose powers are so equally capable of charming the imagination, and awakening the passions."

Smith is known for striving to produce her writing at the same level and expectation as her contemporaries Anna Laetitia Barbauld and Maria Edgeworth. The inspiration she received from these writers helped her build an audience and dominate in certain genres. Smith was notorious for not only expressing her personal and emotional struggles but also for the anxiety and complications she faced when it came to meeting deadlines, mailing out completed volumes, and payment advancements. She was keen in persuading her publishers to work with her issues. Smith would submit final drafts in exchange for "food, lodging, and expenses for her children". Other publishers willing to negotiate with Smith throughout her career as a writer were Thomas Cadell the elder, Thomas Cadell the younger, and William Davies. Unfortunately she also struggled with disputes from "various booksellers over copyright, a printer's competence, or the quality of an engraving for an illustration. She would argue that the time was ripe for a second edition of a novel."

Smith "clung to her own sense of herself as a gentlewoman of integrity". The negative sides that Smith claimed to have experienced during the publication process were perceived as self-pity by many publishers of her time, affecting her relationship and reputation with them. Smith's push to be taken seriously and how she emerges as an essential figure of the "Age of Sensibility" is observed in her powerful use of vulnerability. Antje Blank of The Literary Encyclopedia states, "Few exploited fiction's potential of self-representation with such determination as Smith." Her work is defined as "squarely in the cult of sensibility: she believed in the virtue of kindness, in generosity to those less fortunate, and in the cultivation of the finer feelings of sympathy and tenderness for those who suffered needlessly."

Ultimately, "Smith's autobiographical incursions" bridge the old and the new, "older poetic forms and an emerging Romantic voice." Smith was a skillful satirist and political commentator on the condition of England, and this is, I think, the most interesting aspect of her fiction and the one that had most influence on later writers." Oneț felt that Smith's work "rejected an identity defined exclusively by emotionality, matrimony, the family unit, and female sexuality." Overall Smith's career in writing was rejoiced, well perceived and popular until her later years of living. "Smith deserves to be read not simply as a writer whose work demonstrates changes in taste, but as one of the primary voices of her time and a worthy contemporary of the male romantic poets."

Smith's novels reappeared at the end of the 20th century, when critics "interested in the period's women poets and prose writers, the Gothic novel, the historical novel, the social problem novel, and post-colonial studies" argued for her significance as a writer. They concluded that she helped to revitalise the English sonnet, a view found in Coleridge and others. Scott wrote that she "preserves in her landscapes the truth and precision of a painter" and poet. Barbauld claimed that Smith was the first to include sustained natural description in novels. In 2008, Smith's complete prose became available to the general public. The edition contains all her novels, the children's stories and rural walks.

== Selected works ==
=== Poetry ===
- Elegiac Sonnets (1784)
  - "On Being Cautioned Against Walking on an Headland" (1797)
- The Emigrants (1793)
- Beachy Head and Other Poems (1807)

=== Novels ===
- Emmeline; or The Orphan of the Castle (1788)
- Ethelinde; or the Recluse of the Lake (1789)
- Celestina (1791)
- Desmond (1792)
- The Old Manor House (1793)
- The Wanderings of Warwick (1794)
- The Banished Man (1794)
- Montalbert (1795)
- Marchmont (1796)
- The Young Philosopher (1798)
- Letters of a Solitary Wanderer (1800, 1802)

=== Educational works ===
- Rural Walks (1795)
- Rambles Farther (1796)
- Minor Morals (1798)
- Conversations Introducing Poetry (1804)

== Bibliography ==
- Abrams, Meyer Howard; Greenblatt, Stephen; Christ, Carol T; David, Alfred; Lewalski, Barbara K; Lipking, Lawrence; Logan, George M; Lynch, Deidre Shauna; Maus, Katharine Eisaman; Noggle, James; Ramazani, Jahan; Robson, Catherine; Simpson, James; Stallworthy, Jon; Stillinger, Jack, eds. (2012). The Norton Anthology of English Literature (9th ed.). Norton. ISBN 978-0393912487.
- Bennet, John (Jan 1792). Letters to a young Lady. Vol. 11. Philadelphia: American Museum.
- Blank, Antje (2003). "Charlotte Smith". In Todd, Janet; Cook, Daniel; Robinson, Daniel (eds.). The Literary Encyclopedia. Vol. 1.2.1.06: English Writing and Culture of the Romantic Period, 1789–1837. Archived from the original on 13 Oct 2003.
- Clemit, Pamela; Scott, Brad (2020). "Botanical Networking: Four Holograph Letters from Charlotte Smith to James Edward Smith". Romanticism. 26 (1). Edinburgh University Press: 1–12. doi:10.3366/rom.2020.0443.
- Craciun, Adriana (2005). British Women Writers and the French Revolution – Citizens of the World. Palgrave Studies in the Enlightenment, Romanticism and Cultures of Print. Palgrave Macmillan. ISBN 978-1403902351.
- Curran, Stuart (1993). The Poems of Charlotte Smith. Women Writers in English 1350–1850. OUP. ISBN 978-0195083583.
- Curran, Stuart, ed. (2005). The Works of Charlotte Smith (14 vols). Vol. Part I: vols 1–5. Volume Editors: Adriana Craciun, Stuart Curran, Kate Davies, Elizabeth Dolan, Ina Ferris, Michael Gamer, M O Grenby, Harriet Guest, Jacqueline Labbe, D L Macdonald, A A Markley, Judith Pascoe, Judith Stanton & Kristina Straub. Pickering & Chatto / Routledge. ISBN 978-1851967896.
- Dorset, Catherine; Scott, Walter (1827). "Charlotte Smith". Miscellaneous Prose Works. Vol. IV Biographical Memoirs. Cadell. pp. 3–47.
- Fry, Carrol Lee (1996). Charlotte Smith. Twayne's English authors series. Vol. 528. Twayne. ISBN 978-0805770469.
- Goodman, Kevis (Fall 2014). "Conjectures on Beachy Head: Charlotte Smith's Geological Poetics and the Ground of the Present". ELH. 81 (3). JHUP: 983–1006. doi:10.1353/elh.2014.0033. S2CID 161287287.
- Hart, Monica Smith (2010). "Charlotte Smith's Exilic Persona". Partial Answers: Journal of Literature and the History of Ideas. 8 (2). JHUP: 305–323. doi:10.1353/pan.0.0183. S2CID 144555993.
- Hoeveler, Diane Long (1998). Gothic Feminism: The Professionalization of Gender from Charlotte Smith to the Brontës. Penn State UP. ISBN 978-0271033617.
- Keane, Angela (2001). Women Writers and the English Nation in the 1790s: Romantic Belongings. Cambridge Studies in Romanticism. Vol. 44. CUP. ISBN 978-0521773423.
- Kelley, Theresa M (2004). "Romantic Histories: Charlotte Smith and Beachy Head". Nineteenth-Century Literature. 59 (3). U California P: 281–314. doi:10.1525/ncl.2004.59.3.281.
- Kelley, Theresa M (2012). Clandestine Marriage: Botany and Romantic Culture. JHUP. ISBN 978-1421407609.
- Klekar, Cynthia (2007). "The Obligations of Form: Social Practice in Charlotte Smith's Emmeline". Philological Quarterly. 86 (3). Iowa UP: 269–289. Archived from the original on 16 Oct 2015 – via Questia.
- Kunitz, Stanley Jasspon; Haycraft, Howard, eds. (1952). British Authors Before 1800: A Biographical Dictionary. Wilson. ISBN 978-0824200060.
- Labbe, Jacqueline M, ed. (2002). The Old Manor House. Charlotte Smith. Broadview. ISBN 978-1551112138.
- Labbe, Jacqueline M (2003). Charlotte Smith: Romanticism, Poetry, and the Culture of Gender. Manchester UP. ISBN 978-0719060045.
- Labbe, Jacqueline M, ed. (2008). Charlotte Smith in British Romanticism. The Enlightenment World. Vol. 5. Routledge. ISBN 978-1851969456.
- Oneț, Alina-Elena (2015). "The Spirit of the Age: The Imaginary of Gender and Romance in Charlotte Turner Smith". Revista Transilvania (5): 71–74.
- Pascoe, Judith (1994). "Female Botanists and the Poetry of Charlotte Smith". In Wilson, Carol Shiner; Haefner, Joel (eds.). Re-Visioning Romanticism: British Women Writers, 1776–1837. Pennsylvania UP. pp. 193–209. ISBN 978-0812214215.
- Pascoe, Judith (1997). Romantic Theatricality: Gender, Poetry, and Spectatorship. Cornell UP. ISBN 978-0801433047.
- Peacock, Markham Lovick (1950). The critical opinions of William Wordsworth (Thesis). JHUP. p. 351., later published as Peacock, Markham Lovick (1969). The Critical Opinions of William Wordsworth. Octagon Books. ISBN 978-0-374-96327-9.
- Pinch, Adela (1997). Strange Fits of Passion: Epistemologies of Emotion, Hume to Austen. Stanford UP. ISBN 978-0804725484.
- Radcliffe, David Hill (ed.). Commentary: William Wordsworth on Charlotte Smith (1835). English Poetry 1579–1830.
- Roberts, Bethan (2019). Charlotte Smith and the Sonnet Form: Place and Tradition in the Late Eighteenth Century. Liverpool: Liverpool University Press. ISBN 978-1-78962-017-7.
- Scarth, Kate (2014). "Elite Metropolitan Culture, Women, and Greater London in Charlotte Smith's Emmeline and Celestina". European Romantic Review. 25 (5). Taylor and Francis: 629–648. doi:10.1080/10509585.2014.938230. S2CID 145513731.
- Smith, Charlotte (1804a). Conversations Introducing Poetry: chiefly on subjects of Natural Science. For the use of Children and Young Persons (PDF). Vol. I. Johnson, St Paul's Churchyard, London. Stanford 195269.
- Smith, Charlotte (1804b). Conversations Introducing Poetry: chiefly on subjects of Natural Science. For the use of Children and Young Persons (PDF). Vol. II. Johnson, St Paul's Churchyard, London. Stanford 195269.
- Sodeman, Melissa (2014). Sentimental Memorials: Women and the Novel in Literary History. Stanford UP. ISBN 978-0804791328.
- Stanton, Judith Phillips, ed. (2003). The Collected Letters of Charlotte Smith (PDF). Indiana UP. Archived from the original (PDF) on 23 Nov 2020.
- Zimmerman, Sarah M (2007). Smith [née Turner], Charlotte. OUP. doi:10.1093/ref:odnb/25790. (Subscription, Wikipedia Library access or UK public library membership required.)
