= The Emigrants (poem) =

1793 poem by Charlotte Smith

- by Charlotte Smith
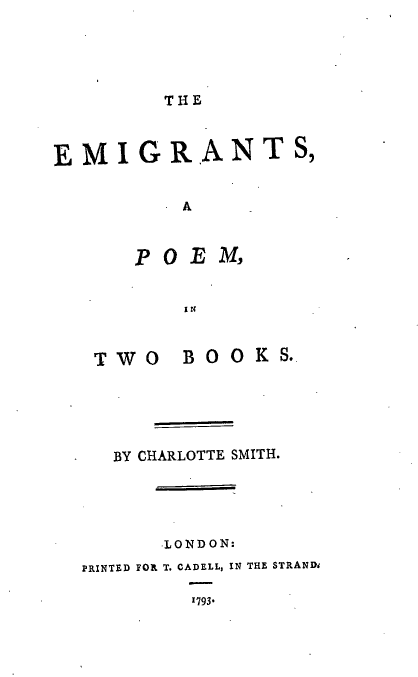
- Title page of the first edition
- Form: blank verse
- Publisher: T. Cadell
- Publication date: 1793

The Emigrants is a narrative blank verse poem by Charlotte Smith first published in 1793.

== Background ==
When she wrote The Emigrants, Smith was a successful poet and novelist whose literary career had just taken a more political turn. She was best known for her melancholy reflections on nature in Elegiac Sonnets, which published a sixth edition expanded with new poems in 1792. She had also achieved financial success publishing the sentimental and Gothic novels Emmeline (1788), Ethelinde (1789), and Celestina (1791), before publishing the controversially political novel Desmond in the summer of 1792. In Desmond, Smith expressed strong pro-revolutionary ideals which became less acceptable to the British public as events in France turned violent. The Emigrants mutes some of Smith's revolutionary fervor while still expressing sympathy with French revolutionary ideals and with the French émigrés who fled France for England. French émigrés were a common subject in British literature around the Revolution. Conservative writers depicted émigrés sentimentally as virtuous, suffering aristocrats persecuted by cruel monarchists, presenting Britain as an idealized nation of liberty. Progressive writers, including Smith, depicted the poverty and isolation of émigrés in Britain to critique the xenophobia of laws like the Aliens Act, the inequality of British society generally, and the danger of nationalism itself.

The two books of the poem are set in November 1792 and April 1793. In November 1792, recent events included the storming of the Tuileries Palace and the September Massacres, reflecting a newly violent anti-monarchist turn led by Maximilien Robespierre. Priests who had refused to support the Civil Constitution of the Clergy had been declared traitors. They, and many others, fled France for other countries for safety; these emigrants' property was confiscated, and any who returned were subject to the death penalty. In April 1793, violence had escalated further with the execution of Louis XVI in January and England's declaration of war against France in February. Smith completed the poem in May 1793. The dedication is dated May 10, 1792, written from Brighthelmstone.

== Synopsis ==
Book I is set "on the Cliffs to the Eastward of the Town of Brighthelmstone in Sussex," on "a Morning in November, 1792." The sun rises over the sea, prompting the poem's speaker to regret the end of nighttime's dreams. The speaker often wishes to live in seclusion to forget her sorrows, and the sorrows of others. A group of emigrants approach, whose misery she pities. She describes a monk, a cardinal, an abbé, and a parochial priest who have been exiled from France for their religious beliefs. She then describes a mother who sits at the base of a cliff with her children, whose innocence allows them to enjoy the beach while their mother mourns their separation from France. The woman's aristocratic husband arrives to interrupt her reverie, and the poem's speaker reflects that men in both France and England fail to understand that "worth alone is true Nobility," overvaluing titles and wealth. The poem's speaker pities the suffering and isolation of the émigrés. The poem then addresses "Fortune's worthless favourites! / Who feed on England's vitals," namely, British politicians, who rise to new and unmerited wealth through exploitation, and who should learn from the émigrés a lesson that oppression will not be endured indefinitely. The book closes with a call for Britain to live up to its ideals through generosity, rather than the supposed glory of war.

Book II is set "on an Eminence on one of those Downs, which afford to the South a View of the Sea; to the North of the Weald of Sussex," on "an Afternoon in April, 1793," four months after Book I and farther inland. The arrival of spring tempts the poem's speaker with hopeful feelings, but her years of personal sorrow weigh too heavily on her, as does her horror at recent violence. She regrets that Louis XVI has been beheaded, and that the ideals of liberty have been overwhelmed by "Fraud and Anarchy," hindering social reform. She expresses pity and hope for the child Louis XVII, whose unhappiness she imagines as a contrast with a happy shepherd child. She also expresses pity for Marie Antoinette, saying she has felt the same pain in her own anxiety for her children. The poem's speaker rejects the idea that rural simplicity is the key to a happy life, describing the suffering of poverty. She takes some comfort from the fact that Britain is safe from war, and relates the chilling experiences of violence that émigrés describe in France. She describes a mother fleeing with a child in her arms, both of whom die in a thunderstorm. She then describes an aristocratic man who returns to his castle to find it empty except for the bodies of his murdered family, and who goes mad. These vignettes support a critique of war and "the closet murderers, whom we style / Wise Politicians" responsible for war. The poem's speaker reflects on her personal unhappiness. The book closes with a prayer to God: "May lovely Freedom, in her genuine charms, / Aided by stern but equal Justice, drive / From the ensanguin'd earth the hell-born fiends / Of Pride, Oppression, Avarice, and Revenge, / That ruin what thy mercy made so fair!"

== Influences ==
Smith linked the poem to William Cowper's blank verse poem The Task (1785), both in the preface to the work and in her correspondence with publishers. In 1792, she wrote to the bookseller J. Dodsley for advice on publishing The Emigrants, saying it is written "in the way of the Task--only of course inferior to it" and saying that the final draft of the poem "will be corrected by the very first of our present Poets--Cowper." The dedication, addressed to Cowper, says The Emigrants is "far from aspiring to be considered as an imitation of your inimitable Poem, The Task" but that reading The Task "almost incessantly from its first publication" inspired Smith to try long blank verse as a poetic form for herself.
