= The Banished Man =

1794 novel by Charlotte Smith

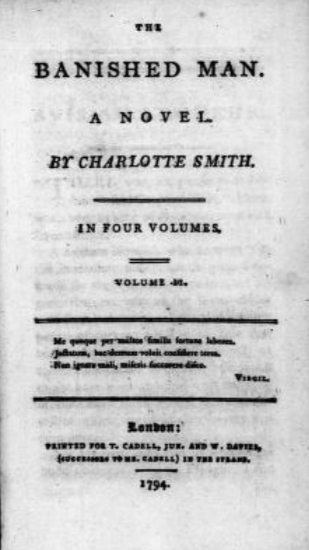
- Title page for The Banished Man (1794)
- Author: Charlotte Smith
- Publisher: T. Cadell, Jun. and W. Davies
- Publication date: 1794

The Banished Man is a novel by Charlotte Smith, first published in 1794.

The novel has a more ambiguous relationship to the Gothic genre than Smith's earlier novels, which were often both Gothic and sentimental. Unlike a typical Gothic novel, The Banished Man is not set in the past and depicts entirely non-supernatural events. The second volume begins with an essay by Smith, "Avis au Lecteur", describing her intentional focus on realism and recent events. However, the narrative uses Gothic plot elements of castles, storms, and vulnerable women needing rescue, and it creates a Gothic aesthetic of suspense and horror. As such, it has been compared to the novels Things as They Are, or, The Adventures of Caleb Williams (1794) by William Godwin and Maria: or, The Wrongs of Woman (1798) by Mary Wollstonecraft, both of which present everyday life in the 1790s as naturally Gothic.

The Banished Man was Smith's first novel to follow her politically radical Desmond (1792), which had garnered negative reactions to its endorsement of revolutionary ideals. In comparison, The Banished Man was seen as a retraction of those views.
