= Joseph Cooper Walker =

Irish antiquarian and writer (1762–1810)

Joseph Cooper Walker (c.1762–1810) was an Irish antiquarian and writer.

== Life ==
Walker was born in Dublin and educated under Thomas Ball. An invalid with acute asthma, in his earlier years he travelled a great deal for his health, and for many years lived in Italy. Walker's main work is Historical Memoirs of the Irish Bards (1786), an important source for, among others, the life of the Irish harper Turlough Carolan. Lesa Ní Mhunghaile is of the view that the translations of Irish poems in this publication were influenced by Ossian, but also were considered by the author to improve on the originals. Walker's Historical Essay on the Dress of the Ancient and Modern Irish (1788) was also concerned with the recovery of the Irish past. Walker was aware of the tension between national revival and the bardic note of loss.

Walker was one of the original members of the Royal Irish Academy and contributed papers to its Transactions. Besides his more important writings (see below) he also wrote "Anecdotes on Chess in Ireland", a paper contributed to Charles Vallancey's Collectanea de Rebus Hibernicis. He also left works in manuscript, including a journal of his travels and materials for Lives of the Painters, Sculptors, and Engravers of Ireland. Francis Hardy, biographer of the Earl of Charlemont, undertook a biography of Walker, finished in 1812, but then suppressed by the family. On Hardy's death the materials were handed to Edward Berwick, who does not seem to have completed the work. Many of Walker's letters are printed in John Nichols's Literary Illustrations.

After his time in Italy, Walker settled down in a house called St. Valerie, Bray, County Wicklow, with art treasures and an extensive library. Here he passed the rest of his life. He died on 12 April 1810 in Enniskerry, County Wicklow, and was buried on 14 April in St Mary's Churchyard, Dublin.

== Works ==
- Historical Memoirs of the Irish Bards (London: T. Payne & Son, and Dublin: Luke White, 1786); new edition, Dublin: J. Christie, 1818.
- Historical Essay on the Dress of the Ancient and Modern Irish, to which is subjoined a Memoir on the Armour and Weapons of the Irish (Dublin, 1788); new edition, London, 1818.
- Historical Memoir on Italian Tragedy (London: E. Harding, 1799)
- Historical and Critical Essay on the Revival of the Drama in Italy (Edinburgh, 1805)

Walker's Memoirs of Alessandro Tassoni were published posthumously in 1815, with a preface by his brother, Samuel Walker. It contains poems to Walker's memory by Eyles Irwin, Henry Boyd, William Hayley, and Robert Anderson.
