= Énrí Ó Muirgheasa =

Irish civil servant, folklore collector and writer

- Born: Henry Morris; 14 January 1874; Cashlan East, Donaghmoyne, County Monaghan, Ireland
- Died: 13 August 1945 (aged 71); Strabane, County Tyrone
- Education: St Patrick's College, Dublin
- Occupations: Schoolteacher; folklorist; historian; writer
- Spouses: Eibhlín Ní Raghallaigh (m. 1906; died 1908); Máire Woods (m. 1912)
- Children: Colm Ó Muirgheasa (b. 1907; died 1907)
- Parents: Mary Ward (mother); Luke Ward (father)
- Writing career
- Pen name: Feargus Mac Róigh; Gaedilig
- Period: Gaelic revival
- Movement: Gaelic League
- Website: enri.ie

Énrí Ó Muirgheasa (also spelled Ua Muirgheasa, Ó Muireasa, and Ó Muiríosa; Henry Morris) (14 January 1874 – 13 August 1945), was an Irish civil servant, Irish language scholar, folklore collector, historian and writer.

== Early life and family ==
Ó Muirgheasa was born in Cashlan East, Lisdoonan, Donaghmoyne, County Monaghan on 14 January 1874. He was a son of Lúcas Ó Muirgheasa, a farmer, and Máire Nic Ward. He attended Lisdoonan school but learned to read and write Irish from his granduncle, Proinsias Ó Conghaile.

Ó Muirgheasa married harpist and fellow teacher, Eibhlín Ní Raghallaigh (Helen O'Reilley) of Dundalk in 1906. Their son, Colum, was born and died in 1907. Eibhlín died in 1908. In 1912, he remarried to Máire Woods from County Galway. Ó Muirgheasa died on 13 August 1945 in Strabane.

== Career ==
He was appointed monitor at Lisdoonan school in 1888, where he established the first Monaghan branch of the Gaelic League. Ó Muirgheasa graduated as a teacher from St. Patrick's College, Drumcondra, in 1900, obtaining a teaching post at St. Malachy's, Dundalk, in 1901, where he was one of the founders of the Louth Historical and Archaeological Society in 1903. Ó Muirgheasa moved to Strabane, County Tyrone in 1907, where he organised the teaching of Irish in schools. He moved to Derry in 1912, and then became a school inspector in Skerries. In 1923, he was appointed a divisional inspector in Sligo, becoming deputy chief inspector in 1932.

His writings were published widely in both journals and newspapers.

== Bibliography ==
Title	Year	Publisher
Greann na Gaedhilge	1899-1914	Clódhanna Teoranta, Connradh na Gaedhilge
Seanfhocla Uladh	1907	Connradh na Gaedhilge
Ceithearnach Ui Dhomhnaill	1912	Connradh na Gaedhilge
Céad de Cheoltaibh Uladh	1915	McGill
Céad de Cheoltaibh Uladh	1993 (ed. Br. Thomas Beausang)	Conradh na Gaeilge
Abhráin Airt Mhic Chubhthaigh, agus abhráin eile	1916	M. H. Gill & Son
Abhráin Airt Mhic Chubhthaigh, agus abhráin eile	1926	Preas Dhún Dealgan
Oíche áirneáil i dTír Chonaill	1924	Preas Dhún Dealgan
Amhrán na Midhe	1933	
Amhrán na Midhe	2015 (ed. Lesa Ní Mhunghaile)	Louth Archeological Society
Dhá Chéad de Cheoltaibh Uladh	1934	Oifig Díolta Foillseachán Rialtais
Dhá Chéad de Cheoltaibh Uladh	1974 (facsimile)	Clóchualacht Chathail
Dhá Chéad de Cheoltaibh Uladh	2026 (ed. Robbi McMillen)	Cló Seoighe
Dánta Diadha Uladh	1936	Muinntir Chathail / Oifig Díolta Foillseacháin Rialtais
