= Montalbert (novel) =

1795 novel

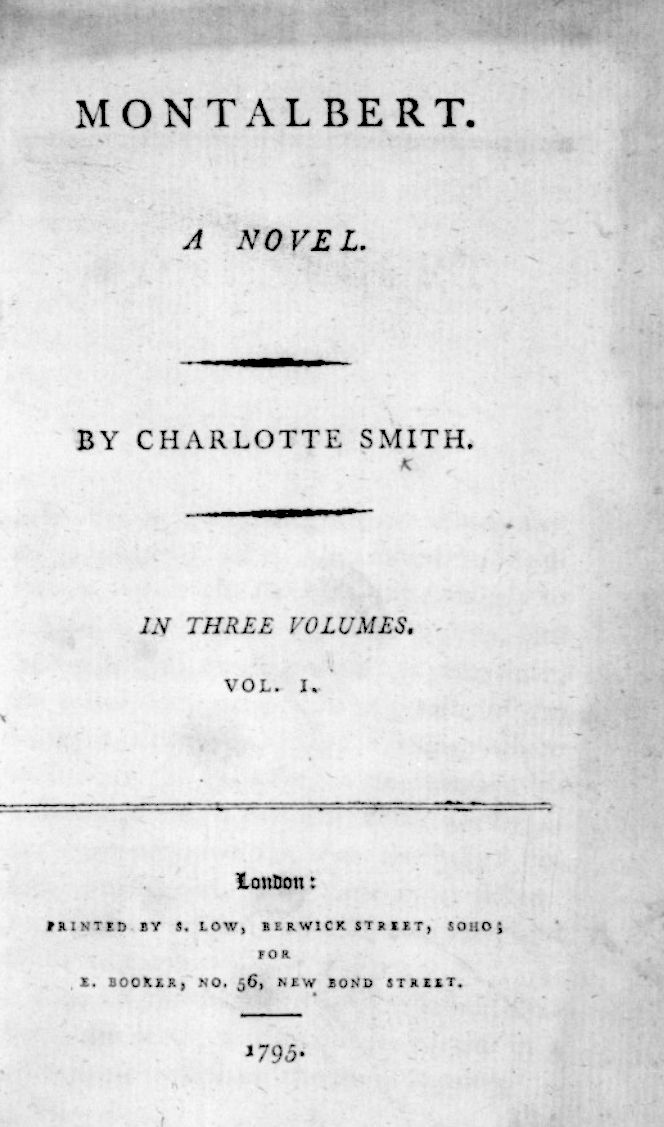
- Author: Charlotte Smith
- Genre: Gothic fiction
- Publication date: 1795

Montalbert (1795) is a novel by Charlotte Smith. The story is set in England and Italy in 1782 and 1783, with the 1783 Calabrian earthquakes playing a role in the narrative. The novel responds to Ann Radcliffe's famous Gothic novel A Sicilian Romance (1790), especially through its plot of a disenfranchised young woman seeking her lost mother.

== Synopsis ==
Chronologically, the events of the novel begin with Rosalie Montalbert, who belongs to the English Catholic gentry. She falls in love with Ormsby, an impoverished Irishman and a distant relative; they have an affair. Ormsby disappears, apparently murdered by Rosalie's father (actually compelled by him to move to India), and Rosalie marries a man she does not love but whom her father approves of. She gives birth to an illegitimate daughter, also named Rosalie, whom she secretly gives to her Protestant friend Mrs. Lessington to raise.

Rosalie Lessington repeats her mother's misfortunes through an illicit affair with Harry Montalbert, who is unbeknownst to her a distant relation. They elope, but Montalbert refuses to tell his family, leaving Rosalie (the younger) alone with an infant in Messina while he visits his mother. Rosalie and the baby are endangered when an earthquake destroys their villa. When Montalbert returns to Messina, rather than seeking them he pursues revenge on a man whom he falsely suspects of conducting an affair with Rosalie. When Rosalie and Montalbert eventually reunite in England, he has her baby taken away because he considers her an adulteress, and she goes mad. Eventually, they reconcile for a happy ending.
