= Rural Walks =

1795 book by Charlotte Smith

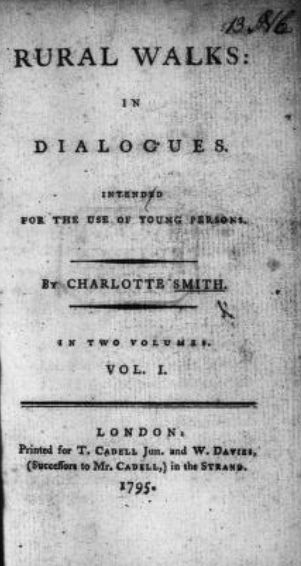
- Title page for Rural Walks In Dialogues (1795)
- Author: Charlotte Turner Smith
- Publication date: 1795

Rural Walks is an early work of children's literature by Charlotte Turner Smith, first published in 1795. The book was intended to introduce children to both poetry and natural history, partly inspired by Anna Laetitia Barbaulds' Evenings at Home (1792–1796). Like her other educational works for children, it was primarily intended for an audience of girls, since boys would have access to formal schooling which made such books less necessary for them.

== Composition ==
Smith was initially successful as a poet and then a novelist, writing sentimental and Gothic novels, but sales declined as her pro-revolutionary political opinions made her less popular. In her later years, she began writing educational works, even though publishers paid less for them, because they were less risky. Rural Walks was her first educational book, written in part to earn money for the medical care of one of her daughters, who was pregnant and ill. Smith suggested the idea of the book to her publisher, William Davies, in a letter on 2 October 1794. She had been considering writing an educational book since July 1794, and decided on the content of Rural Walks based on her difficulty finding books for her youngest daughter, who was twelve.

== Contents ==
The book is framed around the story of Mrs. Woodfield and her teenage niece Caroline Cecil. Caroline has been spoiled by her upbringing in London, but when her mother dies she is sent to the countryside to be taken care of by her father's sister, Mrs. Woodfield. Mrs. Woodfield is an impoverished widow who has been seen as a stand-in for Smith herself. The book unfolds in the form of conversations between Mrs. Woodfield, her two daughters, and Caroline, as they go for walks in the countryside. Over the course of the book, Mrs. Woodfield teaches Caroline "sympathy for the unfortunate and an appreciation of nature."
