= The Old Manor House =

1793 novel by Charlotte Smith

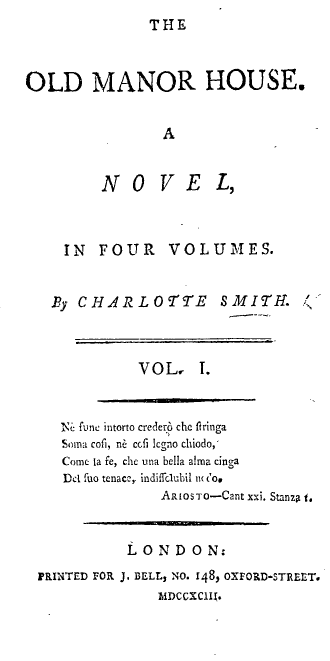
- Title page of the first edition
- Author: Charlotte Smith
- Publication date: 1793

The Old Manor House is a novel by Charlotte Smith, first published in 1793. The plot tells the love story of a gentleman, Orlando Somerive, and his aunt's servant, Monimia Morysine. The novel blends gothic, sentimental, and political narrative techniques to present a "polemical romance," depicting the American revolution of the 1770s to comment on the ongoing French revolution of the 1790s. Smith particularly critiqued the injustices of war and property laws. The Old Manor House is sometimes considered the best of Charlotte Smith's ten novels, drawing particular praise for its deep characterization, engaging plot, and descriptions of nature.

Smith composed the novel between August 1792 and January 1793, a period when the French Revolution was growing more violent. Smith was sympathetic to the political goals of the French revolutionaries. Her previous novel, Desmond (1792), was explicitly political in its depiction of contemporary events, and received strong criticism for its pro-French ideas. As anti-French sentiment grew even stronger in England, Smith grew less direct about her political ideas; The Old Manor House expresses similar ideals as Smith's earlier work, but filtered through her country's recent history rather than current events.
