= Nicholas Hankey Smith =

British diplomat (1771–1837)

Nicholas Hankey Smith (1771–1837) was a son of Benjamin and Charlotte Smith, the former a rich West Indian merchant, the latter a celebrated writer. He was a Persian Ambassador and British Resident in the Persian Gulf commanding the Presidencies of Bushire, Baghdad and Bussoia. He married Anni Petroose, daughter of Khan Petroose, a Persian Minister and grand niece to the late King Fullah Alli Shah.
