= Marchmont (novel) =

1796 novel by Charlotte Turner Smith

Marchmont is Charlotte Smith's ninth novel, and follows the story of her heroine, Althea Dacres, and the Marchmont family. It was published in August 1796.

== Plot ==
=== Volume 1 ===
==== Chapter 1 ====
Althea Dacres and her aunt Mrs. Trevyllian leave their home in the west of England to visit Sir Audley, Althea's father, at his home in London. From there they travel into Hertfordshire to visit a Mrs. Polwarth, a friend of Mrs. Trevyllian's, only to discover that she is gravely ill. Mrs. Trevyllian stays to nurse her friend, and Althea returns to London to stay at her father's house, where she receives a cold reception from Lady Dacres and especially from her servant, Morris.

== Characters ==
=== Major characters ===
- Althea Dacres – Althea is the protagonist of the novel. She is the daughter of Sir Audley by his first wife and was raised by her aunt, Mrs. Trevyllian.
- Mrs. Anne Trevyllian – Mrs. Trevyllian is Althea Dacres's maternal aunt and her guardian.
- Mrs. Dacres (née Trevyllian) – Althea's mother's first name is unknown. She is the fourth daughter of the Trevyllian family. She died two years after her marriage to Mr. Dacres, when Althea was 10 months old. (later Sir Audley)
- Sir Audley – Sir Audley is Althea's father, the younger brother of an established family. He worked in the army when he and Althea's mother were first married. After his first wife dies, he leaves the army and marries the wealthy younger daughter of a wealthy tradesman. Part of their marriage settlement included purchasing a baronetcy, making him Sir Audley and his wife Lady Dacres.
- Lady Dacres – The younger daughter of a wealthy tradesman and the second wife of Sir Audley (Mr. Dacres)
- Mr. Mohun – An attorney and associate of Sir Audley who schemes to marry Althea.
- Edmund Marchmont – The only son of the Marchmont family, and the lover of Althea.
- Mr. Vampyre – An attorney who pursues Edmund Marchmont to collect the debt he inherits from his father.

=== Minor characters ===
- Sir Armyn Marchmont (deceased)
- Caroline Dacres – The eldest daughter of Sir Audley and Lady Dacres
- Mr. Dacres – the son of Sir Audley and Lady Dacres
- Mrs. Polwarth – A friend of Mrs. Trevyllian, from whom she catches her fatal illness
- Morris – Lady Dacres' servant

== Major themes ==
- The law
  - Shakespeare, Shylock, and Usury
- The Gothic

=== Publication history ===
Marchmont was first printed in four volumes and sold by the London publisher Sampson Low in 1796. Between 2005 and 2007, Pickering & Chatto published a 14-volume edition of Smith's collected work, The Works of Charlotte Smith, with Stuart Curran as General Editor. An edition was published in 2017 by Whitlock Publishing, edited and with an introduction by Logan E. Gee.

== Reception ==
Fletcher writes Marchmont was "in general very well received and represented in columes of extracts, a good indicator of popularity, more often than other novels of that year."

For example, one reviewer writes:

The present novel is certainly spun out in the beginning, and wound up too hastily at the conclusion; still the design of showing the misery, which unprincipled men of the law may bring on the innocent, is well imagined.

There were many other contemporary reviews, reflecting similar sentiments, including reviews in Monthly Review, The Monthly Visitor and Entertaining Pocket Companion, and The Critical Review.
