= Lesa Ní Mhunghaile =

Irish academic working in the area of the Irish language

Lesa Ní Mhunghaile, Irish academic and scholar.

A native of the Breac-Ghaeltach in County Meath, Ní Mhunghaile was educated at the National University of Ireland, Galway, and Rheinische Friedrich-Wilhelms-Universität, Bonn, Germany. She worked in TG4 (1996-2001), and was a post-doctoral research fellow at the Moore Institute, NUI, Galway (2001-2004), working on the Ascendancy and the Gaelic World Project. Between 2005 and 2013 she lectured in Irish at Mary Immaculate College, University of Limerick, returning to Galway to lecture since September 2013.

== Selected bibliography ==
- "Carolan’s Verse" in Amhráin Chearbhalláin/The Poems of Carolan: Reassessments, London, Irish Texts Society, 2007
- Charlotte Brooke's Reliques of Irish Poetry, Dublin, Irish Manuscripts Commission, 2009
- "The Irish language in County Meath, 1700-1900" in Meath. History and Society: Interdisciplinary essays on the History of an Irish County, Dublin, 2015.
- Amhráin na Midhe le hÉnrí Ó Muirgheasa, Navan, Meath Archaeological and Historical Society, 2015
