= Massinger =

Massinger is a surname. Notable people with the surname include:

- Philip Massinger (1583–1640), English dramatist
- William Massinger (1514/15–1593/94), English politician
