= Thomas Cadell (publisher) =

English bookseller and publisher

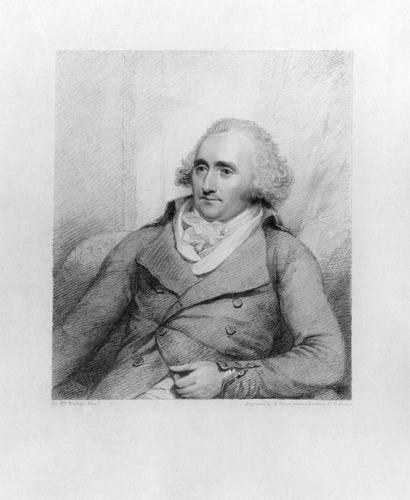
Thomas Cadell

Thomas Cadell (1742–1802), often referred to as Thomas Cadell the elder, was a successful 18th-century English bookseller who published works by some of the most famous writers of the 18th century.

The business was continued by his son, Thomas Cadell (1773–1836), often referred to as Thomas Cadell the younger, who went into business with William Davies as Cadell & Davies until Davies death in 1819. Cadell continued in business until his own death in 1836.

== History ==
Thomas Cadell was born in Bristol to William and Mary Cadell and baptized on 12 November 1742. On 7 March 1758, Cadell's father apprenticed him for a fee of £105 to London bookseller and publisher Andrew Millar. Cadell became Millar's partner in April 1765, having just finished his seven-year apprenticeship, and took over the business with the help of Millar's assistant, Robert Lawless, upon Millar's death in 1768. Now a successful bookseller, Cadell married the daughter of Reverend Thomas Jones on 1 April 1769.

Cadell ran his business out of 141 Strand for over 25 years, sometimes partnering with William Strahan and later Andrew Strahan. He published works by notable authors, whom he paid well. For example, Cadell and Strahan published Edward Gibbon’s Decline and Fall of the Roman Empire (1776–88), Henry Mackenzie’s The Man of Feeling (1771) and the poetry of Robert Burns. Cadell wrote to Gibbon in 1787: “I had rather risk my fortune with a few such Authors as Mr Gibbon, Dr Robertson, D Hume … than be the publisher of a hundred insipid publications”. He also published works by the jurist William Blackstone, the philosopher David Hume, the author and critic Samuel Johnson, the philosopher and economist Adam Smith, the novelist Tobias Smollett, the novelist Frances Burney, the poet and French Revolution supporter Helen Maria Williams, the historian Catharine Macaulay, and the moralist Hannah More. He also published the novels of Charlotte Smith until her works became too radical, refusing to publish Desmond in 1792.

Cadell had a strong relationship with Samuel Johnson. Cadell was part of the group of booksellers who convinced the famous critic to write Lives of the Most Eminent English Poets (1779–81). He also published Johnson's political tracts of the 1770s and, together with Strahan, his A Journey to the Western Islands of Scotland (1775). After Johnson died, Cadell published Hester Thrale Piozzi's Letters and Anecdotes about Johnson.

Cadell was well liked by other booksellers and he helped establish the booksellers’ dining club which met each month at the Shakespeare tavern in Wych Street. Together, they prosecuted infringements on their copyrights from Scottish and Irish printers.

In January 1786, Cadell's wife died. The couple had two children. His daughter married Dr. Charles Lucas Eldridge, chaplain to George III. His son, Thomas Cadell the younger, took over the family business when his father retired in 1793.

After his retirement, Cadell served on the boards of several philanthropic institutions, such as the Foundling Hospital. In March 1798, he was elected alderman of Walbrook and served as sheriff from 1800 to 1801. He was also master of the Stationers’ Company from 1798 to 1799 and stock-keeper in 1800.

Cadell died at his home on 27 December 1802 from an asthma attack.

== Bibliography ==
Dille, Catherine. “Thomas Cadell, the elder (1742-1802)”. Oxford Dictionary of National Biography. Oxford University Press. January 2008. Retrieved 16 February 2009.
