= The Literary Encyclopedia =

Online reference work

- Website type: reference work
- Available in: English
- Owner: The Literary Dictionary Company Limited
- Website: www.litencyc.com
- Launched: 2000; 26 years ago
- ISSN: 1747-678X

The Literary Encyclopedia is an online reference work first published in October 2000. It was founded as an innovative project, designed to bring the benefits of information technology to what at the time was still a largely conservative literary field. From its inception it was developed as a not-for-profit publication to ensure that contributors are properly rewarded for the time and knowledge they invest – as such, its authors and editors are also shareholders in the Literary Dictionary Company.

The Literary Encyclopedia offers both freely available content and content and services for subscribers (individual and institutional, consisting mainly of higher education institutions and higher level secondary schools). Articles are solicited by invitation from specialist scholars, then refereed and approved by subject editors, which makes the LE both authoritative and reliable. It contains general profiles of literary writers, but also of major cultural, historical and scientific figures; articles on individual works of literature from all over the world (often containing succinct critical commentary and sections on critical reception); entries on hundreds of literary terms, concepts and movements, as well as extended essays on topics of historical and cultural importance.

The Literary Encyclopedia offers free access, upon request, to its entire database to all educational institutions in countries where the GDP is below the world average. It also offers a number of research grants to young and emerging scholars in its subscribing institutions, funded by royalties donated by the publication's contributors and editors.

The encyclopedia's founding editors were Robert Clark (University of East Anglia), Emory Elliott (University of California at Riverside) and Janet Todd (University of Cambridge), and its current editorial board numbers over 100 distinguished scholars from higher education institutions all over the world. Its present editor is Grace Moore (University of Otago) and Robert Clark remains the publisher.

Written and owned by a global network of scholars and researchers, The Literary Encyclopedia is an ongoing project. So far, it has published over 9500 articles, comprising more than 20 million words, on a wide range of authors, works and topics in world literature, from the classical to the postcolonial. It continues to publish an average of 20-40 new articles every month, and subscribers benefit from considerable cross-referencing possibilities to its articles under the form of lists of recommended critical bibliographies, course-specific bookshelves, and clusters of related articles.

The Literary Encyclopedia also runs a variety of awards and prizes, such as the annual Literary Encyclopedia Book Prize, which rewards scholarly contributions to our understanding of literature originally in the English language and in other languages.

== See also ==
- List of online encyclopedias
