= Desmond (novel) =

Creative work by Charlotte Turner Smith

- Author: Charlotte Smith
- Language: English
- Genre: Epistolary novel
- Publisher: Broadview Press
- Publication date: 1792
- Publication place: Great Britain
- Pages: 488
- ISBN: 1-55111-274-4

Desmond is an epistolary novel by Charlotte Smith, first published in 1792. The novel focuses on politics during the French Revolution.

Unlike her previous and subsequent novels, Smith used Desmond to introduce her audiences to contemporary politics. While critics initially supported this element of Desmond, the radicalism of the French Revolution and the "conservative mood among her audience" prompted Smith to "tone down" the political references in her novels.

== Plotline ==
=== Volume 1 ===
Letter 1 Desmond to Mr. Bethel: The story begins in Bath, England where Smith introduces her hero Lionel Desmond. Desmond is a young, wealthy, and single man from England. Although he comes from a place of privilege, he is strong Jacobian supporter (meaning her supports the French Revolution). Although he is single, his affections are cast solely on a married woman who is named Geraldine Verney (Waverly is her maiden name). In this letter, Desmond writes to his friend Erasamus Bethel, an older family friend, telling him about his travels to Margate, England to meet Mrs. Fairfax (Mr. Bethel's cousin) and her daughters.

Letter 2 Desmond to Bethel: Desmond writes again to Bethel, relaying his time spent with Mrs. Fairfax and her two daughters. Despite the fact both are attractive, young, and accomplished Desmond is not interested in them due to his love for Geraldine Verney. Desmond, in an attempt to impress Geraldine, Desmond volunteered to escort her younger brother---Waverly---to France with Desmond. Waverly remains with Desmond at the Fairfaxes, however, he is snubbed by the two daughters since they are more interested in flirting with Lord Newsminster (a wealthy but unintelligent Lord from the area).

Letter 3 Bethel to Desmond: Bethel warns Desmond against falling in love with Geraldine (since she is married). Bethel draws on his own experience and retells the story of his young foolish behavior. He starts by relaying when he foolishly almost spent all of his spending money by partying and gambling (which he was able to recover most but not all) and then told Desmond about when he married a poor woman whose vanity consumed her. His wife spent absurd amounts of money and then left him for another man (leaving Bethel and their children behind). Bethel recovered financially slightly, but lost a lot of money and a wife from this instance.

Letter 4 Desmond to Bethel: Desmond responds to Bethel saying his love to Geraldine is true/pure, and he is not being foolish. Then, he goes on to recount a story about Mrs. Fairfax and Lord Newminster. Newminster, being an arrogant idiot, came to the Farifax's house where they all adore him; once he was there, he put his dirty boots on the couch and started to talk to and feed the dog chocolate and bread (despite the fact he was acting rudely and vapidly, the ladies all swooned over him because he was an aristocrat). At that moment a man named the General came bringing the news that France abolished nobility; all characters were upset except Desmond. On the way home, Miss Fairfax brings the topic up to Desmond. Desmond's clear support of the French Revolution angers her, causing her to try to catch up to Lord Newminster's carriage.

Letter 5 Desmond to Bethel: Desmond is waiting on Geralidne's brother Waverly to leave for France, but Waverly is off on a trip and will meet him in a week. Also, Desmond mentions to Bethel that his uncle, Uncle Danby, reached out and threatened Desmond not to leave for France or else Desmond would not get his inheritance. Desmond disregards his Uncle Danby's advice and goes anyway.

Letter 6 Desmond to Bethel: Waverly did not show up for his trip, but instead sent a messenger saying he will meet Desmond in France (Waverly instead was out carousing with a bunch of fake friends). The Doctor and Clergyman (Mr. Sidebottom) fought with a man while they were at the tavern over politics. After discussing politics, both men snub a poor French widow whose husband died leaving her destitute in England; she asked the men for money, but instead of giving real help Mr. Sidebottom gives nothing and the Doctor gives her sixpence (which is not enough for the passage) and chastising advice. Desmond helps her, pays for their trips, and travels with her on the boat to France.

Letter 7 Desmond to Bethel: Desmond introduces his new friend Montefleuri in his letter to Bethel. Desmond takes note in this letter that France is not dead (it is not war-torn) but alive (it is thriving and beautiful).

Letter 8 Desmond to Bethel: Desmond explains Monteflueir's backstory. Montfleuri is 35 years old, his father died in America which caused his mother to send his sisters off to Convents, Monteflueri rescued two who were in the process of becoming nuns, and then his mom died. Desmond also mentions Monteflueir's younger sister (Madame de Boisbelle); he calls her beautiful and interesting, and also mentions her husband unfaithful and not present. Monteflueri takes Desmond to a party, where Montefleuri and an Abbe get into a fight over the French Revolution.

Letter 9 Desmond to Bethel: Desmond comments how Mr. Bethel has not responded. He also discusses a long political discussion he had with Montefluri. He ends the letter saying Geraldine sent a large letter for his brother, and Desmond hopes there is a letter in there for him.

Letter 10 Desmond to Bethel: Desmond offered to help Waverly with some family affairs so he could write to Geraldine. Although Desmond knows he is trying to pursue a married woman, he asks Bethel not to lecture him. Desmond says thank you for writing back (although the readers never saw Bethel's response letter). Desmond laments that Geraldine is unhappy because Mr. Verney (her husband) is gambling like crazy (Desmond read about it in the paper). In this letter Desmond also admires Madame de Boisbelle (who he clearly likes) and talks about Montefleuri's other younger sister Julie who always has a sense of sadness to her since she was so young when she was prepared for the nunnery. Waverly at first liked Julie, but his sister wanted him to marry someone seriously and Waverly and Julie aren't a good match (due to different religions and home-countries). Desmond remarks on the beauty of the Montfleuri's estate, and how Montfleuri is a good master to tenants (the tenants are happy because they are treated well and have nice housing). Despite Montefleuri's positive efforts in the community, ironically the local Monks try to counteract Monteflueri's efforts. Although Montefleuri has trouble with the monastery in general, he has a good relationship with one Monk named Father Cypriano. Desmond ends the letter saying he must go because Josephine (aka Madame de Boisbelle) called him away (which indicates their romantic relationship).

Letter 11 Bethel to Desmond: Bethel tells Desmond to pursue Josephine and not Geraldine. Bethel tells Desmond about Geradline's situation (since he assumed Desmond was moving on). Mr. Verney lost their estate (it was already mortgaged). Due to this, Mr. Verney is trying to gather more money, but it has placed Gerdaline in a bad situation, Mr. Bethel ends his letter by responding to Desmond's politics. Bethel is hesitant to agree with the supporters of the French Revolution on the basis that he likes the principle but wonders if it is a reality.

Letter 12 Desmond to Bethel: Desmond is visiting Monteflueri's uncle, Comete d’ Hauteville. On the way they visit another one of Montefleuri's sisters who is a Carmelite Nun (this trip was upsetting because she is always slightly sad). When they visit the uncle's property, Desmond takes note of all of the depressed and unhappy peasants working on a depleted land. The servant that greets them, Le Maire, is rude to them. Montefeluri notices his uncle's servants shooting the birds and he asks why, and Le Maire explains why that is to prevent the peasants from eating them (the Uncle would rather they starve then feed off of his land). Montfleuri and Desmond are coldly greeted by Montefleuri's uncle. Desmond, later that night, can't sleep and dreams of Geraldine outside in a hurricane. In this dream, he tries to save her but both her and her child dies. Desmond, unable to sleep, decides to take a walk outside in the garden and graveyard.

Letter 13 Desmond to Bethel: Desmond explains how Joespehine wrote to Montefleuri, while they were visiting the uncle, asking when they will return; if Josephine said if it was not soon, she and Julie would join them. Montfleuri makes a joke about Desmond and sister's attachment (despite the fact she is married). While staying with the Uncle, Desmond recounts that there were lots of arguments between the Uncle and Montefleuri. One common argument was that the Uncle owes Montfleuri money from an inheritance from Monteflueri's mother. Another common topic was politics (Montefleuri was in favor of the revolution while his Uncle was not). Desmond, the Montefleuri's Uncle, and Montefleuri's Uncle's friend at one point get into an argument about politics.

Letter 14 Desmond to Bethel: Desmond tells the story of a sailor named Brenton who he met.

Letter 15 Desmond to Bethel: Desmond is very upset about Gerdaline's position. He is deciding whether or not he will return home to England to help her or travel south with Montfleuri to see the rest of Europe. Josephine was sad to see Desmond go, but was nice about it. Desmond decides he can't help Gerdaline but will leave the next morning to help her brother Waverly who is in trouble in another part of France (as seen in the next letter).

Letter 16 Waverly's servant to Desmond: The servant claims Waverly is in trouble; Waverly agreed to a marriage with a woman he has an affair with (and for some reason he cannot get out of it).

=== Volume 2 ===
Letter 1 Geraldine to Miss Waverly/Fanny (Geraldine's younger sister): Geraldine is upset with her situation; she is particularly upset that she involved Desmond and now Desmond was hurt by engaging. She complains about Mr. Verney (for not being home and being in Yorkshire), but she chastises herself for complaining. At the end, she asks for information on Josephine (although she does not admit it, Geraldine is kind of jealous).

Letter 2 William Carmicheal to Geraldine: William Carmicheal, the doctor of Desmond, explained what happened to Geraldine: Desmond tried to stop Waverly from marrying this woman who he had an affair with, was forced into a duel with the woman's brother, and shot in the shoulder and lower arm. Montefluri and Josephine came to take care of him, but Desmond asks the doctor to reach out to Geraldine to let her know he is OK.

Letter 3 Bethel to Desmond: Bethel expresses concern over Desmond's health and he relays that Desmond's Uncle Danby blamed this misfortune on Demond's politics. Bethel also mentions that Fanny is upset over this duel but also enchanted with it (she romanticized it). Bethel ends the letter saying there is no good news regarding Mr. Verney (his situation is getting worse).

Letter 4 Desmond to Bethel: Desmond thanks Bethel for offering to come and writes about how Mr. Venrey has taken more money and left Geraldine practically destitute (and she has no one to turn to). Desmond asks Bethel to pay off Verney's debts to save Geraldine (and her house). Desmond says he wishes he could do it but is crippled and is still in France.

Letter 5 Bethel to Desmond: Bethel says he took care of Desmond's wishes very carefully (so no one would question propriety). Behel, on behalf of Desmond, also secretly pays off the family who Waverly engaged with. Bethel warns Desmond not to become too involved, yet he keeps telling Desmond about Geraldine's situation. Bethel takes a trip to visit Geraldine, and while there she reveals her concern for Desmond as well as her frustrations with her husband. Bethel feels badly and tries to comfort her, but then Mr. Verney and Lord Newminster come home drunk. Mr. Verney is incredibly rude to Geraldine (he ignores and insults her) and calls his children encumbrances. Bethel chastises him and asks why he got married if it is such a burden. Mr. Verney responds saying her beauty pulled him in and that he married out of convenience Mr. Verney and Lord Newminster prepare to leave again, but before they do Fanny comes. Fanny yells at them, and leaves to cry. Bethel follows her to comfort her. Bethel, in the letter, compliments Fanny (remarking on her strong character) and suggests Desmond marry her and not pursue Geraldine.

Letter 6 Desmond to Bethel: Desmond is greatly upset about the predicament Geraldine is in, and dismisses the idea of marrying Fanny.

Letter 7 Fanny to Miss Waverly: Fanny expresses her gratefulness and admiration for Desmond. She tells a story of Desmond's Uncle Danby telling people that Desmond's politics as well as his decision to visit France ultimately caused him to be shot. Geradline's mother, who also was in this conversation, refuses to acknowledge the help Desmond has given her family, and instead feeds into the Uncle's story. Fanny comments on how she is very annoyed with her mother..

Letter 8 Geraldine to Fanny: Geraldine is frustrated with Mr. Verney since he won't allow her to call a doctor for her baby, he won't let her join him where he is living, and he made them leave their house (and her family) in Kent. Geraldine, despite her frustration, again chastises herself for complaining. She also expresses her guilt about Desmond, and tells Fanny not to fight with his Uncle Danby but instead listen so she can gather more information to pass on. Geraldine also wishes she could see Bethel to get more news on Desmond, but unfortunately he is too far. At the end of the letter she also rebukes Fanny for complaining about their mother; Geraldine tells her not to critique her mother in front of other people.

Letter 9 Bethel to Desmond: Bethel finally admits that he understands Desmond's admiration for Geraldine, and feels very badly about her predicament. Despite this, he still suggests Desmond go after Fanny. He also reports to Desmond that Geraldine is in Richmond alone and without much money and that everyone in Bath is waiting on Waverly to return home (his mother is very anxious).

Letter 10 Desmond to Bethel: Desmond raves about his love for Geraldine and discusses politics (based on the book Bethel sent him) in his letter. He also mentions a political fight he had with a lawyer named Mr. Cranbourne.

Letter 11 Fanny to Geraldine: Fanny remarks on how upset she is with Mr. Verney for putting Geraldine in such a harsh place. She then goes on to apologize how she treated their mother, but mentions how she is still frustrated with her mother's behavior towards Geraldine (particularly because her mother refuses to help Geraldine). She also mentions her anger at her brother Waverly for not caring for anyone else in the family. Fanny also includes some gossip that Miss Elford (the town gossip) is getting married which is good because she will stop airing Waverly's and Mr. Verney's dirty laundry.

Letter 12 Geraldine to Fanny: Geraldine (hesitantly) explains her frustrations with her husband. She discusses how he came back (after being gone for a long stretch of time) and had a dinner party with his friend Colonel Scarsdale. Colonel Scarsdale, while there, made Geraldine uncomfortable by playing with her kids and giving her secrets about her husband. Geraldine hints at his romantic attachment to her and how it makes her uncomfortable. She then goes on to address the gossip regarding Miss Elford and decides that she forgives her for all of her childish behavior. Geraldline also wonders who paid off her husband's debts and saved her (she thought it was her mother). She also wonders how Desmond is doing, but she then quickly switches to a topic to a novel she just read. Geraldine comments on how it is not very moral, yet at the same time she laments how her ending is not like one of these novels.

Letter 13 Bethel to Desmond: Bethel explains how Fanny told him Mr. Verney wants to sell the Yorkshire estate and everything they own, and Fanny is upset that her mother won't do anything to help Geraldine's dire situation. Geraldine, who is now in great trouble, can't do anything to stop it. Bethel then included a second letter which claims Mr. Verney has officially sold everything, leaving his family practically destitute.

Letter 14 Geraldine to Fanny: Geraldine lets Fanny know she has officially moved and is starting to recover from the trauma. Her oldest two children are well, but the baby, William, is sick. Geraldine expresses her bitterness towards Mr Verney and their old life. Despite her situation, she is starting to find comfort in the solitude, nature, and small house. Geraldine also includes a second letter where she mentions a charming young man stopped by to say hello to her children (while Geraldine was not there), and Geraldine was wondering who it was.

Letter 15 Geraldine to Fanny: Geraldine is thankful that Colonel Scarsdale has stopped trying to pursue Geraldine (now that she is officially poor) and that baby William is doing better. Geraldine then mentions how she went for a walk at night and ran into Desmond! Initially he startles her, but he apologizes and offers to escort her home. Once they get back, he asks to see her again to which she awkwardly agrees.

Letter 16 Desmond to bethel: Desmond tells Bethel that after hearing about Geraldine's situation, he traveled to discreetly see her (he stayed at a cottage nearby to spy on her). Then, he said hello to her kids one day when they were with a servant (not Geraldine) and he retold his version of seeing her in the woods that night.

Letter 17 Geraldine to Fanny: Geraldine discusses how much she loves having Desmond around and how much the children love him (although she cleverly says it is ‘brotherly’ love). Desmond, however, is again leaving to go to France which leaves Geraldine sad to see him go. Geraldine then mentions how she just received a letter from her claiming he wants her to come to Paris with his friend the ‘Duke’ and leave their children behind. Naturally, Geraldine is upset and doesn't know what to do.

Letter 18 Desmond to Bethel: Desmond said he was going to leave England, but then ran into some men at the inn who were looking for Mrs.Verney; after talking to them, Desmond discovered that apparently Mr. Verney asked his friend Duc de Romagnecourt to escort Geraldine to France (where they will all meet up). Desmond quickly realizes, however, realizes that Mr. Verney won't be meeting them afterwards but instead sold Geraldine to Duc de Romagnecourt. Duc de Romagnecourt writes to Geraldine asking if he could come over to her place, but she responds saying she can not host because it's too small. Duc de Romagnecourt at first was mortified by her letter, but he decided to still pursue her anyway. Desmond, knowing all of this, went to Geraldine's cottage and tried to help her. Geraldine explained to Desmond her plan was to refuse him again. Desmond, unsatisfied with her plan was going to leave, but she invited him for breakfast. Afterwards, the situation is the center of the discussion again and they discuss her options. Geraldine believes nothing bad will happen (she says this half-heartedly), but Desmond tries to explain how dire the situation is especially because she has no manservant or any protection. Desmond asked he could stay at his cottage to hopefully protect her and she agreed.

=== Volume 3 ===
Letter 1 Desmond to Bethel: Desmond visited Geraldine after Duc de Romagnecourt came again, and Geradline recounted how this time he strongly insisted (or forcingly insisted) she come with him because her husband owes him debts (and he insinuates his desires for her as well). She tells him she can't to which he responds he will be here for the week waiting for her. Geraldine gets upset in front of Desmond which in return causes Desmond to get angry. Geraldine calms him down and Desmond then suggests he stay with her (for protection). Geraldine turns him down and says instead she will go to her mother (although she doesn't think she will be welcomed there)

Letter 2 Geraldine to Fanny: Geraldine writes to Fanny saying Duc de Romagnecourt pursues her so she is coming home with Desmond (she acknowledges the rumors/impropriety associated with it).

Letter 3 Bethel to Desmond: Bethel relays the time he met up with Fanny and explains how upset Fanny was over the fact her mother did not accept Geraldine when she came home (since she refused her husband's wishes). Fanny is also upset because her mother refuses to let her see Geraldine. Later that day, Bethel meets with Geraldine who is a wreck because her family has forsaken her. Due to her circumstances she decides to leave, however William is sick again.

Letter 4 Mrs. Waverly to Geraldine: Mrs. Waverly (Geraldine's and Fanny's mother) rebukes Geraldine for her behavior. She calls Geraldine's behavior with Desmond improper. She ends the letter saying Geraldine needs to follow her husband's commands especially because she can't come stay with her.

Letter 5 Desmond to Bethel: Desmond is very upset over Geraldine's situation and explains how long he has loved her. Desmond dispels the rumor that has a French mistress or wife. Desmond also expresses that he thinks Bethel should get married. Desmond mentions how he is getting very antsy, and says he will come to Bath if Bethel doesn't write back soon about Geraldine.

Letter 6 Bethel to Desmond: Bethel tells Desmond NOT to come home because it would only hurt Geraldine. He mentions how Geraldine came to tell him she has no choice but to go to Mr. Verney. Apparently, Mr. Verney sent some money and said she could bring her children if she ‘had’ to. Fanny, upon hearing this news, is a wreck but Geraldine remains strong for Fanny. Bethel sends one of his servants (Thomas Wrightson) with Geraldine and gives her some money for the trip.

Letter 7 Desmond to Bethel: Desmond asks how Geraldine is doing, and praises the restraint the French people had after the King came back. Desmond says he is going after Geraldine.

Letter 8 Bethel to Desmond: Bethel says Desmond SHOULD NOT go after Geraldine because it will only make things worse. Bethel also mentions that Geraldine cares about him, but she is incredibly guarded because there is nothing she can do (it would be improper to pursue a relationship). Bethel also tells Desmond he cannot pursue Fanny due to the age difference. Lastly, Bethel warns Desmond that his Uncle Danby is asking for Desmond's whereabouts.

Letter 9 Fanny to Geraldine: Fanny tells Geraldine that their brother Waverly married Miss Fairfax, and their mothers are hoping they will get an Irish peerage (to advance their status). Also, Miss Elford's fiance ditched her because he inherited a lot of money so he no longer needed her to advance his career. Mrs. Elford did not return home immediately, however, because she was embarrassed. Fanny still continues to relay her frustrations with her mother.

Letter 10 Geraldine to Fanny: Geraldine relays her trip to France. First, she took a 17 hour ship ride to France. Then as she was going through the countryside she cried at a procession carrying the cross. She then continued through Rouen, Vernon, Mante, and eventually ended in Paris. Geraldine goes on to say how she doesn't blame her mother (she understands her beliefs regarding wealth and propriety). Geraldine, when she arrived in Paris, was instructed to stay at Duc de Romagnecourt's hotel, but Bethel told her to stay at the Muscovie Hotel instead (for safety reasons). Mr. Verney sent a letter to Geraldine saying he is a few days behind but asks her to wait in Paris at Duc de Romagnecourt's house (instead of his hotel). Also, Duc de Romagnecourt sent an ardent letter to Geraldine expressing his excitement to see her. Geraldine, instead, looked for a small house to rent.

Letter 11 Geraldine to Fanny: Geradline describes her new place: Her new home is melancholy and retired, but that is why Geraldine likes it. Now she writes poetry now and takes walks in her free time.

Letter 12 Desmond to Bethel: Talks about politics.

Letter 13 Bethel to Desmond: Bethel mentions how he ran into Desmond's Uncle Danby. Danby insulted the French Revolution as well as Desmond and hinted at an affair between Desmond and Geraldine which Bethel shut down immediately. They depart, and Bethel asks Desmond to please come home to disprove the rumor of him and Geraldine in France together.

Letter 14 Fanny to Bethel: Fanny writes to Mr. Bethel to tell him that her mother came in and yelled at her because Geraldine was not in France with her husband but instead with Desmond. Mrs. Waverly heard this from Ms. Elford (a big gossip). Fanny knows this is not true, but she is worried with the Fairfaxes coming to visit this weekend that this rumor will spread.

Letter 15 Bethel to Fanny: Bethel believes Geraldine, but he is unsure what to think about Desmond because Desmond has been acting oddly.

Letter 16 Bethel to Fanny: Bethel says he heard from Desmond. In the letter he received, Desmond is talking primarily about political affairs (which is good because he is no longer mentioning Geraldine).

Letter 17 Desmond to Bethel: Desmond thanks Bethel for informing him about his Uncle Danby spreading rumors; Desmond only cares for Geraldine's sake. Desmond spends the rest of the letter talking about politics.

Letter 18 Fanny to Bethel: Montefleuri came to visit Fanny and her Mother, and she asked Bethel if he knew why. She also asks Bethel if he has heard any news about Geraldine.

Letter 19 Bethel to Fanny: Bethel says it would be improper for him to get involved. He also advises that Fanny just lets the rumor die out about Geraldine. He then says he just received a letter which is too confusing to explain so he sends it to Fanny as well (this letter is letter 20).

Letter 20 Desmond to Bethel: Desmond finds out Geraldine left suddenly to go take care of Mr. Verney who is dying from being shot in a duel. She left her children behind to travel to Avignon by herself (which is dangerous) so that she can care for Mr. Verney while he is dying (and he can apologize). Desmond goes after her.

Letter 21 Montfleuri to Desmond: Montefleuri professes his love to Fanny and asks that Desmond tells him where he is in France. Montefleuri also mentions he is frustrated that Desmond never mentioned his feelings for Geraldine before.

Letter 22 Desmond to Bethel: Desmond explains his intentions of following Geraldine to France was pure; he followed her in disguise from a distance at first. Desmond originally followed her and her children to check in on them while in France. When Geraldine left suddenly, however, so he finally revealed himself to Peggy (their female servant) and asked where Geraldine went. Desmond left after her especially because she was alone (which put her in danger).

Letter 23 Geraldine to Fanny: Geraldine describes her trip to go see her husband. While she is on her way, Geraldine ends up at a safe house for criminals where she feels uncomfortable (she feels as though she will be taken). Right before she is about to be attacked (by a bandit with a knife) she passes out and Desmond saves her. They go on their way to the Castle de Hautville, where they find strangers are occupying the house (since the owners abandoned it). They talk to the inhabitants, and continue looking for Mr. Verney. Geraldine, before they see Mr. Verney, tells Desmond that if Mr. Verney doesn't make it then she would want to marry Desmond. They finally found Mr. Verney in a terrible state (the village is unnamed); Geraldine, feeling sorry for him, forgave him and took care of him.

Letter 24 Desmond to Bethel: Mr. Verney, before he dies, thanks Desmond for all of this help with Geraldine and asks Desmond to marry her. He signs a document officializing this. After the funeral, Montefleuri and Fanny suddenly show up and they rejoice at seeing each other again.

Letter 25 Desmond to Bethel: Josephine had a child with a military officer she had an attachment with; Desmond adopted the child so that she would not be disgraced. Desmond also clears up that Mr. Verney died by engaging in the revolution (fighting against the people) not by thugs or bandits.

Letter 26 Desmond to Bethel: Desmond emphasizes how much he loves Geraldine and how happy he is.

== Historical context ==
Desmond took place during a time of revolutionary change world-wide (specifically in Europe and its colonies). Desmond is one of many novels which belongs in a larger discussion regarding the validity and the morality of the French Revolution. The French Revolution was a unique revolution in the sense that this revolution was changing an already established political system and country. Although the American Revolution came before the French Revolution, the French Revolution had more impact in Europe for a few different reasons: (1) France was closer to other European countries thus it could strongly influence neighboring countries (while America was far away), (2) France would be undergoing a domestic change versus America was simply a colony claiming independence, and Europe—Britain in particular—understood the value of liberty and independence (similar to how a child claims independence from its mother). What made the French Revolution so radical (and a strong discussion point among many scholars and authors) was because the idea of abolishing a monarchy and rebuilding an already established country was completely foreign. This radical thinking spread to other neighboring countries, such as Great Britain; however, in these other countries conservatives (Anti-Jacobins) dominated and the aristocracy was kept.

Those who were in favor of the French Revolution and wanted to abolish the monarchy were the Jacobins (their name derived from a club---the Jacobin Club--- where they all used to gather) and those opposed to the French Revolution who wanted to keep the aristocracy were called Anti-Jacobins. The Jacobins were a complicated and radical group; originally, they started off as a relatively moderate group that was integral to the beginning of the French revolution. Once the aristocratic government was overthrown in August of 1792 and the Jacobins transitioned into a place of power, however, they became more extremist. Maximillien Robespierre took over and their policies became oppressive and violent (these policies included price controls, food seizures, and imprisonment) which ultimately led to the Reign of Terror (Lafayette at one point called them “a sect that infringes sovereignty and tyrannies citizens”). Ironically, most of the leaders of the Jacobins were from the bourgeoisie (the wealthy middle-class population of France) not the sans-culottes (the poor population of France). Some of the goals of the Jacobins included the separation of participation in politics from land-owning, strengthening general radical ideals, and protecting the French government from attack of French aristocracy. Alternatively, the Anti-Jacobins were the individuals who wanted to follow the Status Quo regarding politics. Naturally, those whose positions of power were supported by this ‘Status Quo’ (aristocracy/wealthy) wished to maintain the old system.

Many British authors and scholars engaged in this conversation as well, and identified themselves as Jacobins and Anti-Jacobins which led to a mixed representation regarding the French Revolution in literature at the time. Political authors and advocates (both poets and novelists) who were Jacobins included such Thomas Paine, William Wordsworth, Samuel Coleridge, William Blake, Robert Southey, William Hazlitt, Anne Radcliffe, Charlotte Smith, Frances Burney, Maria Edgeworth, Hannah More, and Mary Wollstonecraft. Anti-Jacobin advocates included Edmund Burke, Elizabeth Hamilton, Robert Bisset, Henry James Pye, Charles Lloyd, Jane West, and Edward Dubois. Jacobins wanted to create a completely new system and abolish the monarchies since the past government was riddled with inequality it would be pointless to work with what was already known. Anti-Jacobins, alternatively, wanted to build on existing structures and keep the monarchy because it is more efficient and easier to work with pre-existing structures. This conversation began in more political writings and circles, however, over time themes and concepts regarding the French Revolution trickled into novels of the time such as Desmond. Towards the beginning of the French Revolution, many activists and authors sided with the Jacobins; however support started to decrease as the French Revolution became more violent, chaotic, and in some way unsuccessful (particularly by beheading the royals and during the Reign of Terror).

Another important concept relating to the historical context is of 'idealized femininity’. Idealized femininity was the notion that focused on describing the ‘ideal’ woman by a society's standards. In the 19th century, America and the United Kingdom based their ‘ideal woman’ on a set of guidelines called the “Cult of True Womanhood” or “Cult of Domesticity.” This set of codes defined what ‘womanliness’ meant and what ‘womanly behavior’ consisted of; ultimately these codes determined that women were expected to become a wife and mother and to cultivate piety, purity, submissiveness, and domesticity in all their relations. Ultimately, The Cult of True Womanhood placed women strictly in the domestic sphere. The Cult of True Womanhood was primarily meant for middle-class families where the wife could stay home and fulfill her obligations of housekeeping, raising good children, and making her family's home a haven of health, happiness, and virtue, while the husband participated in the realms of politics, commerce, or public service and provided security and protection. Women were deemed this role because of their biological inferiority, but at the same time were praised due to the ‘sacredness’ of their role.

== Themes ==
Forbidden Love: This trope of forbidden love can primarily be seen through the characters Desmond and Geraldine. Desmond is single but Geraldine is married, so their relationship must stay strictly platonic (and follow all rules of propriety). Desmond, despite the fact their relationship is forbidden, still pursues Geraldine under the pretenses of their ‘friendship’ (he constantly follows her while traveling, provides her family with money, protects her while traveling, and eventually marries her at the end). This forbidden love trope is seen most strongly through Desmond and Geraldine, but it is not necessarily consistent throughout the novel. Desmond does have an affair with another married French woman named Josephine (Monetflurei's sister) but French customs allow this affair (while British customs deem it improper).

The hypocrisy of the wealthy, noble, and the Clergy: This trope is seen many times throughout the duration of this novel. Some example of this include when a clergy man would not help the poor French Woman who had no money and no protection to sail to France; the Clergy man, instead of doing the christlike thing and giving her money and escorting her, instead gave her a little money (but not enough) and then chastised her. Another prime example of this is when Montefleuri's uncle, out of rage and bitterness to the French Revolution, ordered for all the birds on his property to be killed so peasants would not be able to eat them (it was a cruel form of punishment). Although Comete d’ Hauteville is wealthy, he feels so justified in his title that he is willing to let those less fortunate starve.

Interrogation and Subversion of Custom: Throughout the novel, Smith, through the character Desmond, questions and undermines societal customs regarding aristocracy, marriages, and general social hierarchies of the time. This trope can be seen in many ways through many different characters throughout the novel. There are two possible reasons why Smith emphasized this theme so strongly: (1) Charlotte Smith struggled financially to keep her family afloat while her husband practically abandoned her and her children. Due to marriage customs at the time, she was not allowed to divorce him despite the fact he was abusive and not fulfilling his role of providing for his family. Smith subtly through this novel (as well as her other novels) interrogates and undermines marriage expectations and laws (particularly for the woman). (2) Since this is a Jacobin novel, Smith used the character Desmond to interrogate and undermine the aristocratic system. This interrogation of custom is most commonly seen through the clear Jacobin sentiments throughout the novel, however other social customs are interrogated as well. Smith interrogates marriage customs through the dire situation Geraldine is stuck in. Geraldine, despite the fact she embodies the ideal woman, is stuck in a marriage that ultimately is emotionally and physically abusive (her husband wants to make her a prostitute for money and is willing to abandon his children). Geraldine, due to marriage customs and the codes from The Cult of True Womanhood, cannot escape this marriage and is forced to follow her husband's commands despite the danger it puts her and her children in. Another societal custom that is examined is the concept of aristocracy. Smith throughout the novel highlights how asinine this concept is, specifically because having a title does not necessarily mean having a strong character. An example of this is Desmond's observations between Miss Fairfax and Lord Newminster; Lord Newminster lacks class and grace yet Ms. Fairfax swoons over him because she wants to marry him for his title. This scene just shows the absurdity in aristocracy leading to power.
