= A Letter on Justice and Open Debate =

2020 open letter defending free speech in Harper's Magazine

"A Letter on Justice and Open Debate", also known as the Harper's Letter, is an open letter defending free speech published on the Harper's Magazine website on July 7, 2020, with 153 signatories, criticizing what it called "illiberalism" spreading across society. While the letter denounced President Donald Trump as "a real threat to democracy", it argued that hostility to free speech was becoming widespread on the political left as well.

== Background ==
Writers Robert Worth, George Packer, David Greenberg, Mark Lilla, and Thomas Chatterton Williams drafted the letter. Williams, described by The New York Times as having "spearheaded" the effort, was initially worried that its timing might cause it to be seen as a reaction to the George Floyd protests, which he considered a legitimate response to police brutality in the United States. Chatterton ultimately decided to publish the letter, citing various recent events, such as the firing of David Shor for tweeting about academic research that found that looting and vandalism by protestors caused Richard Nixon's victory in the 1968 United States presidential election.

In total, around 20 people contributed to the letter's contents.

== Summary ==
The letter describes right-wing illiberalism and then-US president Donald Trump as "a real threat to democracy", but argues that the political left engages in censorship of its own, denouncing "an intolerance of opposing views, a vogue for public shaming and ostracism, and the tendency to dissolve complex policy issues in a blinding moral certainty." Per the letter, "Editors are fired for running controversial pieces; books are withdrawn for alleged inauthenticity; journalists are barred from writing on certain topics; professors are investigated for quoting works of literature in class; a researcher is fired for circulating a peer-reviewed academic study; and the heads of organizations are ousted for what are sometimes just clumsy mistakes", "The restriction of debate, whether by a repressive government or an intolerant society, invariably hurts those who lack power and makes everyone less capable of democratic participation", and "We need to preserve the possibility of good-faith disagreement without dire professional consequences." The letter concludes, "If we won’t defend the very thing on which our work depends, we shouldn’t expect the public or the state to defend it for us."

== Signatories ==
The letter is signed by 152 people, mostly scholars and writers. They include academics from Harvard University, Yale University, Princeton University, and Columbia University.

Notable signatories include linguists Noam Chomsky and John McWhorter; fiction writers J. K. Rowling, Salman Rushdie, Margaret Atwood, Martin Amis, John Banville, Daniel Kehlmann, and Jeffrey Eugenides; world chess champion Garry Kasparov; political scientist Francis Fukuyama; feminist Gloria Steinem; cognitive psychologist Steven Pinker; journalists Fareed Zakaria, Malcolm Gladwell, Anne Applebaum, Ian Buruma, David Frum, and David Brooks; composer Wynton Marsalis; writer and former Leader of the Liberal Party of Canada Michael Ignatieff; political theorist Michael Walzer; economist Deirdre McCloskey; poet Roya Hakakian; surgeon Atul Gawande; music journalist Greil Marcus; and social psychologist Jonathan Haidt. Signatories generally did not know who had signed the letter until it was published. At least one, Jennifer Finney Boylan, expressed qualms about some of the other signatories but affirmed her endorsement. Others who reaffirmed their support for the letter's contents, such as Katha Pollitt, said they disagreed with some of the signatories on other issues but did not mind signing the same statement.

=== Full list ===
- Elliot Ackerman
- Saladin Ambar
- Martin Amis
- Anne Applebaum
- Marie Arana
- Margaret Atwood
- John Banville
- Mia Bay
- Louis Begley
- Roger Berkowitz
- Paul Berman
- Sheri Berman
- Reginald Dwayne Betts
- Neil Blair
- David W. Blight
- Jennifer Finney Boylan
- David Bromwich
- David Brooks
- Ian Buruma
- Lea Carpenter
- Noam Chomsky
- Nicholas Christakis
- Roger Cohen
- Frances D. Cook
- Drucilla Cornell
- Kamel Daoud
- Meghan Daum
- Gerald Early
- Jeffrey Eugenides
- Dexter Filkins
- Federico Finchelstein
- Caitlin Flanagan
- Richard T. Ford
- Kmele Foster
- David Frum
- Francis Fukuyama
- Atul Gawande
- Todd Gitlin
- Kim Ghattas
- Malcolm Gladwell
- Michelle Goldberg
- Rebecca Goldstein
- Anthony Grafton
- David Greenberg
- Linda Greenhouse
- ~~Kerri Greenidge~~ (withdrawn)
- Rinne B. Groff
- Sarah Haider
- Jonathan Haidt
- Roya Hakakian
- Shadi Hamid
- Jeet Heer
- Katie Herzog
- Susannah Heschel
- Adam Hochschild
- Arlie Russell Hochschild
- Eva Hoffman
- Coleman Hughes
- Hussein Ibish
- Michael Ignatieff
- Zaid Jilani
- Bill T. Jones
- Wendy Kaminer
- Matthew Karp
- Garry Kasparov
- Daniel Kehlmann
- Randall Kennedy
- Khaled Khalifa
- Parag Khanna
- Laura Kipnis
- Frances Kissling
- Enrique Krauze
- Anthony Kronman
- Joy Ladin
- Nicholas Lemann
- Mark Lilla
- Susie Linfield
- Damon Linker
- Dahlia Lithwick
- Steven Lukes
- John R. MacArthur
- Susan Madrak
- Phoebe Maltz Bovy
- Greil Marcus
- Wynton Marsalis
- Kati Marton
- Debra Mashek
- Deirdre McCloskey
- John McWhorter
- Uday Mehta
- Andrew Moravcsik
- Yascha Mounk
- Samuel Moyn
- Meera Nanda
- Cary Nelson
- Olivia Nuzzi
- Mark Oppenheimer
- Dael Orlandersmith
- George Packer
- Nell Irvin Painter
- Greg Pardlo
- Orlando Patterson
- Steven Pinker
- Letty Cottin Pogrebin
- Katha Pollitt
- Claire Bond Potter
- Taufiq Rahim
- Zia Haider Rahman
- Jennifer Ratner-Rosenhagen
- Jonathan Rauch
- Neil Roberts
- Melvin Rogers
- Kat Rosenfield
- Loretta J. Ross
- J. K. Rowling
- Salman Rushdie
- Karim Sadjadpour
- Daryl Michael Scott
- Diana Senechal
- Jennifer Senior
- Judith Shulevitz
- Jesse Singal
- Anne-Marie Slaughter
- Andrew Solomon
- Deborah Solomon
- Allison Stanger
- Paul Starr
- Wendell Steavenson
- Gloria Steinem
- Nadine Strossen
- Ronald S. Sullivan Jr.
- Kian Tajbakhsh
- Zephyr Teachout
- Cynthia Tucker
- Adaner Usmani
- Chloé Valdary
- Helen Vendler
- Judy B. Walzer
- Michael Walzer
- Eric K. Washington
- Caroline Weber
- Randi Weingarten
- Bari Weiss
- Cornel West
- Sean Wilentz
- Garry Wills
- Thomas Chatterton Williams
- Robert F. Worth
- Molly Worthen
- Matthew Yglesias
- Emily Yoffe
- Cathy Young
- Fareed Zakaria

== Reaction ==
The letter drew mixed reactions on social media. In an opinion piece for CNN, John Avlon praised the letter, writing, "Demonizing principled disagreement does not advance liberal values—it fuels negative partisan narratives that Trump's reelection depends on. It can distract from actual purveyors of hate, and a sitting President who advances policies that are often racist or homophobic as well as anti-immigrant." In another CNN opinion piece, Jeff Yang criticized the letter, writing, "it's hard not to see the letter as merely an elegantly written affirmation of elitism and privilege", and that the signatories "in the face of resultant backlash, dismissed rebuttals and positioned themselves as beleaguered victims of the current culture, turning their support for open debate and free expression into an example of stark hypocrisy or sly gaslighting." Historian Nicole Hemmer criticized the letter's timing, saying that the letter primarily blamed cancel culture for disrupting free and open conversations at a moment during the George Floyd protests when it was becoming clearer what influence institutions had in controlling debate.

Vox writer and signatory Matthew Yglesias faced pushback from transgender coworker Emily St. James, who criticized the letter for being signed by "several prominent anti-trans voices". This included Rowling, who attracted controversy for her comments on transgender issues.

A response letter, "A More Specific Letter on Justice and Open Debate", signed by over 160 people in academia and media, critiqued the Harper's letter as a plea to end cancel culture by successful professionals with large platforms while excluding others who have been "cancelled for generations". The response included what it said were specific incidents in which Black people were silenced by their institutions. Multiple signatories omitted either their names or institutional affiliations, citing fear of "professional retaliation".

Kerri Greenidge later asked for her name to be removed from the Harper's letter, which was done.

In his publication Techdirt, Mike Masnick characterized the letter as public figures mostly denouncing cases that involved "people criticizing them (or their friends)".

== See also ==
- Regressive left
- Cancel culture
- Authoritarianism
- Horseshoe theory
