= Maria: or, The Wrongs of Woman =

1798 unfinished novel by Mary Wollstonecraft

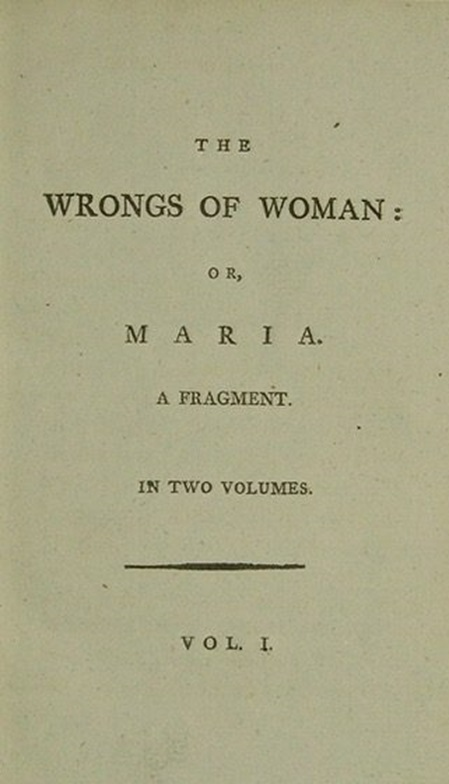
- Title page, 1798
- Author: Mary Wollstonecraft
- Genre: philosophical novel, gothic novel
- Publication date: 1798

Maria: or, The Wrongs of Woman is Mary Wollstonecraft's unfinished novelistic sequel to her revolutionary political treatise A Vindication of the Rights of Woman (1792). The Wrongs of Woman was published posthumously in 1798 by her husband, William Godwin, and is often considered her most radical feminist work.

Wollstonecraft's philosophical and gothic novel revolves around the story of a woman imprisoned in an insane asylum by her husband. It focuses on the societal rather than the individual "wrongs of woman" and criticizes what Wollstonecraft viewed as the patriarchal institution of marriage in eighteenth-century Britain and the legal system that protected it. However, the heroine's inability to relinquish her romantic fantasies also reveals women's collusion in their oppression through false and damaging sentimentalism. The novel pioneered the celebration of female sexuality and cross-class identification between women. Such themes, coupled with the publication of Godwin's scandalous Memoirs of Wollstonecraft's life, made the novel unpopular at the time it was published.

Twentieth century feminist literary critics have embraced the work, integrating it into the history of the novel and feminist discourse. It is most often viewed as a fictionalized popularization of the Rights of Woman, as an extension of Wollstonecraft's feminist arguments in Rights of Woman, and as autobiographical.

== Composition and plot summary ==
=== Drafts ===
Wollstonecraft struggled to write The Wrongs of Woman for over a year; in contrast, she had dashed off A Vindication of the Rights of Men (1790), her reply to Edmund Burke's Reflections on the Revolution in France (1790), in under a month and A Vindication of the Rights of Woman (1792) in six weeks. By the time she began The Wrongs of Woman however, she had a small daughter and perhaps a larger experience of womanhood. Godwin comments:

She was sensible how arduous a task it is to produce a truly excellent novel; and she roused her faculties to grapple with it. All her other works were produced with a rapidity, that did not give her powers time fully to expand. But this was written slowly and with mature consideration. She began it in several forms, which she successively rejected, after they were considerably advanced. She wrote many parts of the work again and again, and, when she had finished what she intended for the first part, she felt herself more urgently stimulated to revise and improve what she had written, than to proceed, with constancy of application, in the parts that were to follow.

After sending the manuscript to an acquaintance, George Dyson, for feedback, Wollstonecraft wrote to him, saying, “I am vexed and surprised at your not thinking the situation of Maria sufficiently important.” Wollstonecraft attributed this lack of “delicacy of feeling” to Dyson's male gender. She went on to write that she could not “suppose any situation more distressing” for a woman of “sensibility with an improving mind” to be bound to a husband like Maria's.

Wollstonecraft also researched the book more than her others. By assuming the responsibilities of fiction editor and reviewing almost nothing but novels, she used her editorial position at Joseph Johnson's Analytical Review to educate herself regarding novelistic techniques. She even visited Bedlam Hospital in February 1797 to research insane asylums.

At Wollstonecraft's death in 1797, the manuscript was incomplete. Godwin published all of the pieces of the manuscript in the Posthumous Works, adding several sentences and paragraphs of his own to link disjunct sections.

=== Plot summary ===
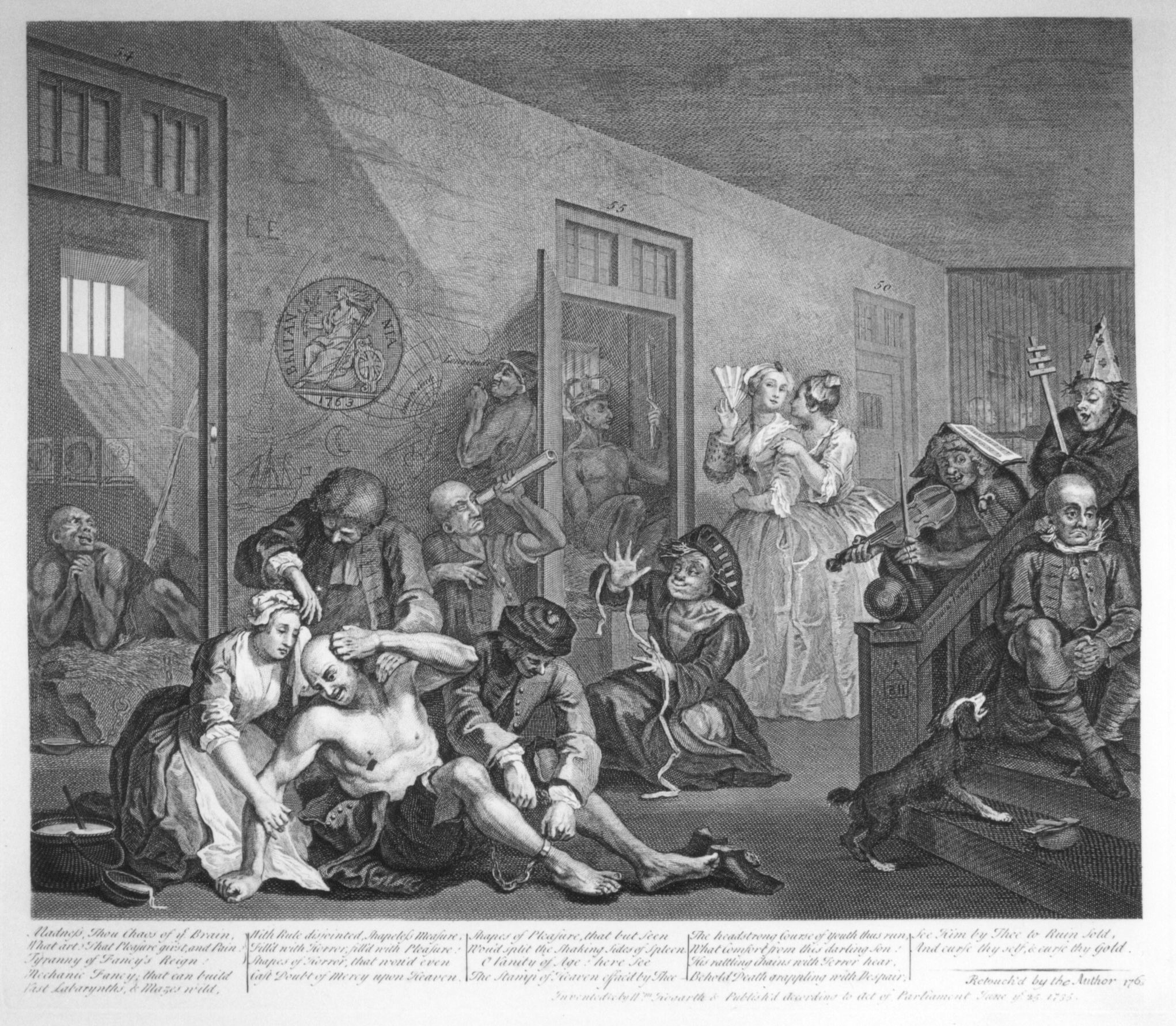
Final plate from William Hogarth's A Rake's Progress, showing Bedlam, a famous insane asylum in Britain

The Wrongs of Woman begins in medias res with the upper-class Maria's unjust imprisonment by her husband, George Venables. Not only has he condemned Maria to live in an insane asylum, but he has also taken their child away from her. She befriends one of her attendants in the asylum, an impoverished, lower-class woman named Jemima, who, after realizing that Maria is not mad, agrees to bring her a few books. Some of these have notes scribbled in them by Henry Darnford, another inmate, and Maria falls in love with him via his marginalia. The two begin to communicate and eventually meet. Darnford reveals that he has had a debauched life, waking up in the asylum after a night of heavy drinking, he has been unable to convince the doctors to release him.

Jemima tells her life story to Maria and Darnford, explaining that she was born a bastard. Jemima's mother died while she was still an infant, making her already precarious social position worse. She was therefore forced to become a servant in her father's house and later bound out as an apprentice to a master who beat her, starved her, and raped her. When the man's wife discovers that Jemima is pregnant with his child, she is thrown out of the house. Unable to support herself, she aborts her child and becomes a prostitute. She becomes the kept woman of a man of some wealth who seems obsessed with pleasure of every kind: food, love, etc. After the death of the gentleman keeping her, she becomes an attendant at the asylum where Maria is imprisoned.

In chapters seven through fourteen (about half of the completed manuscript), Maria relates her own life story in a narrative she has written for her daughter. She explains how her mother and father loved their eldest son, Robert, more than their other children and how he ruled "despotically" over his siblings. To escape her unhappy home, Maria visited that of a neighbor and fell in love with his son, George Venables. Venables presented himself to everyone as a respectable and honorable young man; in actuality, he was a libertine. Maria's family life became untenable when her mother died and her father took the housekeeper as his mistress. A rich uncle who was fond of Maria, unaware of Venables' true character, arranged a marriage for her and gave her a dowry of £5,000.

Maria quickly learned of her husband's true character. She tried to ignore him by cultivating a greater appreciation for literature and the arts, but he became increasingly dissolute: he whored, gambled, and bankrupted the couple. Maria soon became pregnant after unwanted sexual encounters with her husband. As Maria's uncle is leaving for the continent, he warns Maria of the consequences should she leave her husband. This is the first time that separation or divorce are discussed in the novel and Maria seems to take his words as inspiration rather than the warning they are meant to be. After Venables attempts to pay one of his friends to seduce Maria (a man referred to only as 'Mr. S') so that he can leave her for being an adulteress, Maria tries to leave him. She initially escapes and manages to live in several different locations, often with other women who have also been wronged by their husbands, but he always finds her. When she tries to leave England with her newborn child and the fortune her now deceased uncle has left them, her husband seizes the child and imprisons Maria in the asylum. At this point the completed manuscript breaks off.

=== Fragmentary endings ===
The fragmentary notes for the remainder of the novel indicate two different trajectories for the plot and five separate conclusions. In both major plot arcs, George Venables wins a lawsuit against Darnford for seducing his wife; Darnford then abandons Maria, flees England, and takes another mistress. When she discovers this treachery, Maria loses the child she was carrying by Darnford (either through an abortion or a miscarriage). In one ending, Maria commits suicide. In another, more complete ending, Maria is saved from suicide by Jemima who has found her first daughter. Maria agrees to live for her child (as Wollstonecraft herself had done after her second suicide attempt). Jemima, Maria and Maria's daughter form a new family.

== Style ==
In her pieces for the Analytical Review, Wollstonecraft developed a set of criteria for what constitutes a good novel:

A good tragedy or novel, if the criterion be the effect which it has on the reader, is not always the most moral work, for it is not the reveries of sentiment, but the struggles of passion — of those human passions, that too frequently cloud the reason, and lead mortals into dangerous errors ... which raise the most lively emotions, and leave the most lasting impression on the memory; an impression rather made by the heart than the understanding: for our affections are not quite voluntary as the suffrages of reason. (emphasis Wollstonecraft's)

Wollstonecraft believed that novels should be "probable" and depict "moderation, reason, and contentment". Thus it is surprising that The Wrongs of Woman draws inspiration from works such as Ann Radcliffe's A Sicilian Romance (1790) and relies on gothic conventions such as the literal and figurative "mansion of despair" to which Maria is consigned. But it does so to demonstrate that gothic horrors are a reality for the average Englishwoman. Using elements of the gothic, Wollstonecraft portrays Maria's husband as tyrannical and married life as wretched. As Wollstonecraft herself writes in the "Preface" to The Wrongs of Woman:

In many instances I could have made the incidents more dramatic, would I have sacrificed my main object, the desire of exhibiting the misery and oppression, peculiar to women, that arise out of the partial laws and customs of society.

One model for Wollstonecraft's novel was Godwin's Caleb Williams (1794), which demonstrated how an adventurous and gothic novel could offer a social critique.

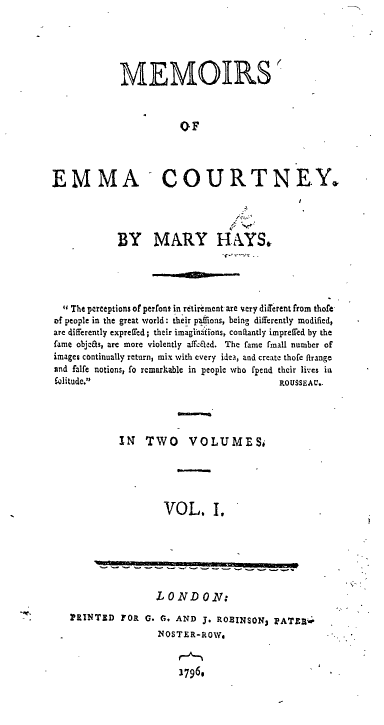
Title page from the first edition of Mary Hays's Memoirs of Emma Courtney (1796)

=== Narrator ===
The Wrongs of Woman usually uses third-person narration, although large sections of Maria's and Jemima's tales are in first-person narrative. The narrator often relates Maria's feelings to the reader through the new technique of free indirect discourse, which blurs the line between the third-person narrator and the first-person dialogue of a text. Wollstonecraft juxtaposes the events of the novel with both Maria's own retelling of them and her innermost feelings. The first-person stories allow Maria and Jemima to address each other as equals: their stories of suffering, while still allowing each character to retain an individualized sense of self, are a levelling and bonding force between the two.

=== Jacobin novel ===
The Wrongs of Woman is a Jacobin novel, a philosophical novel that advocated the ideals of the French Revolution. Wollstonecraft's novel argues along with others, such as Mary Hays's Memoirs of Emma Courtney (1796), that women are the victims of constant and systematic injustice. Wollstonecraft uses the philosophical dialogues in her novel to demonstrate women's powerlessness.

Like other Jacobin novels, The Wrongs of Woman relies on a web of suggestive character names to convey its message: Jemima is named for Job's daughter; Henry Darnford's name resembles that of Henry Darnley, the second husband of Mary, Queen of Scots; and George Venables shares a name with the notorious womanizer George, Prince of Wales. Wollstonecraft added to the reality of her philosophical text by quoting from familiar literature, such as Shakespeare, alluding to important historical events, and referencing relevant facts. The Wrongs of Woman comments on the state of women in society by rewriting earlier texts with a feminist slant, such as Henry Fielding's Tom Jones; Fielding's Mrs. Fitzpatrick becomes Wollstonecraft's Maria. These rhetorical strategies made the philosophical elements of the novel more palatable to the public.

== Themes ==
At the end of the Rights of Woman Wollstonecraft promised her readers a second part to the work. Rather than giving them another philosophical treatise, however, she offered them a novel tinged with autobiography, appropriately titled The Wrongs of Woman. In her "Preface", she writes that the novel should be considered the story of "woman" and not the story of an "individual". Wollstonecraft attempts to detail, as the scholar Anne K. Mellor has phrased it, "the wrongs done to women and the wrongs done by women" (emphasis Mellor's). The wrongs done to women include stifling and sexually repressed marriages, which Wollstonecraft describes using the language of slavery, while the wrongs done by women include a false sense of self-worth generated through the language of sensibility. Unlike Wollstonecraft's first novel, Mary: A Fiction (1788), The Wrongs of Woman offers solutions to these problems, namely an empowering female sexuality, a purpose-filled maternal role, and the possibility of a feminism that crosses class boundaries.

=== Marriage and slavery ===
In metaphors carried over from the Rights of Woman, Wollstonecraft describes marriage as a prison and women as slaves within it. In the first chapter of Maria, Maria laments, "[is] not the world a vast prison, and women born slaves?" and later she makes a politically charged allusion to the French prison, the Bastille: "marriage had bastilled me for life". Moreover, Maria's body is bought and sold like a slave's: she is worth £5,000 on the open marriage market and her new husband attempts to sell her into prostitution. Commenting on her condition, Maria states: "a wife being as much a man's property as his horse, or his ass, she has nothing she can call her own". In the Rights of Woman, Wollstonecraft had used the metaphor of slavery not only to describe the horrors of marriage as it currently existed but also to offer a juxtaposition to the possibility of a new kind of marriage, one which assumed equality between affectionate and rational partners. In The Wrongs of Woman, this option is never presented; instead, the reader is shown a series of disastrous marriages in which women are abused, robbed, and abandoned.

"Wollstonecraft's fundamental insight in Maria", according to scholar Mary Poovey, "concerns the way in which female sexuality is defined or interpreted—and, by extension, controlled—by bourgeois institutions. The primary agent of this control is marriage". Wollstonecraft deconstructs the ideology of marriage, by which women are exchangeable commodities, are objectified, and are denied their natural rights.

=== Sensibility and sentimentalism ===
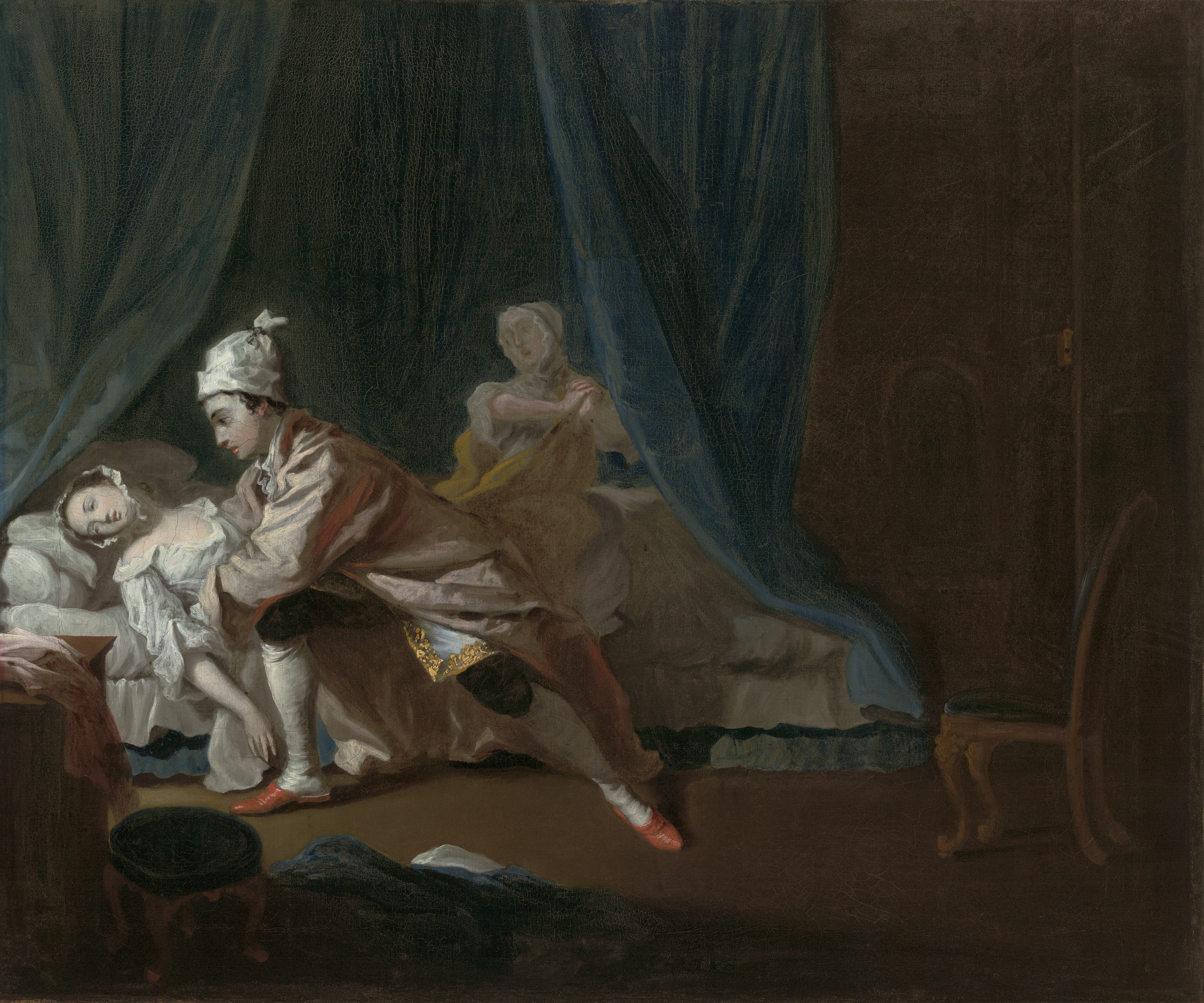
Joseph Highmore's rendition of Pamela fainting as Mr. B. attempts to rape her (1743–4), a scene that came to epitomize sensibility in the eighteenth century

Sensibility in the second half of the eighteenth century was considered both a physical and a moral phenomenon. Physicians and anatomists believed that the more sensitive people's nerves, the more emotionally affected they would be by their surroundings. Since women were thought to have keener nerves than men, it was also believed that women were more emotional than men. The emotional excess associated with sensibility also theoretically produced an ethic of compassion: those with sensibility could easily sympathize with people in pain. Thus historians have credited the discourse of sensibility and those who promoted it with the increased humanitarian efforts, such as the movement to abolish the slave trade, of the eighteenth century. But sensibility was also thought to paralyze those who had too much of it; they were weakened by constant vicarious suffering.

By the time Wollstonecraft was writing The Wrongs of Woman, sensibility had already been under sustained attack for a number of years. Sensibility, which had initially promised to draw individuals together through sympathy, was now viewed as "profoundly separatist"; novels, plays, and poems that employed the language of sensibility asserted individual rights, sexual freedom, and unconventional familial relationships based only upon feeling. Sensibility seemed to many, particularly during a time of political reaction, to offer too much political power to women and to emasculate British men needed for fighting France.

All of Wollstonecraft's writings betray a tortured relationship with the language of sensibility and The Wrongs of Woman is no exception. As feminist scholar Mitzi Myers observed, Wollstonecraft is usually described as an "enlightened philosopher strenuously advocating the cultivation of reason as the guide to both self-realization and social progress", but her works do not unambiguously support such a model of selfhood. Her emphasis on "feeling, imagination, and interiority" mark her as a Romantic, particularly in Letters Written in Sweden, Norway, and Denmark (1796). Repeatedly, in both her fiction and non-fiction, Wollstonecraft argues that the proper understanding of one's emotions leads to a transcendent virtue.

However, because Wollstonecraft herself is contradictory and vague in the unfinished Wrongs of Woman, there is no real scholarly consensus on what exactly the novel says about sensibility. Wollstonecraft is intentionally breaking the conventions of sentimental fiction, but exactly what her goals are in doing so is unclear. For example, Maria and Jemima can seemingly be identified with the traditional categories of "reason" (Jemima) and "sensibility" (Maria), but since such couples were usually male and female, Wollstonecraft's characterization challenges conventional definitions of gender.

Some critics interpret Maria's story ironically, arguing that the juxtaposition of Maria's sentimental and romantic narrative with Jemima's harsh and bleak narrative encourages such a reading. In this interpretation, Maria's narrative is read as a parody of sentimental fiction that aims to demonstrate the "wrongs" that women inflict upon themselves when they overindulge in sensibility. Although Wollstonecraft promotes sensibility in this text, it is not the same kind that she condemns in the Rights of Woman; proper sensibility, she contends, rests on sympathy and, most importantly, is controlled by reason. A woman with this kind of sensibility would not be "blown about by every gust of momentary feeling". Other critics see The Wrongs of Woman as a "negation" of the anti-sentimental arguments offered in the Rights of Woman. Citing Jemima's infrequent appearances in the narrative and the narrator's own use of the language of sensibility, they have difficulty in accepting the claim that the novel is undercutting or questioning the rhetoric of sensibility.

==== Female desire ====
One of the key differences between Wollstonecraft's novels and her philosophical treatises, as feminist critic Cora Kaplan has argued, is that her fiction values female emotion while her treatises present it as "reactionary and regressive, almost counter-revolutionary". The Rights of Woman portrays sexuality as a masculine characteristic, and while Wollstonecraft argues that some masculine characteristics are universal, this is not one of them. In The Wrongs of Woman, however, she accepts, relishes, and uses the sexualized female body as a medium of communication: Maria embraces her lust for Darnford and establishes a relationship with him. While in the Rights of Woman she had emphasized companionate relationships, arguing that passions should cool between lovers, in The Wrongs of Woman, she celebrates those passions. Challenging contemporary moralists such as John Gregory and Rousseau, Wollstonecraft claimed that women could be fully sexualized beings.

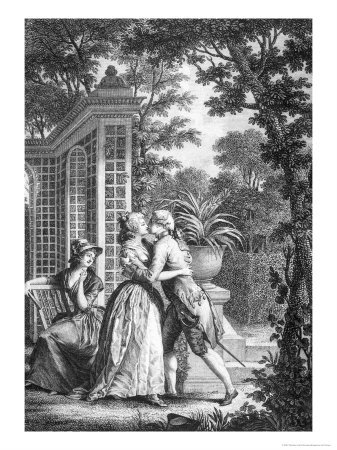
"The First Kiss of Love", from Rousseau's Julie, or the New Heloise (1761), illustrated by Nicolas-André Monsiau

Initially, Maria wants to marry Venables because of his charitable nature; she believes him to be the romantic hero that she has read about in novels. However, she later realizes his duplicity:

[George] continued to single me out at the dance, press my hand at parting, and utter expressions of unmeaning passion, to which I gave a meaning naturally suggested by the romantic turn of my thoughts. ... When he left us, the colouring of my picture became more vivid—Whither did not my imagination lead me? In short, I fancied myself in love—in love with the disinterestedness, fortitude, generosity, dignity, and humanity, with which I had invested the hero I dubbed.

One of the important questions raised by the novel is whether Maria is deluded in her relationship with Darnford. Maria writes an autobiography for her daughter in which she admits that she was misled by Venables, but critics disagree over the extent to which she is also misled by Darnford. Some suggest that Maria repeats her mistake and imagines Darnford as a hero, citing as evidence Maria's refusal to leave the madhouse, when she is free to do so, because she wants to remain with him, as well as her infatuation with Rousseau's novel Julie, or the New Heloise. She imagines Darnford as its "hero", St. Preux, the sometime lover but not husband of Julie. Maria's reading and the plots she conjures in her imagination as a result of that reading are the cause of her downfall in this interpretation: unable or unwilling to separate fiction from reality, she incorporates Darnford into her romantic fantasies. Other critics, while agreeing that Maria is led astray by Darnford, argue that it is not her sexuality and eroticism that are the problem, but her choice of partner. They argue that Wollstonecraft is not portraying female sexuality as inherently detrimental, as she had in Mary and the Rights of Woman, rather she is criticizing the directions it often takes.

=== Class and feminism ===
The structure of The Wrongs of Woman, with its interwoven tales of the similarly abused upper-middle-class Maria, the lower-middle-class sailor's wife Peggy, the working-class shopkeeper, the boarding-house owner, and the working-class domestic servant Jemima, is an "unprecedented" representation of the shared concerns of women in a patriarchal society. Wollstonecraft wrote in a letter, published as part of the preface to The Wrongs of Woman, that she aimed "to show the wrongs of different classes of women, equally oppressive, though, from the difference of education, necessarily various". Her novel is newly inclusive and one of the first works in the history of feminist literature that hints at a cross-class argument that women of different economic positions have the same interests because they are women. In her narration, Jemima asks "who ever risked anything for me?—Who ever acknowledged me to be a fellow-creature?" It is not until Maria grasps her hand in sympathy that she feels this; furthermore, it is Jemima's story that first prods Maria's own "thoughts [to] take a wider range" and "thinking of Jemima's peculiar fate and her own, she was led to consider the oppressed state of women, and to lament that she had given birth to a daughter".

Jemima is the most fleshed out of the lower-class women in the novel; through her Wollstonecraft refuses to accept the submissiveness traditionally associated with femininity and expresses a frustrated anger that would have been viewed as unseemly in Maria. Jemima's tale also challenges assumptions regarding prostitutes. Wollstonecraft rewrites the traditional narrative of the redeemed prostitute (e.g., Daniel Defoe's Some Considerations on Streetwalkers (1726)). The novel presents prostitutes as "an exploited class", akin to wives who are dependent on men, and demonstrates how they are a product of their environment. By making both Jemima and Maria prostitutes, Wollstonecraft rejects two contemporary stereotypes of the prostitute: the image of the woman who takes pleasure in her actions and is in love with her keeper and the image of the victim desirous of pity. Thus, rather than simply repulsing or eliciting the compassion of the reader, Jemima and Maria presumably forge a stronger, more lasting bond with the female reader who shares their plight.

Nevertheless, Jemima's tale still retains elements of Wollstonecraft's bourgeois ethos; Jemima and the other working-class women are only presented as Maria's equal in suffering; "women are linked across class, then, but less in solidarity than in hopelessness." As Wollstonecraft scholar Barbara Taylor comments, "Maria's relationship with Jemima displays something of the class fissures and prejudices that have marked organised feminist politics from their inception." Jemima is taught to appreciate the finer things in life when she is a kept mistress and Maria later promises to care for her. Importantly, though, in one version of the ending, it is Jemima who rescues Maria and finds her child.

=== Motherhood and the feminine self ===
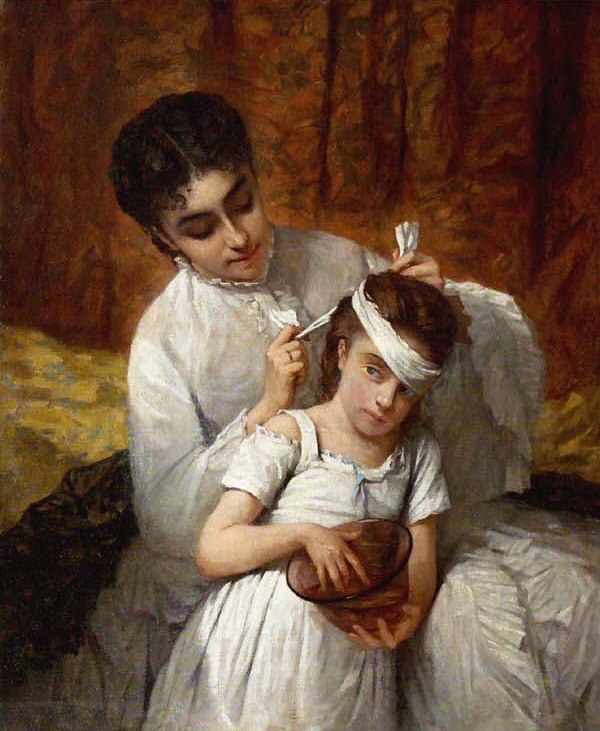
"Mother and Child" by Henriette Browne; Wollstonecraft envisioned motherhood as a liberating role for women.

While some scholars emphasize The Wrongs of Woman's criticism of the institution of marriage and the laws restricting women in the eighteenth century, others focus on the work's description of "the experience of being female, with the emotional violence and intellectual debilitation" that accompanies it (emphasis in original). It is in Wollstonecraft's depiction of a female mind educating itself and creating a specifically feminine sense of self that she "breaks new ground". Maria's role as mother allows her to instruct herself, thereby creating her own sense of self; in advising her daughter through the manuscript she is writing, Maria learns about herself and realizes her past errors. Her ability to formulate her own selfhood can be contrasted to the heroine of Wollstonecraft's first novel, Mary: A Fiction, who transfers her maternal cravings from character to character.

Furthermore, while patriarchal marriages are one of the great wrongs perpetrated upon women, Wollstonecraft argues that a greater wrong is women's lack of independence. Because they are unable to find respectable, well-paid work, they are reliant upon men. Women such as Jemima are reduced to hard physical labor, stealing, begging, or prostituting themselves in order to survive; they are demeaned by this work and think meanly of themselves because of it.

Because male-female relationships are inherently unequal in her society, Wollstonecraft endeavours to formulate a new kind of friendship in The Wrongs of Woman: motherhood and sisterhood. It is Maria's pathetic story regarding the kidnapping of her child that first interests Jemima in her plight. The novel fragments also suggest that the tale might not end with a marriage, but rather with the creation of a new kind of family, one constituted by two mothers for Maria's child. With Jemima's rescue of Maria, Wollstonecraft appears to reject the traditional romantic plot and invent a new one, necessitated by the failure of society to grant women their natural rights.

While more recent critics have emphasized the revolutionary aspects of the cross-class friendship between Jemima and Maria, others have questioned the extent of that radicalism, arguing that Jemima's story occupies a small section of the novel and is abruptly truncated. Mary Poovey also maintains that Wollstonecraft fails to extend her critique of marriage and society from the individual to the systemic level.

=== Autobiographical elements ===
Like Wollstonecraft's first novel, Mary: A Fiction, The Wrongs of Woman is heavily autobiographical; the two novels even repeat many of the same biographical details. After being abandoned by her lover and the father of her child, Gilbert Imlay (the model for Darnford), Wollstonecraft attempted to commit suicide. Her despair over these events is written into the book as well as many other experiences from the mid-1790s. Moreover, Maria Venables's family history shows clear similarities to Wollstonecraft's own. Like Maria, Wollstonecraft had a mother who favored an elder brother and she also devotedly cared for that mother during her dying days, only to be pushed away during the final moments of her life. Wollstonecraft also looked after her sisters like Maria does, albeit without the help of a wealthy uncle. Perhaps most strikingly, Wollstonecraft's sister Eliza left her husband, at Wollstonecraft's prodding, much as Maria leaves hers. As Kelly explains, autobiography is common in Jacobin novels. Philosophical novels were expected to be autobiographical; audiences believed that the philosophizing novelists would draw on their own experiences in order to illustrate their abstract principles.

== Reception and legacy ==
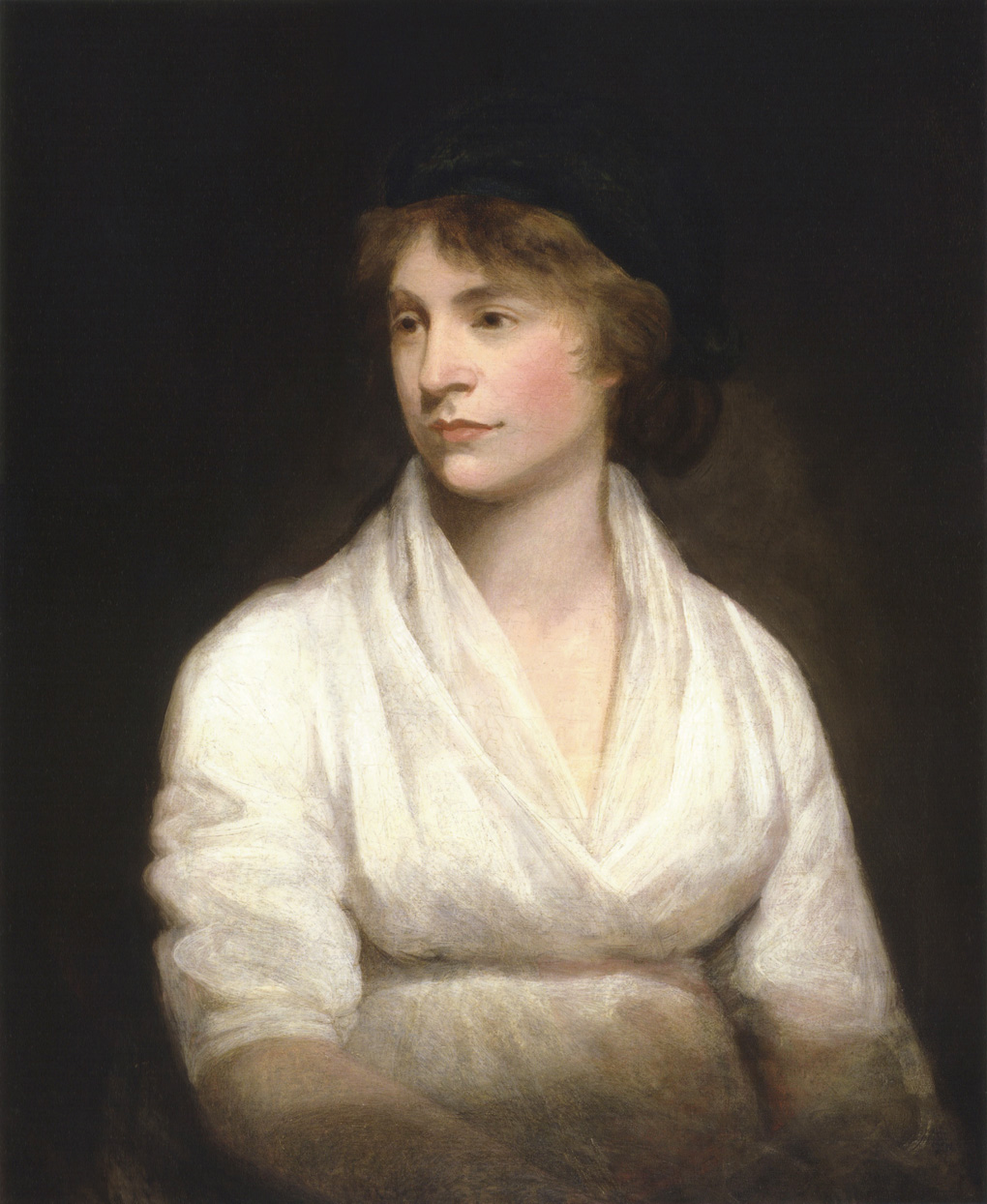
Mary Wollstonecraft by John Opie (c. 1797)

The Posthumous Works, of which The Wrongs of Woman was the largest part, had a "reasonably wide audience" when it was published in 1798, but it "was received by critics with almost universal disfavor". This was in large part because the simultaneous release of Godwin's Memoirs of the Author of A Vindication of the Rights of Woman revealed Wollstonecraft's illegitimate child and her love affairs. Most reviewers and readers transferred the unconventional and unorthodox life Wollstonecraft herself had lived onto Maria and much that Maria had said and done onto Wollstonecraft, thereby realizing Wollstonecraft's fears that her books would be read only as a mirror of her life. The eighteenth-century moralist Hannah More, for example, called The Wrongs of Woman a "vindication of adultery".

Many critics and even personal acquaintances failed to grasp Wollstonecraft's fundamental point, that Maria's "wrongs" are political, not personal. She wrote to one friend who had criticized it:

I am vexed and surprised at your not thinking the situation of Maria sufficiently important, and can only account for this want of – shall I say it? delicacy of feeling, by recollecting that you are a man – For my part I cannot suppose any situation more distressing than for a woman of sensibility with an improving mind to be bound, to such a man as I have described, for life – obliged to renounce all the humanizing affections, and to avoid cultivating her taste lest her perception of grace, and refinement of sentiment should sharpen to agony the pangs of disappointment.

Even Godwin, her husband, complained, "I do not want a common-place story of a brutal, insensible husband." Both the Anti-Jacobin Review and the Monthly Review reviewed the novel harshly. The Anti-Jacobin Review, attacking both Wollstonecraft and her book as well as Godwin's Political Justice and Memoirs, wrote:

The restrictions upon adultery constitute, in Maria's opinion, A MOST FLAGRANT WRONG TO WOMEN. Such is the moral tendency of this work, such are the lessons which may be learned from the writings of Mrs. Wollstonecraft; such the advantages which the public may derive from this performance given to the world by Godwin, celebrated by him, and perfectly consonant to the principles of his Political Justice.—But as there have been writers, who have in theory promulgated opinions subversive of morality, yet in their conduct have not been immoral, Godwin has laboured to inform the world, that the theory of Mrs. Wollstonecraft was reduced to practice; that she lived and acted, as she wrote and taught.[Footnote in original: We could point out some of this lady's pupils, who have so far profited by the instructions received from her, as to imitate her conduct, and reduce her principles to practice.] (emphasis in original)

Under the heading "Prostitution" in the index to the magazine, the editors listed only one entry: Mary Wollstonecraft. Partially because of these reactions, female sexuality would not be celebrated so overtly in Britain for another century.

While Wollstonecraft's arguments in The Wrongs of Woman may appear commonplace in light of modern feminism, they were "breathtakingly audacious" during the late eighteenth century: "Wollstonecraft's final novel made explosively plain what the Rights of Woman had only partially intimated: that women's entitlements — as citizens, mothers, and sexual beings — are incompatible with a patriarchal marriage system." However, while The Wrongs of Woman is now read as the progenitor of many feminist texts and the inspiration for many feminist arguments and rhetorical styles (e.g., the personal confession), Wollstonecraft herself was not part of a feminist movement nor did she ever argue for one. Although The Wrongs of Woman presents "woman" as "wronged", neither Wollstonecraft nor any other British woman who highlighted the inequalities suffered by women at the time (such as Mary Hays or Mary Robinson) ever put forth a collective solution. As part of the Enlightenment, they were dedicated to individualistic solutions.

== See also ==
- Timeline of Mary Wollstonecraft

== Modern reprints ==
- Wollstonecraft, Mary (1989). The Works of Mary Wollstonecraft: Elements of morality. ISBN 978-0-8147-9225-4.
- Wollstonecraft, Mary (1998). Mary: And, The Wrongs of Woman. Oxford : Oxford University Press. ISBN 978-0-19-283536-9.
- Wollstonecraft, Mary (1975). Maria: Or, The Wrongs of Woman. W. W. Norton. ISBN 978-0-393-08713-0.

== Bibliography ==
=== Primary sources ===
- —. "Review". Anti-Jacobin Review and Magazine 1 (1798): 91–93.
- —. "Review". British Critic 12 (1798): 234–235.
- —. "Review". Monthly Review 27 (November 1798): 325–27.
- Godwin, William (2001). Memoirs of the Author of A Vindication of the Rights of Woman. Broadview Press. ISBN 978-1-55111-259-6.
- Wollstonecraft, Mary (1997). The Vindications: The Rights of Men and The Rights of Woman. Broadview Press. ISBN 978-1-55111-088-2.

=== Secondary sources ===
- Barker-Bendield, G. J. (1996). The Culture of Sensibility: Sex and Society in Eighteenth-Century Britain. University of Chicago Press. ISBN 978-0-226-03714-1.
- Cañadasa, Ivan (2006). "The influence of Ben Jonson's Volpone on Mary Wollstonectaft's Maria, or The Wrongs of Woman". ANQ: A Quarterly Journal of Short Articles, Notes and Reviews. 19 (3). Taylor and Francis: 6–10. doi:10.3200/ANQQ.19.3.6-10. S2CID 162325434.
- Gubar, Susan (Autumn 1994). "Feminist Misogyny: Mary Wollstonecraft and the paradox of "It Takes One to Know One"". Feminist Studies. 20 (3). Feminist Studies, Inc.: 452–473. doi:10.2307/3178182. hdl:2027/spo.0499697.0020.303. JSTOR 3178182.
- Johnson, Claudia L. (1995). Equivocal Beings: Politics, Gender, and Sentimentality in the 1790s--Wollstonecraft, Radcliffe, Burney, Austen. University of Chicago Press. ISBN 978-0-226-40184-3.
- Johnson, Claudia L. (2002). The Cambridge Companion to Mary Wollstonecraft. Cambridge University Press. ISBN 978-0-521-78952-3.
- Jones, Vivien (1997). "Placing Jemima: women writers of the 1790s and the eighteenth-century prostitution narrative". Women's Writing. 4 (2). Taylor and Francis: 201–220. doi:10.1080/09699089700200011. Pdf.
- Kaplan, Cora (1986). Sea changes: essays on culture and feminism. Verso Books. ISBN 0-86091-151-9.
- Kelly, Gary (1989). English fiction of the romantic period, 1789-1830. Addison-Wesley Longman Ltd. ISBN 0-582-49261-0.
- Kelly, Gary (1996). Revolutionary Feminism: The Mind and Career of Mary Wollstonecraft. Palgrave Macmillan. ISBN 978-0-312-12904-0.
- Maurer, Lisa Shawn (1992). "The female (as) reader: sex, sensibility, and the maternal in Wollstonecraft's fictions". Essays in Literature. 19 (1): 36–54.
- Mellor, Anne Kostelanetz (1988). Romanticism and feminism. Indiana University Press. ISBN 0-253-35083-2.
- Mellor, Anne K. (1996). "Righting the wrongs of woman: Mary Wollstonecraft's "Maria"". Nineteenth-Century Contexts. 19 (4). Taylor and Francis, special issue: Writing women/writing power: 413–424. doi:10.1080/08905499608583434.
- Myers, Mitzi (Spring 1980). "Unfinished business: Wollstonecraft's "Maria"". The Wordsworth Circle. 11 (2). Boston University Arts & Sciences Editorial Institute: 107–114. doi:10.1086/TWC24041218. JSTOR 24041218. S2CID 165995666.
- Poovey, Mary (1985). The Proper Lady and the Woman Writer: Ideology as Style in the Works of Mary Wollstonecraft, Mary Shelley, and Jane Austen. University of Chicago Press. ISBN 978-0-226-67528-2.
- Sapiro, Virginia (1992). A Vindication of Political Virtue: The Political Theory of Mary Wollstonecraft. University of Chicago Press. ISBN 978-0-226-73491-0.
- Sunstein, Emily W. (1975). A different face: the life of Mary Wollstonecraft. HarperCollins Publishers. ISBN 0-06-014201-4.
- Taylor, Barbara (2003). Mary Wollstonecraft and the Feminist Imagination. Cambridge University Press. ISBN 978-0-521-66144-7.
- Todd, Janet M. (1980). Women's Friendship in Literature. New York: Columbia University Press. ISBN 978-0-231-04562-9.
- Todd, Janet M. (1986). Sensibility: An Introduction. Routledge. ISBN 978-0-416-37720-0.
- Todd, Janet M. (2000). Mary Wollstonecraft: A Revolutionary Life. Columbia University Press. ISBN 0-231-12184-9.
- Ty, Eleanor Rose (1993). Unsex'd Revolutionaries: Five Women Novelists of the 1790s. University of Toronto Press. ISBN 978-0-8020-7774-5.
- Wardle, Ralph M. (1951). Mary Wollstonecraft: A Critical Bibliography. Lincoln: University of Nebraska Press.
