= David H. Guston =

American scholar of science and technology policy

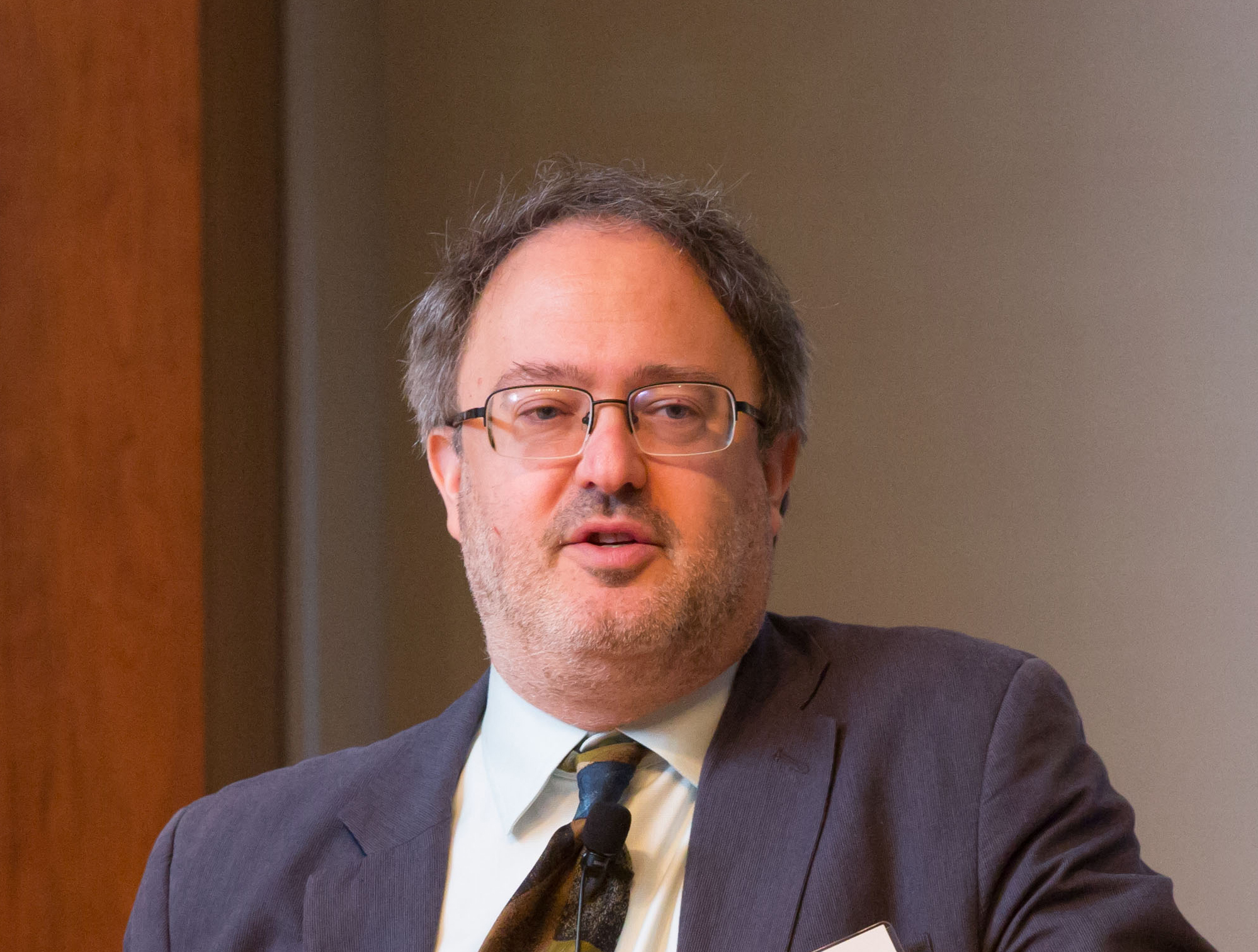
Guston in 2014

David H. Guston is a scholar of science and technology policy and a Foundation Professor at Arizona State University (ASU), where he is the founding director of the School for the Future of Innovation in Society and an associate vice provost in the Julie Ann Wrigley Global Futures Laboratory. He previously led the National Science Foundation-funded Center for Nanotechnology in Society. Guston was inducted as a fellow of the American Association for the Advancement of Science (AAAS) in 2002 and the National Academy of Public Administration (NAPA) in 2026. Guston's work focuses on research and development policy, the governance of emerging technologies, and public engagement with science.

== Education ==
Guston graduated cum laude from Yale University in 1987. In 1993, he earned a Ph.D. in political science from the Massachusetts Institute of Technology, where his thesis, under the supervision of Eugene B. Skolnikoff, Charles Stewart III, Charles Weiner, and Uday Singh Mehta, explored the shifting boundary between science and politics in post-WWII U.S. society.

== Career and research ==
Guston joined ASU in 2005 as a professor of political science and the associate director of the CSPO, which moved to ASU after Michael M. Crow moved from Columbia to become president at ASU. He was director of the NSF-funded Center for Nanotechnology in Society at ASU, focused on anticipatory governance and the real-time technology assessment of emerging nanotechnologies.

In 2015, Guston became the founding director of the School for the Future of Innovation in Society. He currently serves as an associate vice provost for discovery, engagement, and outcomes at ASU's Julie Ann Wrigley Global Futures Laboratory.

Guston's research and writing focus on the "social contract for science," the concept of "boundary organizations," the development of responsible innovation, and "anticipatory governance." His more than 200 publications include peer-reviewed articles, books and book chapters, and public commentary, and his work has been cited more than 20,000 times. His book Between Politics and Science: Assuring the Integrity and Productivity of Research won the American Political Science Association's Don K. Price prize for best book in science and technology policy in 2002

In 2017, Guston was the lead editor of a new edition of Mary Shelley's Frankenstein published by MIT Press. Reviewers say the new edition offers "a valuable set of approaches to the ethical questions the original Frankenstein raises" as well as "lessons for scientists—on hubris, intellectual property, mentorship, isolation, and the temptations of pursuing technical elegance above all else." The publication was part of ASU's Frankenstein Bicentennial Project, which Guston created and helmed with colleague Ed Finn. Finn, Joey Eschrich, and Guston now edit a new series at MIT Press, Imagination, Annotated

Guston was the founding editor of the Journal of Responsible Innovation and continues to serve on its editorial board. He also served as the North American editor of the journal Science and Public Policy

He has appeared on BBC Radio 3, BBC Radio 4, NPR's Science Friday and The Diane Rehm Show. Guston is also contributor to Issues in Science and Technology, and his opinion writing has appeared in The Wall Street Journal, The Chronicle of Higher Education, and elsewhere.
