= ALSC =

ALSC may refer to:

- Association for Library Service to Children
- Association of Literary Scholars and Critics
- Alert Life Sciences Computing, Inc.
