= Jens Zimmermann (philosopher) =

Canadian philosopher (born 1965)

- Born: Jens Michael Zimmermann; 1965 (age 60–61); Germany
- Education: University of British Columbia (Vancouver, BC, Canada) University of Mainz (Mainz, Germany)
- Occupations: Philosopher, linguist, professor
- Known for: Incarnational humanism
- Notable work: Incarnational Humanism: A Philosophy of Culture for the Church in the World (2012) Re-Envisioning Christian Humanism: Education and the Restoration of Humanity (2016) Dietrich Bonhoeffer’s Christian Humanism (2019)

Dr. Jens Michael Zimmermann (born 1965) is a German-Canadian Christian philosopher, theologian, and professor who specializes in hermeneutics and the philosophical and theological roots of humanism.

Zimmermann is a longtime educator in Vancouver. He is currently the J.I. Packer Chair of Theology at Regent College. and the professor of philosophy and theology at Trinity Western University.

He is considered the inventor of "incarnational humanism", a social philosophy combining modern humanism and Christian humanism based in incarnation.

== Early life and education ==
Zimmermann was born in 1965 in Germany, where he was raised. He began studying Music in Düsseldorf in 1988 before moving to Canada in 1990, where he attended University of British Columbia in Vancouver. He graduated with a B.A. in English in 1992. He would receive an M.A. in Comparative Literature in 1993, and a PhD in the same field in 1997.

== Career ==
Zimmermann began his teaching career at University of British Columbia in 1995 as a sessional instructor in English and German. He left University of British Columbia in 1998.

He started working at Langley campus of Trinity Western University in British Columbia where he was an assistant professor of English literature and language, German literature and language, and philosophy. In 2002, he was promoted to associate professor of English and Cultural Studies and philosophy. In 2006, he became Trinity Western's Canada Research Chair for Interpretation, Religion, and Culture, a position that he held until 2016.

Also in 2006, Zimmermann began studying a PhD in philosophy at University of Mainz (known in Germany as Johannes Gutenberg University) in Mainz, Germany. He specialized in philosophical and theological anthropology and his dissertation was called Humanism and Religion: A Philosophical Examination. He received the PhD in June 2010. After the reception of his second PhD in 2010, he was promoted again to become the professor of Philosophy & Theology at Trinity Western.

Between 2016 and 2019, Zimmermann was involved with theology education in England. He served as a visiting research fellow of theology to Trinity Hall at University of Cambridge from September 2016 to June 2017. He then served as a British Academy Visiting Research Fellow in philosophical theology to University of Oxford from August 2019 to February 2019.

In 2017, while still employed by both Trinity Western and Cambridge universities, he was invited to serve as a visiting professor of philosophy, literature, and theology at Regent College in Vancouver. He served as a visiting professor until 2019, and a year later he was brought into Regent College full time as the J.I. Packer Chair of Theology which he still holds as of March 2023.

== Philosophy and works ==
Zimmermann's studies originally focused on linguistics as his first degrees and professorial jobs were in the fields of English and German. He studied early American literature, the Victorian novel, and English poet John Milton while attaining his bachelor's degree. His shift into Comparative Literature saw him study more philosophy and theology through his studies of hermeneutics, iconoclasm, Reformation, English Puritanism, literary theory, and Middle Ages religious literature in Germany and England. His 1997 PhD dissertation was entitled English Puritans and German Pietists: A Re- Examination of Pre-Critical Hermeneutics in Light of the Anthropocentric Turn in Hermeneutics.

Zimmermann wrote his first book in 2004 entitled Recovering Theological Hermeneutics. He published a second edition in 2012. In 2006, Zimmermann co-wrote the book The Passionate Intellect: Incarnational Humanism and the Future of University Education with Norman Klassen, the associate professor of English at St. Jerome's University in Waterloo, Ontario. He published his only German-language work in October 2007, which was titled Theologische Hermeneutik: Ein Trinitarisch-Christologischer Entwur (in English: Theological Hermeneutics A Trinitarian Christological Draft).

In 2012, Zimmermann published Incarnational Humanism: A Philosophy of Culture for the Church in the World. This book won the 2013 Book Prize from the Center for Christian-Evangelical Dialogue. The book was regarded as the first book in the field of "incarnational humanism". The book explores Zimmermann's philosophy of a deeply faith-baith society. He drew inspiration from the works of Irenaeus, Augustine of Hippo, Henri de Lubac, and Dietrich Bonhoeffer.

Between 2012 and 2019, Zimmermann published three books for Oxford University via Oxford University Press. These books were Humanism and Religion: A Call for The Renewal of Western Culture (2012), Hermeneutics: A Very Short Introduction (2015), and Dietrich Bonhoeffer’s Christian Humanism (2019). He was nominated for the Louisville Grawemeyer Award from Oxford University in 2016 for Humanism and Religion. During this time he also edited the four-volume book Re-Envisioning Christian Humanism: Education and the Restoration of Humanity (2016) which compiles analyses of Christianity and humanism.

Aside from his seven published books, Zimmermann has also edited 18 books and written 33 book chapters, 12 journal articles, and 10 book reviews.

Zimmermann is considered a leading scholar in contemporary Christian humanism and hermeneutics. He is also considered a leading scholar of the works of Dietrich Bonhoeffer as many of his works involve Bonhoeffer's philosophy. His works have also included influences from Martin Heidegger, Hans-Georg Gadamer, and Hans Urs von Balthasar.

== Selected publications ==
Monographs

- Dietrich Bonhoeffer's Christian Humanism. Oxford: Oxford University Press, 2019. ISBN 9780198832560
- Hermeneutics: A Very Short Introduction. Oxford: Oxford University Press, 2015. ISBN 9780199685356
- Humanism and Religion: A Call for The Renewal of Western Culture. Oxford: Oxford University Press, 2012. ISBN 9780199697755
- Incarnational Humanism: A Philosophy of Culture for the Church in the World. Westmont, IL: InterVarsity Press, 2012. ISBN 9780830839032
- Theologische Hermeneutik: ein trinitarisch-christologischer Entwurf. Freiburg: Herder, 2008. ISBN 9783451291937
- The Passionate Intellect: Incarnational Humanism and the Future of University Education. (Co-authored with Norman Klassen). Grand Rapids, MI: Baker Academic Press, 2006. ISBN 9780801027345
- Recovering Theological Hermeneutics. Grand Rapids, MI: Baker Academic Press, 2004. ISBN 9781610976442

Edited Books

- Re-Envisioning Christian Humanism. Oxford: Oxford University Press, 2017.
- Reimagening the Sacred. Richard Kearney Debates God with James Wood, Charles Taylor, Julia Kristeva, Gianni Vattimo, Simon Critchley, Jean-Luc Marion, John Caputo, David Tracy, Jens Zimmermann and Merold Westphal. (Co-edited with Richard Kearney). New York: Columbia University Press, 2015.
- Whose Will Be Done? Essays on Sovereignty and Religion (Co-edited with John Dyck and Paul Rowe). Lanham, Maryland: Rowman & Littlefield/Lexington (2015).
- Heidegger und die Dichtung/Heidegger and Poetics. Heidegger Jahrbuch 8 (Co-edited with Alfred Denker and Holger Zaborowski). Freiburg: Alber Verlag, 2014.
- Christians and the Middle East Conflict. (Co-edited with John Dyck and Paul Rowe). London, UK: Routledge, 2014.
- A Spoke in the Wheel: The Political in the Theology of Dietrich Bonhoeffer/Dem Rad in die Speichen fallen: Das Politische in der Theologie Dietrich Bonhoeffers. (Co-edited with Kirsten Busch Nielsen and Ralf Wüstenberg). Gütersloh: Gütersloher Verlagshaus, 2013.
- God Speaks to Us: Dietrich Bonhoeffer’s Biblical Hermeneutics. (Co-edited with Ralf Wüstenberg). Germany: Peter Lang, 2013.
- Bonhoeffer, Religion and Politics: 4th International Bonhoeffer Colloquium. (Co-edited with Christiane Tietz). Germany: Peter Lang, 2012.
- Through a Glass Darkly: Suffering, the Sacred, and the Sublime in Literature and Theory. (Co-edited with Holly Nelson and Lynn Szabo). Waterloo, ON: Wilfrid Laurier University Press, 2010.
- Politics and the Religious Imagination. (Co-edited with John Dyck and Paul Rowe). London, UK: Routledge, 2010.
- Being Human, Becoming Human: Dietrich Bonhoeffer and Social Thought. (Co-edited with Brian Gregor). Eugene, OR: Wipf and Stock, 2010.
- Dietrich Bonhoeffer and Continental Thought: Cruciform Philosophy. (Co-edited with Brian Gregor). Bloomington, IN: Indiana University Press, 2009.
