= The Wordsworth Circle =

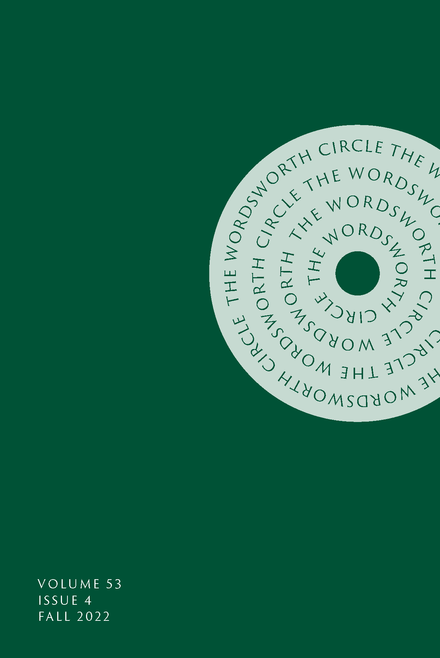
- Discipline: English literature and the Romantic period
- Language: English
- Edited by: Charles W. Mahoney

Publication details
- History: 1970–present
- Publisher: University of Chicago Press on behalf of the Boston University Arts & Sciences Editorial Institute (United States)
- Frequency: Quarterly
- Open access: Hybrid or delayed after 12 months

Standard abbreviations
- ISO 4: Wordsworth Circ.

Indexing
- ISSN: 0043-8006 (print); 2640-7310 (web)
- LCCN: 73641286
- JSTOR: 00438006
- OCLC no.: 55943246

Links
- Journal homepage; Online access; Online archive; Journal page at institute website

The Wordsworth Circle is a quarterly peer-reviewed academic journal covering studies of literature, culture, and society in Great Britain, Europe, and North America during the Romantic period from about 1760–1850. It covers work on the lives, works, and times of writers from that period, including publications and publishers. The journal includes work on non-literary figures (historians, scientists, artists, architects, philosophers, theologians, and social commentators) and topics (science, politics, religion, aesthetics, education, legal reform, and music)—anything that appeared during, impinges upon, or is of interest to Romanticists. Essay-reviews of major books appear in the fourth issue of every volume. Subscriptions include membership in the Wordsworth-Coleridge Association. The journal is published by the University of Chicago Press on behalf of the Boston University Arts & Sciences Editorial Institute.

== History ==
The journal was established in 1970 with Marilyn Gaull (Boston University) as founding editor-in-chief. She was succeeded in 2019 by Charles W. Mahoney (University of Connecticut). At the same time, the University of Chicago Press took over the journal's publication.

== Abstracting and indexing ==
The journal is abstracted and indexed in the Arts and Humanities Citation Index, Current Contents/Arts & Humanities, EBSCO databases, Modern Language Association Database, ProQuest databases, and Scopus.
