= Roger Shattuck =

American writer and teacher (1923–2005)

- Born: August 20, 1923; Manhattan, New York, New York, U.S.
- Died: December 8, 2005 (aged 82); Lincoln, Vermont, U.S.
- Occupations: Teacher and writer
- Spouse: Nora White (m. 1949)
- Awards: National Book Award (1975, Marcel Proust)

Academic background
- Education: Yale University (BA 1947)

Academic work
- Discipline: Literature
- Sub-discipline: French literature
- Institutions: Harvard University; University of Texas at Austin; University of Virginia; Boston University

Roger Whitney Shattuck (August 20, 1923 in Manhattan, New York – December 8, 2005 in Lincoln, Vermont) was an American writer and teacher. He was best known for his three books on author Marcel Proust and others on French literature, art, and music of the twentieth century. His biography of Proust, Marcel Proust (1975), won a National Book Award. He was a founding member and the second president of the anti-postmodernist literary organization the Association of Literary Scholars and Critics.

== Early life and education ==
Shattuck was born August 20, 1923 in Manhattan, New York, New York, to parents Howard Francis Shattuck, a physician, and Elizabeth (Colt) Shattuck. He studied at St. Paul's School in Concord, New Hampshire before entering Yale College.

Shattuck left Yale to join the Army Air Corps, serving as a cargo pilot in the Pacific Theater during the Second World War. He spoke little about his experience in the war, but tried writing about it his entire life. He tried capturing the moment he flew over Nagasaki, Japan with his copilot, seeing the aftermath and rubble on the ground.

After the war, he returned to school, graduating from Yale in 1947. After graduation, Shattuck then moved to Paris where he worked for UNESCO's film service. In this capacity he came into contact with luminaries of European culture such as Jean Cocteau, Alice B. Toklas and Georges Braque, and met his future wife Nora White, a dancer with the Ballets Russes.

Returning to the US, Shattuck worked in publishing at Harcourt Brace and then attended Harvard as a Junior Fellow of the Harvard Society of Fellows.

== Career ==
=== Teaching ===
Shattuck taught at Harvard University, the University of Texas at Austin, the University of Virginia, and Boston University, despite his lack of a graduate degree. He retired as a professor emeritus from Boston University in 1997.

=== Writing ===
Shattuck's essays frequently appeared in The New York Review of Books and other publications. He was the author of several highly regarded works of literary criticism: Proust's Way; The Banquet Years: The Origins of the Avant-Garde in France, 1885 to World War I; Forbidden Knowledge: From Prometheus to Pornography; and he served as editor of the restored edition of Helen Keller's memoir The Story of My Life.

In 1975, Shattuck received the National Book Award in category Arts and Letters for Marcel Proust (a split award).

=== Organizations ===
Shattuck was among the founding members of the Association of Literary Scholars and Critics, since renamed the Association of Literary Scholars, Critics, and Writers. He served as second president of the organization.

=== Academic philosophy ===
Routinely described as "one of America's leading literary scholars," Shattuck was considered a traditionalist. He became well known for his 1994 speech "Nineteen Theses on Literature," delivered to the Association of Literary Scholars and Critics. In it he argued (as point XIV), "Everything has been said. But nobody listens. Therefore it has to be said all over again—only better. In order to say it better, we have to know how it was said before."

Jacques Derrida's "Declarations of Independence", an early attempt to address questions in legal and political philosophy, was written at Shattuck's suggestion on the bicentenary. It was first given as a lecture at the University of Virginia in Charlottesville in 1976.

Upon Shattuck's death, the Yale critic Harold Bloom said of his colleague, "He was an old-fashioned, in a good sense, man of letters. He incarnated his love for literature."

== Personal life and death ==
Shattuck married Nora White in 1949. They had one son and three daughters, and remained married at the time of his death.

Shattuck died on December 8, 2005, in Lincoln, Vermont, of prostate cancer.

== Bibliography ==
- The Banquet Years: The Arts in France, 1885–1918: Alfred Jarry, Henri Rousseau, Erik Satie, Guillaume Apollinaire (1958)
- Proust's Binoculars (1963)
- Half Tame (1964)
- The Banquet Years: The Origins of the Avant-Garde in France, 1885 to World War I (1968). Revised edition of the 1958 book.
- Proust (Fontana Modern Masters, 1974)
- Marcel Proust (1975) (won National Book Award Arts & Letters prize in 1975)
- The Forbidden Experiment: The Story of the Wild Boy of Aveyron (1980)
- The Innocent Eye: On Modern Literature & the Arts (1984)
- Forbidden Knowledge: From Prometheus to Pornography (1994)
- Candor and Perversion: Literature, Education, and the Arts (1998)
- Proust's Way: A Field Guide to In Search of Lost Time (2000)
