= Association of Literary Scholars, Critics, and Writers =

The Association of Literary Scholars, Critics, and Writers (ALSCW) was organized in 1994 as the Association of Literary Scholars and Critics by a group of over 400 scholars troubled by what they saw as an over-reliance on postmodern theory in the academy. Among the founding members were Robert Alter, Joseph Brodsky, Paul Cantor, Denis Donoghue, John Hollander, Alfred Kazin, Mary Lefkowitz, Richard Poirier, Christopher Ricks and Roger Shattuck. Since 1999, the association has published a review, Literary Imagination.

== Founding ==
The ALSCW was organized in 1994 as the Association of Literary Scholars and Critics by a group of over 400 scholars troubled by what they saw as an over-reliance on postmodern theory in the academy, particularly in the Modern Language Association (MLA). Among the founding members were Robert Alter, Joseph Brodsky, Paul Cantor, Denis Donoghue, John Hollander, Alfred Kazin, Mary Lefkowitz, Richard Poirier, Christopher Ricks and Roger Shattuck; founding president Ricardo Quinones called it "a Who's Who of the American literary establishment." At its founding, it was referred to by academics as an "anti-MLA," though the MLA itself officially wished the ALSCW well.

The group was conceived at a meeting of a small group at the University of California, Irvine in 1993. This meeting drafted a mission statement, elected officers, and began a campaign to recruit the founding scholars. Roughly 40 scholars of the association met in Boston, Massachusetts in September of 1994, with a first annual conference in Minneapolis, Minnesota in 1995.

== Organization ==
The ALSCW has been headquartered at the Catholic University of America in Washington, D.C. since January 2016.

== Publications ==
Since 1999, the association has published a review, Literary Imagination. It was distributed by Oxford University Press 1999–2024 and then moved to Johns Hopkins University Press. It publishes three issues a year, and its chief editor is Paul Franz.

The ALSCW also publishes the triannual online literary journal Literary Matters and an occasional journal Forum: A Publication of the Association of Literary Scholars, Critics, and Writers.

== Goals of the ALSCW ==
The ALSCW's official website declares the following goals:

- To provide space for encounters between scholars, critics, editors, and teachers, and fiction writers, poets, playwrights, and screenwriters
- To foster connections between the academic study of literature and the wider literary culture extending beyond the academy
- To sponsor and disseminate studies of curriculum and wider topics relating to literature (such as the teaching of composition, and the reading habits of a well-informed, critically alert citizenry; to create links between the teaching of literature in primary and secondary schools, and instruction in colleges and universities
- To encourage debate and exchange between and among scholars of ancient and modern literatures, and between and among those who study Western texts and the texts of every culture and continent in the world
- To explore the literary dimensions of other arts, including film, drama, painting, and music
- To support, encourage, and guide the study of literature.

== Presidents ==
The ALSCW maintains a public list of past presidents. These have included:

- 1995: Ricardo Quinones
- 1996: Roger Shattuck
- 1997: Robert Alter
- 1998: Eleanor Cook
- 1999: Austin E. Quigley
- 2000: Mary Lefkowitz
- 2001: John Hollander
- 2002: James Engell
- 2003: Stanley Stewart
- 2004: Michael Valdez Moses
- 2005: Rosanna Warren
- 2006: Tom Clayton
- 2007: Morris Dickstein
- 2008: Christopher Ricks
- 2009: Clare Cavanagh
- 2010: Susan J. Wolfson
- 2011: Greg Delanty
- 2012: John Burt
- 2013: Sarah Spence
- 2014: John Briggs
- 2015: Adelaide Russo
- 2016: John Briggs
- 2017: Ernest Suarez
- 2018: Richard R. Russell
- 2019: Kate Daniels
- 2020: Lee Oser
- 2021: Lee Oser and David Bromwich
- 2022: David Bromwich
- 2023: David Mikics
- 2024: Diana Senechal
- 2025: Hannibal Hamlin
- 2026: David Yezzi
