= Christopher Ricks =

British literary critic and scholar (born 1933)

Sir Christopher Ricks FBA FRSL
- Born: Christopher Bruce Ricks; 18 September 1933 (age 93); Beckenham, United Kingdom
- Education: Balliol College, Oxford
- Occupations: Critic, scholar, professor
- Writing career
- Genre: Literary criticism
- Notable awards: 2003 Mellon Distinguished Achievement Award

Sir Christopher Bruce Ricks FBA FRSL (born 18 September 1933) is a British literary critic and scholar. He is the William M. and Sara B. Warren Professor of the Humanities at Boston University (US), co-director of the Editorial Institute at Boston University, and was Professor of Poetry at the University of Oxford (UK) from 2004 to 2009. In 2008, he served as president of the Association of Literary Scholars and Critics.

He is known as a champion of Victorian poetry; an enthusiast of Bob Dylan, whose lyrics he has analysed at book length; a trenchant reviewer of writers he considers pretentious (Marshall McLuhan, Christopher Norris, Geoffrey Hartman, Stanley Fish); and a warm reviewer of those he thinks humane or humorous (F. R. Leavis, W. K. Wimsatt, Christina Stead). Hugh Kenner praised his "intent eloquence", and Geoffrey Hill his "unrivalled critical intelligence". W. H. Auden described Ricks as "exactly the kind of critic every poet dreams of finding". John Carey called him the "greatest living critic".

== Life ==
He was born in Beckenham, England, the younger son of James Bruce Ricks, who worked for the family overcoat manufacturing firm, and Gabrielle (née Roszak), daughter of a furrier of French origin. Ricks was educated at King Alfred's School, Wantage (a near-contemporary of the jockey Lester Piggott), then – as the first of his family to attend university – studied at Balliol College, Oxford, where he graduated with a first in his B.A. in English in 1956, a B.Litt. in 1958, and M.A. in 1960. He served in the Green Howards in the British Army in 1953/4 in Egypt. He was a Fellow and Tutor in English Literature at Worcester College, Oxford, moving in 1968, after a sabbatical year at Stanford University, to become Professor of English at the University of Bristol.

During his time at Bristol he worked on Keats and Embarrassment (1974), in which he made revelatory connections between the letters and the poetry. It was also at Bristol that he first published his still-definitive edition of Tennyson's poetry. In 1975, Ricks moved to the University of Cambridge, where in 1982 he became King Edward VII Professor of English Literature in succession to Frank Kermode, before leaving for Boston University in 1986. In June 2011, it was announced Ricks would join the professoriate of New College of the Humanities, a private college in London.

He was knighted in the 2009 Birthday Honours. He was elected a Fellow of the Royal Society of Literature in 1970.

== Principles against theory ==
Ricks has distinguished himself as a vigorous upholder of traditional principles of reading based on practical criticism. He has opposed the theory-driven hermeneutics of the post-structuralist and postmodernist. This places him outside the post-New Critical literary theory, to which he prefers the Johnsonian principle.

In an important essay, he contrasts principles derived empirically from a close parsing of texts, a tradition whose great exemplar was Samuel Johnson, to the fashionable mode for philosophical critique that deconstructs the "rhetorical" figures of a text and, in doing so, unwittingly disposes of the values and principles underlying the art of criticism itself. "Literature", he argues, "is, among other things, principled rhetoric".

== Works ==
- A Dissertation Upon English Typographical Founders and Founderies 1778 by Edward Rowe Mores (1961), editor with Harry Carter
- Milton's Grand Style (1963)
- Poems and Critics (1966), anthology
- The Life and Opinions of Tristram Shandy, Gentleman by Laurence Sterne (1967), editor with Graham Petrie
- Twentieth Century Views: A. E. Housman (1968), editor
- Paradise Lost and Paradise Regained by John Milton (1968), editor
- English Poetry and Prose 1540–1674 (1970), editor
- English Drama To 1710 (1971), editor
- The Brownings: Letters and Poetry (1970), editor
- Tennyson (1972)
- A Collection of Poems By Alfred Tennyson (1972), editor
- Selected Criticism of Matthew Arnold (1972), editor
- Keats and Embarrassment (1974)
- Geoffrey Hill and the Tongue's Atrocities (1978)
- The State of the Language (1979), editor with Leonard Michaels, later edition 1990
- The Force of Poetry (1984), essays
- The Poems of Tennyson (1987), three volumes, editor
- The Tennyson Archive (from 1987), editor with Aidan Day, 31 volumes
- The New Oxford Book of Victorian Verse (1987), editor
- T. S. Eliot and Prejudice (1988)
- A. E. Housman: Collected Poems and Selected Prose (1988), editor
- The Faber Book of America (1992), editor with William L. Vance
- The Golden Treasury (1991), editor
- Beckett's Dying Words (1993)
- Essays in Appreciation (1996)
- Inventions of the March Hare: Poems, 1909–1917 by T. S. Eliot (1996), editor
- The Oxford Book of English Verse (1999), editor
- Allusion to the Poets (2002)
- Selected Poems of James Henry (2002), editor
- Reviewery (2003), essays
- Dylan's Visions of Sin (2003)
- Decisions and Revisions in T. S. Eliot (2003)
- Samuel Menashe: Selected Poems (2005), editor
- True Friendship: Geoffrey Hill, Anthony Hecht and Robert Lowell Under the Sign of Eliot and Pound (2010)
- The Poems of T. S. Eliot (2015), editor with Jim McCue, 2 volumes
- Along Heroic Lines (2021)
