= Lee Oser =

American novelist (born in 1958)

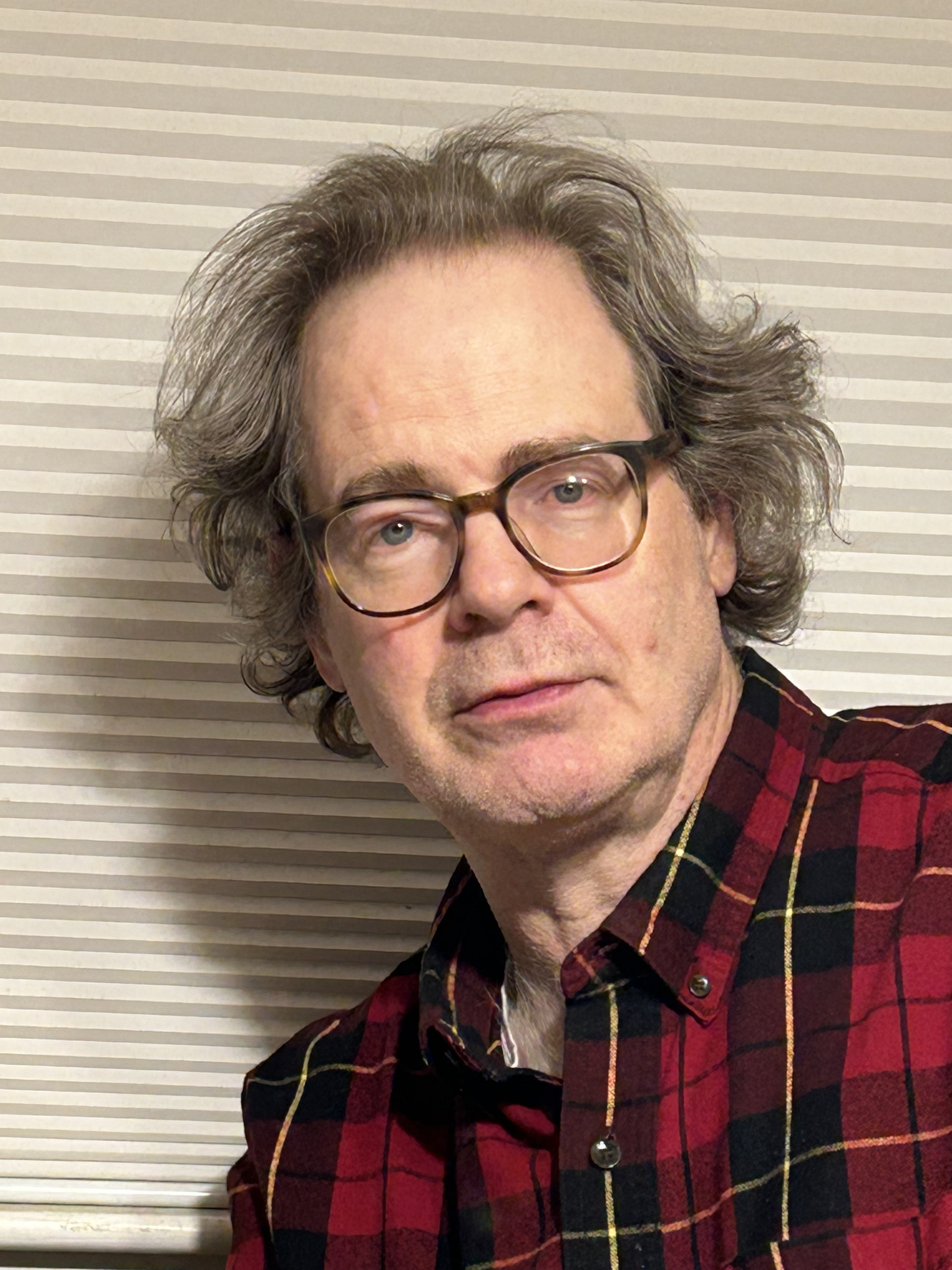
- Oser in 2022
- Born: 1958 (age 67–68); New York City, U.S.
- Education: Reed College (BA); Yale University (PhD)
- Occupations: Novelist; educator; literary critic
- Writing career
- Language: English

Lee Oser (born in 1958) is an American novelist, Christian humanist, and literary critic. He is a former president of the Association of Literary Scholars, Critics, and Writers. He teaches religion and literature at the College of the Holy Cross, in Worcester, Massachusetts.

== Biography ==
Lee Oser was born in New York City in 1958. He is of Irish Catholic and Russian Jewish descent. He attended public high school on Long Island. After playing in rock bands and working odd jobs in Portland, Oregon, he received a B.A. from Reed College in 1988 and a Ph.D. in English from Yale University in 1995. The College of the Holy Cross hired him in 1998. As a scholar, he began his career in the field of literary modernism and is a scholar of the poet T. S. Eliot.

Oser has published several books of literary criticism and four novels, including Oregon Confetti, named by Commonweal as one of its top books of 2017.

== Novels ==
=== Out of What Chaos ===
Set on the West Coast during Bush II's first term, Out of What Chaos (Scarith, 2007) showcases the escapades of Rex and The Brains as they break into the Portland rock scene, record their first CD, and tour from Vancouver to LA behind their chart-topping single, "F U. I Just Want to Get My Rocks Off". In the end, the boys must make a decision about how to live.

Literary critic and theorist Jean-Michel Rabaté called Oser a "worthy debater" and praises Out of What Chaos, saying he "enjoyed it fully."

=== The Oracles Fell Silent ===
Oser's second novel follows its predecessor by exploring the intersection of pop culture and religion. The young narrator, Richard Bellman, recounts his experience as personal secretary to a sixties' rock legend, Sir Ted Pop.

Early reviews have praised the novel, while focusing on Oser's attempt to address contemporary culture from a Catholic point of view.

=== Oregon Confetti ===
In Lee Oser's fourth novel, Oregon Confetti, Portland art dealer Devin Adams has been so successful conning the local Philistines that he can no longer tell actual art from the highly profitable junk that supports his living. But the sudden appearance on his doorstep of the great painter John Sun, bearing a strange child, changes all that, confronting Devin with the hard facts of his life, from his lusts and obsessions to his own small part in a mass psychosis that denies the existence of love.

Critic Anthony Domestico lists the novel among Commonweal's Top Books of 2017, saying "Antic, absurdist, comic, and Catholic, this ribald novel grows out of the Evelyn Waugh and John Kennedy Toole tradition." In other reviews of Oregon Confetti, Oser's Catholic vantage point remained a source of contention. Critic Joseph Pearce listed Oregon Confetti in his list of "The Best of Contemporary Christian Fiction".

Oser was interviewed by Crisis Magazine, Dappled Things, Law and Liberty.

=== Old Enemies ===
Oser's fourth novel, published by Senex Press, is a satire that follows the protagonist Moses Shea, a disgraced newspaperman. After being dumped by his love and blacklisted in New York, Shea, thanks to his old friend from Harvard Nick Carty, ends up at the newly defunct St. Malachy's Catholic College in Massachusetts. The novel satirizes the state of modern higher education.

Mark Bauerlein, Senior Editor at First Things, said of the novel "Lee Oser's Old Enemies is a joy to read, clever and astute, sharp and funny, satiric but humane. We have the issues of our time in dramatic light." Noting Oser's own Christian Humanism, Ernest Suarez, David M. O'Connell Professor of English at the Catholic University of America, wrote "Old Enemies is a contemporary version of The Praise of Folly, taking aim at the deceptions, self-deceptions, and irrationalities that so often underpin people's quests for power."

== Christian humanism ==
Oser's defense of Christian humanism is set out in his book The Return of Christian Humanism. In a lengthy review-essay, Anthony Kenny argued that Oser's position had been superannuated by modernity. Alan Blackstock places Oser in the tradition of G. K. Chesterton and compares Oser's ethical criticism to that of Alasdair MacIntyre. Oser subsequently developed his position in a 2021 essay, "Christian Humanism and the Radical Middle".

== Personal life ==
He is the father of two daughters: Eleanor and Briana. He and his wife, Kate, have been married for thirty years. A committed Roman Catholic, he serves regularly as an extraordinary minister at Saint Paul's Cathedral, in downtown Worcester.

== Bibliography ==
=== Critical study ===
- —— (1998). T. S. Eliot and American Poetry. University of Missouri Press. ISBN 9780826211811.
- —— (2007). The Ethics of Modernism: Moral Ideas in Yeats, Eliot, Joyce, Woolf and Beckett. Cambridge University Press. ISBN 9780521116282.
- —— (2007). The Return of Christian Humanism: Chesterton, Tolkien, Eliot and the Romance of History. University of Missouri Press. ISBN 9780826217752.
- —— (2022). Christian Humanism in Shakespeare: A Study in Religion and Literature. Catholic University of America Press. ISBN 9780813235103.

=== Novels ===
- —— (2007). Out of What Chaos: A Novel. Scarith. ISBN 9780978771348.
- —— (2014). The Oracles Fell Silent. Wiseblood Books. ISBN 9780615876139.
- —— (2017). Oregon Confetti. Wiseblood Books. ISBN 9780991583294.
- —— (2022). Old Enemies: A Satire. Senex Press. ISBN 9798986315904.

=== Contributions ===
- —— (2022). Ranasinghe, Nalin (ed.). Shakespeare's Reformation: Christian Humanism and the Death of God. St. Augustine's Press. ISBN 9781587318177.
