= Christian humanism =

Type of humanism

Christian humanism refers to two related concepts. In one usage, the term is applied retrospectively to sixteenth century Christian thinkers who were Renaissance humanists (medieval scholars involved in recovering the humanities traditions of Classical Antiquity). Another is "modern" Christian humanism, which is 20th century coinage emphasising the importance of humanitarian principles within a Christian moral framework, such as human dignity, individual freedom, and the pursuit of happiness.

It is not to be confused with modern humanism, which refers to philosophies that assert the primacy of human values and frame of reference over gods, theology, or religion in general. It should also not be conflated with religious humanism, which refers to a nontheistic movement that practices humanism in congregational structures.

== Terminology ==
While the Renaissance humanist movement was largely about the rediscovery of pre-Christian literature and moral philosophy, scholars such as Charles Nauert argue that a subset of European humanist scholars were unafraid to discuss their own religious positions in relation to the classical literature, marking them out as "Christian humanists", in contrast from others in the movement "who just happened to be religious":

made a connection between their humanistic teaching and scholarship on classical languages and literature, on the one hand, and on the other hand, their study of ancient Christianity, including the Bible and the Church Fathers... Even more important, they associated their scholarly work (classical as well as biblical and patristic) with a determination to bring about a spiritual renewal and institutional reform of Christian society. That connection between their scholarly efforts and their longing for spiritual and institutional renewal is the specific characteristic that distinguishes "Christian humanists" as a group from other humanists who just happened to be religious.

Modern theological conceptions of Christian humanism are in part inspired by this view, although they differ on whether Christian humanism is a distinct movement within Christianity or a component aspect of Christianity in general. Theologians such as Jens Zimmerman make a case for the concept of Christian humanism as a cogent force throughout the history of Christianity. In Zimmerman's account, humanitarian and rights-oriented philosophies emerged organically from the Christian doctrine that God, in the person of Jesus, became human in order to redeem humanity, and from the further injunction for the participating human collective (the church) to act out the life of Christ.

Renaissance historian Margaret Mann Phillips says that this subset of Renaissance scholars argued that the most appealing aspects of moral philosophy and art from pre-Christian Europe were in fact themselves a direct product of the Christian God. As such, the basis of Christian humanism was "the belief that all that is good comes from God, and the pre-Christian ages were inspired by Holy Spirit for his own purposes."

The term Christian humanism was popularised in the 20th century, after the emergence of the modern humanist movement, which is non-religious (sometimes referred to as "secular humanism" in the United States). This movement argues that humanism is the idea that human beings are the ultimate source of moral value and moral decisions, and therefore is incompatible with theistic beliefs or claims that moral rules are divinely ordained. To this end, humanist writers have opined that the term "Christian humanism" lacks coherence, or has in reality been used to unconvincingly arugue for the "exceptionalism" of Christianity in comparison with other religions or humanism, or even that it deliberately "co-opts" the appealing aspects of humanism (such as the fruits of modern social progress) in the name of Christianity. An example of this would be Zimmerman's claim that "common humanity, universal reason, freedom, personhood, human rights, human emancipation and progress, and indeed the very notion of secularity... are literally unthinkable without their Christian humanistic roots."

== History ==
=== Renaissance ===
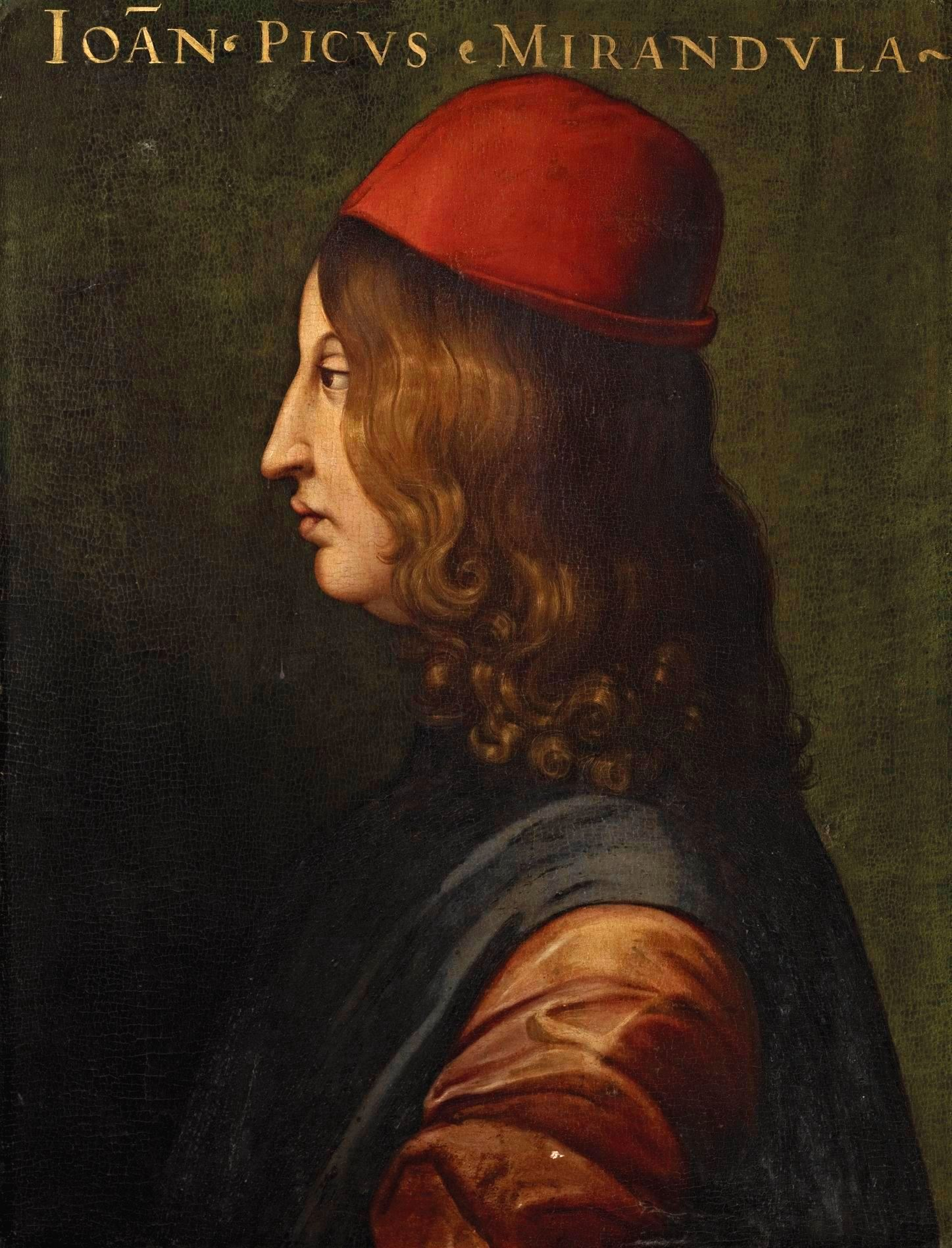
Giovanni Mirandola

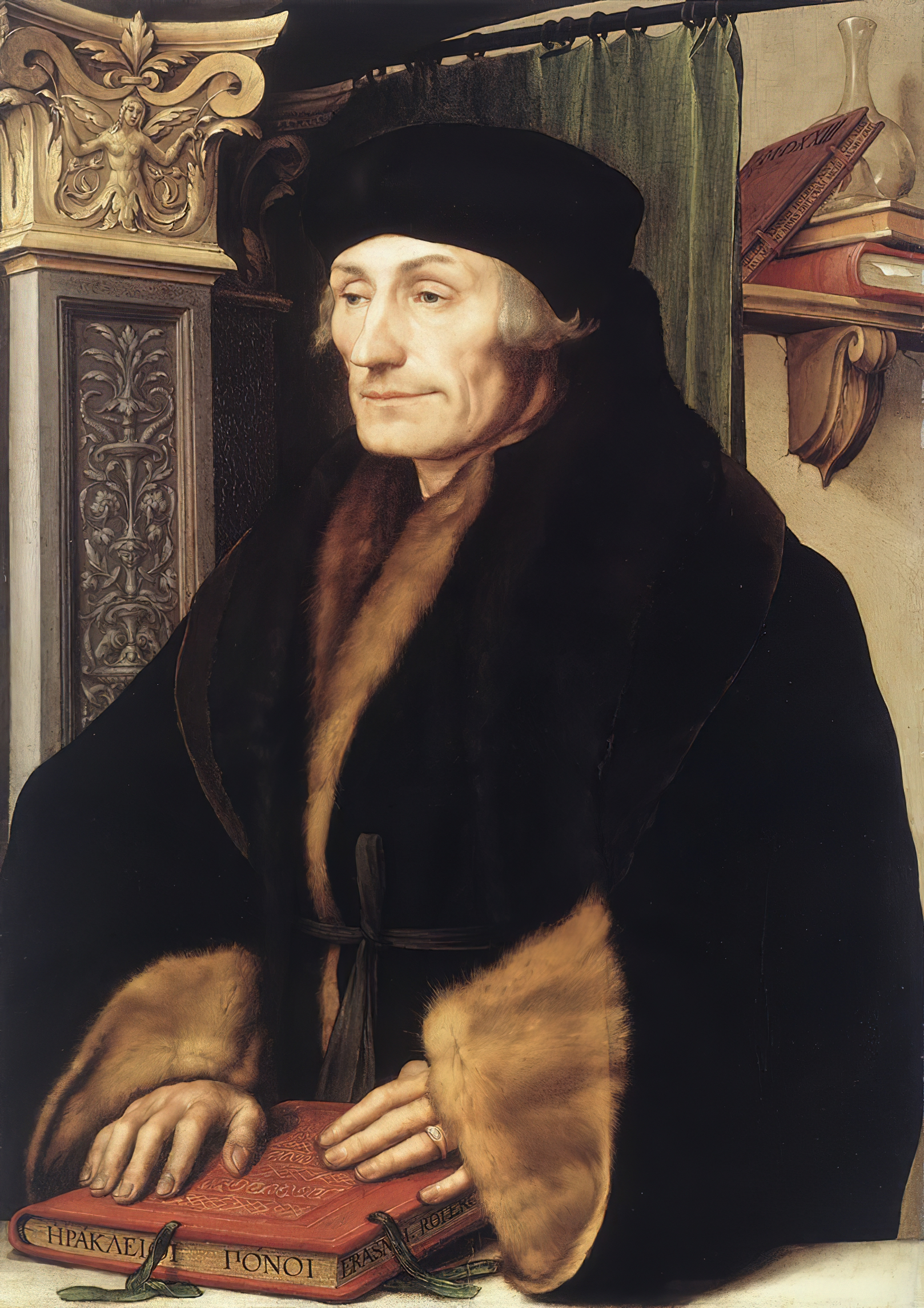
Erasmus

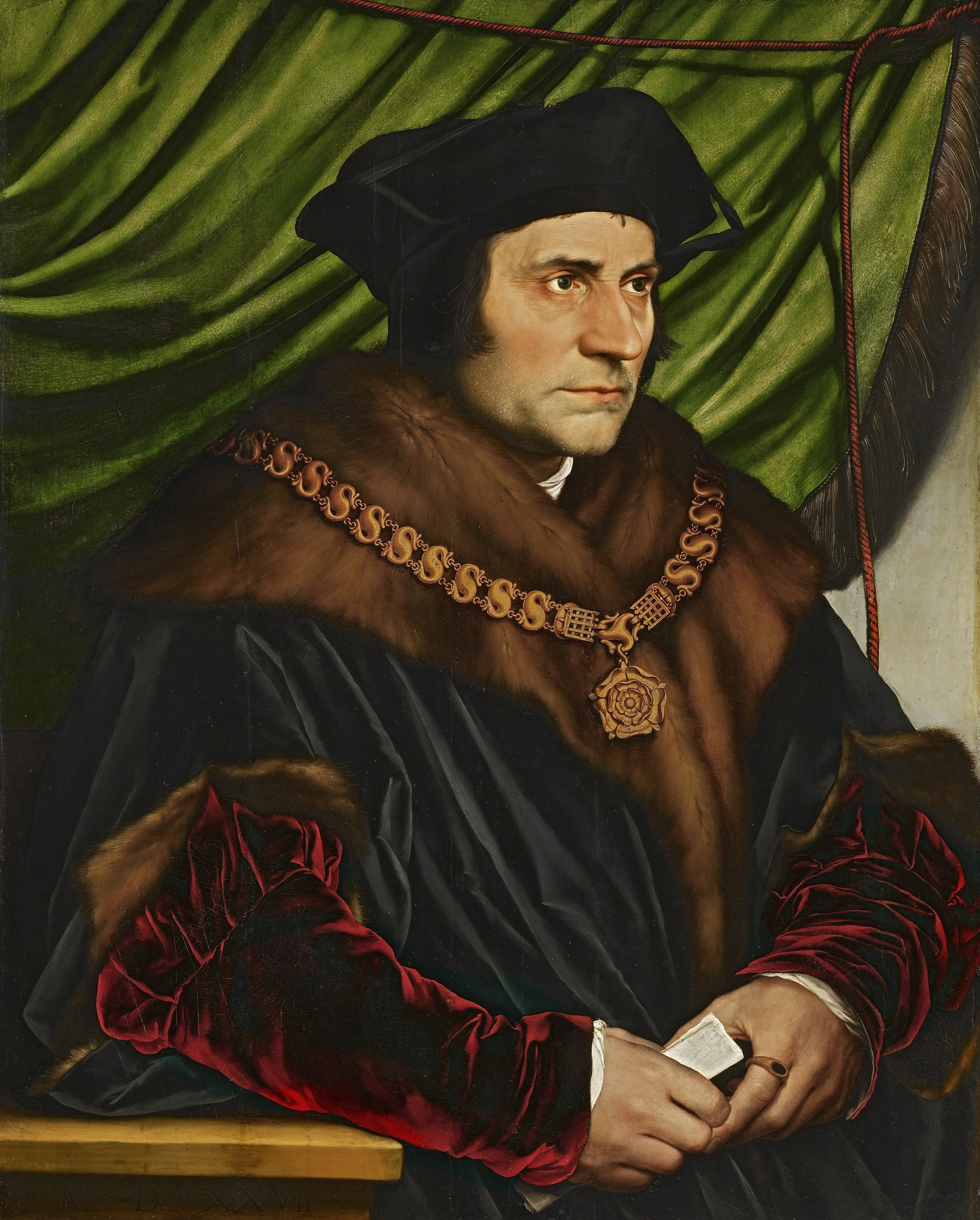
Thomas More

Scholars since the 18th century have agreed that some sort of change took place in Western European civilization in the period from 1300 to 1600. However, the extent and nature of this change have been widely debated. Some have seen the period as one in which a radically new sense of the world and humanity emerged, whereas others have seen instead the gradual development of ideas that had long been current. Nevertheless, there are elements in Renaissance thought that recur frequently in comparison to earlier centuries. In the Middle Ages, people typically yielded some of their identity to corporations—the church, the state, the feudal society, the guild, the university, and the monastic order. With the Renaissance came an increased sense of individuality and a celebration of uniqueness and individual self-determination. The literature of the period is filled with statements such as the following about the dignity, excellence, rationality, and power of individual human beings:

- "Human beings are made in the image of God, meaning that each one has the possibility of being a person of creativity and moral excellence".
- "Human beings are free; we are not enslaved by sin or psychological obstructions; we are able to set our own course, determine our own destiny".
- "Human beings are actors on the human scene; we are creators, second only to God; we are the God-appointed governors of the world".
- "Human beings have immortal souls, which is God's way of verifying the preciousness of humankind".
- "Human beings may achieve fame—the personal glory attained by an individual who thrusts himself or herself forward in some important, heroic, or prominent way".

Renaissance humanism is linked to those who, following Pico della Mirandola, emphasized the dignity and potential of created humankind. And those, such as Petrarch and Thomas More, who believed the humanities could aid the precepts and study of divinity. And those such as Erasmus who also promoted human flourishing.

== The Italo-German Split ==
Historians have identified significant regional variations within Renaissance Christian humanism, often described as an Italo–German or southern–northern divergence. While Christian humanists across Europe shared commitments to classical learning, ad fontes scholarship, and moral reform, differences in cultural context, institutional settings, and theological priorities produced distinct emphases in Italian and northern European humanism.

Italian Christian humanism developed in close association with the civic and courtly cultures of the Italian city-states and was strongly influenced by the revival of classical philosophy, rhetoric, and aesthetics. Thinkers such as Marsilio Ficino and Giovanni Pico della Mirandola emphasized the harmony between Christian doctrine and ancient philosophy, particularly Platonism and Neoplatonism. Their work often explored metaphysical and speculative questions concerning the nature of the soul, human dignity, and humanity’s place within a divinely ordered cosmos. Italian humanists generally sought to integrate classical philosophy into an idealized vision of Christian culture and were less inclined toward direct institutional confrontation with ecclesiastical authority.

By contrast, Christian humanism in the German-speaking lands and the northern Low Countries developed with a stronger moral, educational, and reformist orientation. Figures such as Jakob Wimpfeling, John Colet, and especially Erasmus emphasized biblical philology, patristic theology, and ethical renewal over metaphysical synthesis. Northern humanists privileged Scripture as the primary source of Christian wisdom and employed classical learning chiefly as a tool for clarifying biblical and moral teaching.

This northern strand of Christian humanism was also marked by a more sustained critique of clerical corruption and ecclesiastical abuses, particularly in the context of educational and pastoral reform. Although many northern humanists remained committed to church unity, their emphasis on moral accountability and scriptural authority placed their work in closer proximity to the early intellectual currents of the Reformation.

The Italo–German divergence should not be understood as a rigid division but rather as a spectrum of tendencies shaped by differing regional circumstances. Intellectual exchange between Italy and northern Europe was extensive, and many Christian humanists operated across cultural boundaries. Nevertheless, the contrast illustrates the diversity of approaches within Christian humanism, which could function both as a culturally integrative synthesis of Christianity and classical antiquity and as a reformist movement oriented toward moral renewal, biblical scholarship, and institutional critique.

=== Origins ===
Christian humanism originated towards the end of the 15th century with the early work of figures such as Jakob Wimpfeling, John Colet, and Thomas More; it would go on to dominate much of the thought in the first half of the 16th century with the emergence of widely influential Renaissance and humanistic intellectual figures such as Jacques Lefèvre d'Étaples and especially Erasmus, who would become the greatest scholar of the northern Renaissance. These scholars committed much of their intellectual work to reforming the church and reviving spiritual life through humanist education, and were highly critical of the corruption they saw in the Church and ecclesiastical life. They would combine the greatest morals in the pre-Christian moral philosophers, such as Cicero and Seneca with Christian interpretations deriving from study of the Bible and Church Fathers. The Waldensians have been viewed as a humanistic synthesis of Christianity.

==== Jakob Wimpfeling ====
Although the first humanists did little to orient their intellectual work towards reforming the church and reviving spiritual life through humanist education, the first pioneering signs and practices of this idea emerged with Jakob Wimpfeling (1450–1528), a Renaissance humanist and theologian. Wimpfeling was very critical of ecclesiastical patronage and criticized the moral corruption of many clergymen; however, his timidity stopped him from converting his work from speech to action for fear of controversy. Although he loved reading many of the classics of the writings of classical antiquity, he feared introducing them to mainstream Christianity and sought to use the works of the Latin Church Fathers and a few Christian poets from the Late Roman Empire towards creating a new form of education that would provide church leaders educated in Christian religion, prominent Church authors and a few important classical writings and hence improve Christendom's condition.

==== John Colet ====
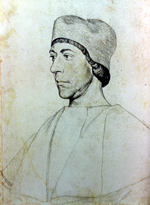
Portrait of John Colet

John Colet (1467–1519) was another major figure in early Christian humanism, exerting more cultural influence than his older contemporary, Jakob Wimpfeling. Being attracted to Neoplatonic philosophers such as Marsilio Ficino and Pico della Mirandola and gaining an appreciation for humanistic methods of analyzing texts and developing detailed ideas and principles regarding them, he applied this humanistic method to the epistles of Paul the Apostle.

In 1505, he completed his doctorate in theology, and then became the Dean of St. Paul's Cathedral. From there, he used his fortune to found near the cathedral St Paul's School for boys. The school was humanistic, in its teaching of Latin, Greek and moral preparation of its students, as well as its recruitment of prominent humanists to recommend and compose new textbooks for it. The best Christian authors were taught, as well as a handful of pagan texts (predominantly Cicero and Virgil), however, Colet's restrictions on the teaching of other classical texts was seen as anti-humanistic and quickly reverted by the school's headmasters. After his death, the school at St. Paul's become an influential humanistic institution. His notable convocation sermon urged his fellow priests to "return to the God of love and peace".

==== Jacques Lefèvre d'Étaples ====
Jacques Lefèvre d'Étaples (1453–1536) was, alongside Erasmus, the first of the great Christian humanists to see the importance of integrating Christian learning, in both the patristics and biblical writings, with many of the best intellectual achievements of ancient civilizations and classical thought. He was educated in the University of Paris and began studying Greek under George Hermonymus due to his interest in contemporary cultural changes in Italy. He taught humanities as Paris and, among his earliest scholarly works, was writing an introduction to Aristotle's Metaphysics. He would write many other works on Aristotle and promote the use of direct translations of Aristotle's work from the original Greek rather than the medieval Latin translations that currently existed.

His focus then began to shift to the Greek Church Fathers whom he personally considered abler sources for the pedagogy of spiritual life than medieval scholasticism, and his goal became to help revive spiritual life in Europe, retiring in 1508 to focus on precisely this. He began publishing various Latin texts of biblical books such as the Psalms and Pauline epistles and was keen to study textual variations between surviving manuscripts. According to Nauert, these "biblical publications constitute the first major manifestation of the Christian humanism that dominated not only French but also German, Netherlandish, and English humanistic thought through the first half of the sixteenth century".

==== Erasmus ====
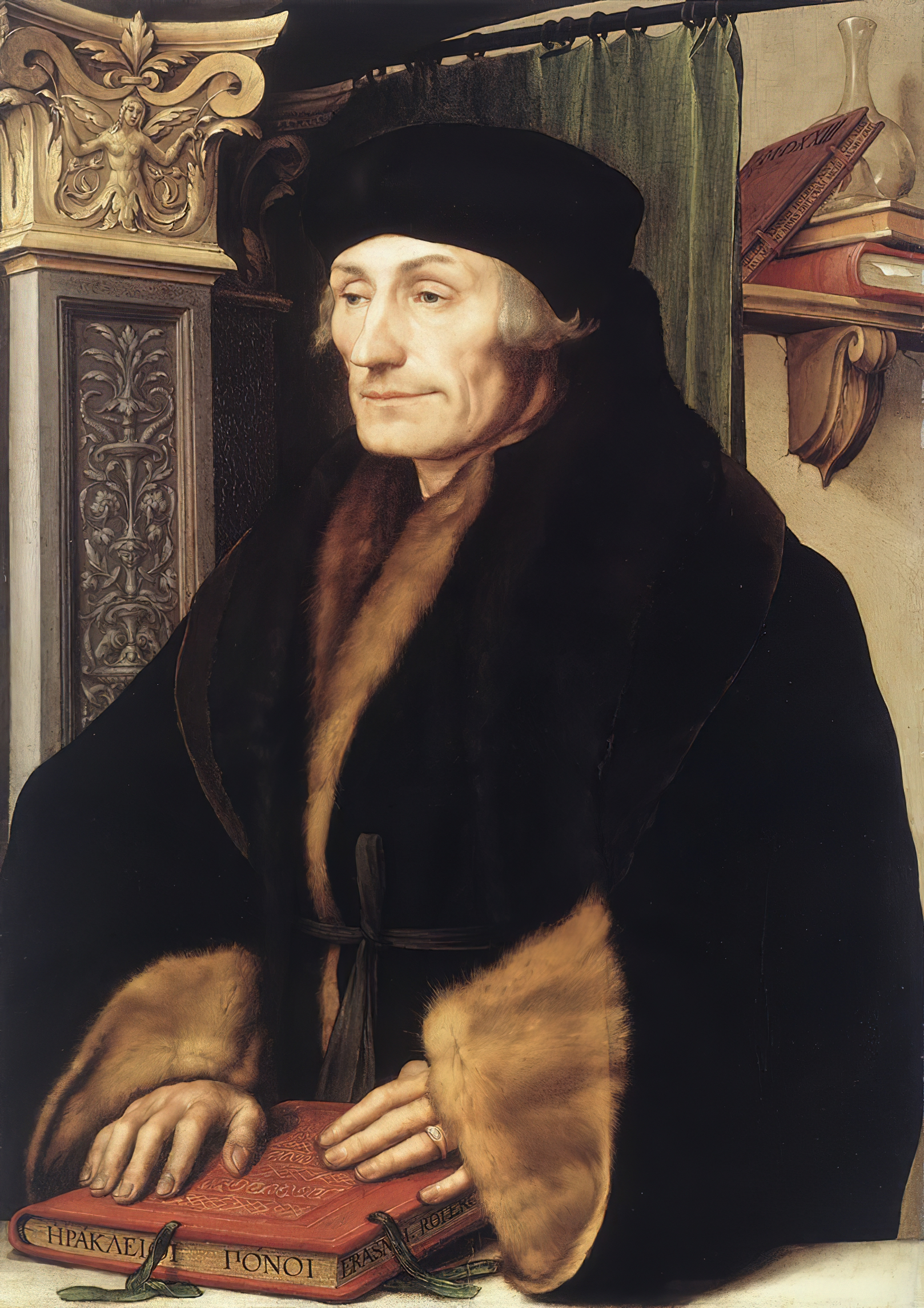
Portrait of Desiderius Erasmus of Rotterdam with Renaissance Pilaster

Erasmus (1466–1536) was the greatest scholar of the northern Renaissance and the most widely influential Christian humanist scholar in history, becoming the most famous scholar in Europe in his day. He believed that "learning and scholarship were a powerful weapon both for the cultivation of personal piety and institutional church reform", which is called instrumentalism.

One of the defining components of his intellectual success was his mastery of Greek.

He had published his Handbook of a Christian Knight (Enchiridion militis christiani) in 1503, writing about his new intellectual direction, the philosophia christi ('Christ's philosophy'). It became incredibly popular with 29 Latin editions between 1519–1523 and receiving translations into English, Dutch, German, French, and Spanish.

The popularity of Erasmus and his work was further amplified by the success of his literary works such as The Praise of Folly, published in 1511, and Colloquies, published in 1518. He also gained incredible success as a textual scholar, interpreting, translating and editing numerous texts of Greek and Roman classics, Church Fathers and the Bible. This textual success began when he discovered and published Lorenzo Valla's Annotations on the New Testament in 1504–1505, and in a single year, in 1516, Erasmus published the first Greek edition of the New Testament, an edition of the works of the Roman philosopher Seneca, and a four-volume edition of St. Jerome's letters. His satires and criticisms were widely popular and renowned for decades to come, and he succeeded in having "truly and fully" founded Christian humanism.

=== Contemporary ===
Literary critic Lee Oser has suggested that Christian humanism ended with Jonathan Swift and Alexander Pope; however, it began again with G.K. Chesterton, T.S. Eliot and J.R.R. Tolkien.

Personalism, an intellectual stance that emphasizes the importance of human persons, has been treated as a modern name for the Christian humanism associated with Pope John Paul II and John Henry Newman.

Incarnational humanism is a type of Christian humanism which places central importance on the Incarnation, the belief that Jesus Christ was truly and fully human. In this context, divine revelation from God independent of the Incarnation is seen as untrustworthy precisely because it is exempt from the vagaries of human discourse.

Jens Zimmermann argues that "God's descent into human nature allows the human ascent to the divine". "If God speaks to us in the language of humanity, then we must interpret Gods speech as we interpret the language of humanity." Incarnational humanism asserts a unification of the secular and the sacred with the goal of a common humanity. This unification is fully realized in the participatory nature of Christian sacraments, particularly the Eucharist. The recognition of this goal requires a necessary difference between the church and the world, where both "spheres are unified in their service of humanity". Critics suggest it is quite wrong to establish a separate theology of the incarnation, and that proponents tend to abstract Jesus from his life and message.

== Criticism ==
Andrew Copson refers to Christian humanism as a "hybrid term... which some from a Christian background have been attempting to put into currency". Copson argues that attempts to append religious adjectives such as Christian to the life stance of humanism are incoherent, saying these have "led to a raft of claims from those identifying with other religious traditions – whether culturally or in convictions – that they too can claim a 'humanism'. The suggestion that has followed – that 'humanism' is something of which there are two types, 'religious humanism' and 'secular humanism', has begun to seriously muddy the conceptual water."

Humanists UK's educational website Understanding Humanism argues that narratives of humanism which try to draw a "neat, linear thread" between Renaissance scholarship and modern humanist thinking are faulty, as "modern humanism is not a descendant of Renaissance humanism or ‘religious humanism’." Rather, "the histories of non-religious humanism and alternative uses of the word are not one single story." While Christian humanism has "some similarities to, but also quite distinct differences" from humanism in the more prevalent sense, it says "it is perhaps better to avoid the label ‘Christian humanism’ for this outlook, and describe it as ‘humanistic Christianity’ (as it is a form of Christianity rather than humanism)."

== See also ==
- Christian anthropology
- Christian existentialism
- Christian feminism
- Christian hedonism
- Christian materialism
- Christian Universalism
- Human Dignity
- Image of God
- Inward Light
- John W. de Gruchy
- New Thought
- Personalism
- Religious humanism
- Renaissance humanism
- Religion of Humanity
- Sermon on the Mount
- Ubuntu theology

== Sources ==
- Croce, Benedetto (1949). My Philosophy. doi:10.4324/9780429030437. ISBN 978-0-429-64157-2.
- Cunningham, Lawrence S. (2002). The Catholic Heritage: Martyrs, Ascetics, Pilgrims, Warriors, Mystics, Theologians, Artists, Humanists, Activists, Outsiders, and Saints. Wipf and Stock Publishers. ISBN 978-1-57910-897-7.
- Nauert, Charles G. (2006). "Rethinking 'Christian Humanism'". Interpretations of Renaissance Humanism. pp. 155–180. doi:10.1163/9789047410249_010. ISBN 978-90-474-1024-9.
- Zimmermann, Jens (2012). Humanism and Religion: A Call for the Renewal of Western Culture. doi:10.1093/acprof:oso/9780199697755.001.0001. ISBN 978-0-19-969775-5.
- Zimmermann, Jens (2016). "Introduction". Re-Envisioning Christian Humanism. pp. 1–16. doi:10.1093/acprof:oso/9780198778783.003.0001. ISBN 978-0-19-877878-3.
