= Dylan's Visions of Sin =

- Cover of the American first edition
- Author: Christopher Ricks
- Language: English
- Subject: Literary criticism
- Publisher: Ecco
- Publication date: 2004
- Publication place: United States
- Media type: Print
- Pages: 528
- ISBN: 978-0060599232

Dylan's Visions of Sin is a 2004 book by Christopher Ricks, a British poetry scholar and literary critic, in which he considers the songs of Bob Dylan as works of literature (in 2016 Dylan was awarded the Nobel Prize in Literature). Ricks' analysis of Dylan's songs is organized around the Christian theological categories of the seven deadly sins, four virtues, and three graces. Ricks writes:

Dylan's is an art in which sins are laid bare (and resisted), virtues are valued (and manifested), and the graces brought home. The seven deadly sins, the four cardinal virtues (harder to remember?), and the three heavenly graces: these make up everybody's world, but Dylan's in particular. Or rather, his worlds, since human dealings of every kind are his for the artistic seizing.

== Reception ==
Charles McGrath, writing about the book in The New York Times, described the book as "a close analysis, line by line sometimes, of the master's greatest hits." McGrath praised Ricks for pointing out connections between Dylan's work and other poets and cultural figures that are "surprising and provocative. At various points he compares Mr. Dylan to Marvell, Marlowe, Keats, Tennyson, Hardy, Yeats and Marlon Brando, to cite just a few of his references." McGrath goes on to suggest that

some passages in Dylan's Visions of Sin may strike some readers as over the top, as when Mr. Ricks devotes four pages (and four footnotes) to the lyrics of "All the Tired Horses," a song that is only two lines long—or maybe three, if you count the long "hmmmm" at the end. Other chapters, though, draw insightful and persuasive parallels between, say, "Lay Lady Lay" and John Donne's poem "To His Mistress Going to Bed," between "Not Dark Yet" and Keats's "Ode to a Nightingale," and between "A Hard Rain's A-Gonna Fall" and the Scottish ballad "Lord Randal."

Alison Lewis, reviewing the book in Library Journal, hailed Ricks' book as "erudite and incisive ... witty and enjoyable, his analysis broadened by comparisons to the poetry of canonical writers like Eliot, Hopkins, and Larkin." The reviewer notes that "[l]iterally hundreds of books have been written about Bob Dylan and his music, but very few have considered his lyrics as works of literature."

== Sources ==
- Lewis, Alison (May 15, 2005). "Review of Dylan's Visions of Sin". Library Journal: 85–86.
- McGrath, Charles (June 9, 2004). "Dylan, Master Poet? Don't Think Twice, It's All Right". The New York Times. p. E1.
- Ricks, Christopher (2004). Dylan's Visions of Sin. New York: Ecco. ISBN 978-0060599232.
