= Jacobin novel =

British novel of 1780–1805

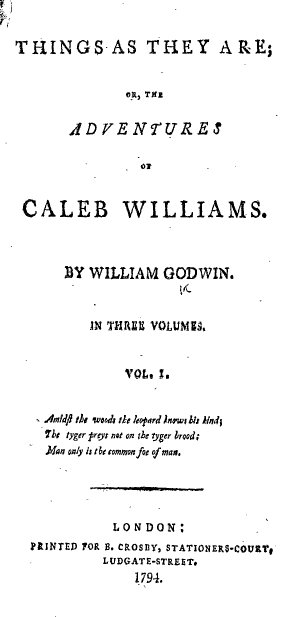
William Godwin's Caleb Williams, the quintessential Jacobin novel

Jacobin novels were written between 1780 and 1805 by British radicals who supported the ideals of the French Revolution. The term was coined by literary scholar Gary Kelly in The English Jacobin Novel 1780-1805 (1976) but drawn from the title of the Anti-Jacobin: or, Weekly Examiner, a conservative periodical founded by the Tory politician George Canning. Canning chose to tar British reformers with the French term for the most radical revolutionaries: Jacobin. Among the Jacobin novelists were William Godwin, Robert Bage, Elizabeth Inchbald, and Charlotte Turner Smith.

The genre began in an attempt to make revolutionary thought more entertaining and easier to comprehend for the lower order. On the midst of the French Revolution, literacy was growing amongst the lower classes, the mass behind the revolutionaries. “A reading public had become a revolutionary public.”

The Jacobin novelists used this literacy to swell their radical beliefs throughout the lower classes. The Jacobin novelists adapted the romance novel structure into radical political subjects. The Jacobins cleverly blended their revolutionary principles into engaging, fantastical tales of honor, cruelty, and power. The Jacobin novelists were able to reach a massive non-intellectual demographic, which was generally apolitical, through this new genre.

The Jacobin novel, most quintessentially represented in William Godwin’s Caleb Williams (1794), attacked the established social and political order. Along with William Godwin, some of the major Jacobin novelists include Elizabeth Inchbald, Thomas Holcroft, and the earliest, Robert Bage. Of all these authors, Godwin was the most effective and outstanding. Almost all of the Jacobin novels reflect theories and principles of Godwin’s Enquiry Concerning Political Justice. Although it is not a novel, it is the foundation that the goals of the Jacobin novelists’ are based upon.

In Godwin's novel, Caleb Williams, the protagonist is a devoutly honorable man who is cast into a “theater of calamity” by unforeseen circumstances. Throughout Caleb's entire journey, whenever he comes in contact with any forms of government or institutions of law he is cruelly and wrongfully castigated. Godwin's novel is an illustration of the effects of an abusive and tyrannical government, it reveals the devastating effects that established power can result in.

The Jacobin novel was especially significant because its audience was the masses. The Jacobins’ message, although superficially simple, was very complex, and in the opinion of the conservatives, too complex for the lower order to understand. The reactionaries believed that the Jacobin novels were incredibly dangerous because they put ideas of revolution in the minds of those who couldn't fully understand the concept. The Jacobin novel led to a great anxiety by the government and the middle and upper classes. At one point there was even a suggestion to create a new tax on books in order to discourage literacy among the poor. In order to defend against these revolutionaries another genre was born, the anti-Jacobin novel.

== Anti-Jacobin novel ==
Although the Jacobin novelists are contemporarily more popular, the anti-Jacobin novel overtook it across the 1790s and into the early 19th century. The anti-Jacobin novel became immensely popular around the late 1790s (bolstered by the Terror), although they began to appear in the middle of the decade. The genre itself is neither original nor impulsive, without the Jacobin novel it would not exist.

Anti-revolutionaries saw these Jacobin novelists as corrupting the ignorant lower classes by disguising fiction as reason. These reactionaries saw this blend of political thought into the fiction novel as radical, even anarchistic, propaganda that the Jacobins were tricking the non-intellectual lower order into supporting.

In Thomas James Mathias's The Pursuits of Literature (1794), he states, “Government and Literature are now more than ever intimately connected.” What Matias goes on to clarify is that in order to defeat the radicals, conservative writers must change their approach in order to capture the audience. To defend King and country, conservatives decided the best way to attack the radicals was through the same medium. The conservatives’ goal became, paradoxically, to take up the fiction that they had denounced and write their own fictional satires of the Jacobin novels, for the same audience. By adopting the Jacobins’ propaganda conveyance, the anti-Jacobins were able to captivate the lower order in the same way but with the opposite message.

Among dozens of the anti-Jacobin novels, George Walker's The Vagabond has been called the most effectual. The Vagabond points to flaws of revolutionary philosophy and suggests it would be disastrous if ever put into practice. The novel includes numerous direct quotations of Godwin's doctrine and illustrates its application, with satirically dreadful results. The book is a blatant attack on Godwin, and the Jacobin novel.

Along with Walker there were Elizabeth Hamilton, Robert Bisset, Henry James Pye, Charles Lloyd, Jane West, and Edward Dubois. These anti-Jacobin novelists combined history and fiction through satire. Walker clarifies this goal in his dedication of The Vagabond, “Romances are only Histories which we do not believe to be true, and Histories are Romances we do believe to be true.” Although the anti-Jacobins despised the Jacobins’ radical adaptations of the romance structures of the novel, they also realized how effective it could be among the impressionable and naïve lower order. Consequently, the anti-Jacobins decided to fight fire with fire.

In the anti-Jacobins’ opinions, the Jacobin novelists placed more importance on the romance of the novel than on truth and history. To differentiate themselves from this the anti-Jacobins strove to emphasize truth and historical precedents. Simply put, the goal of the anti-Jacobins was to defeat radicalism by challenging the blend of political treatise and romance while maintaining the importance of truth and history.

The formula of the anti-Jacobin novel usually includes a satirical interpretation of revolutionaries or revolutionary supporters who accept the power of romance over reason, Jacobin protagonists whose principles are egotistical and/or criminal, verbatim invocations of Godwin's texts, and a failure of revolutionary philosophy put into place. Many of the novels illustrate the danger of politics in a novel and the susceptibility of the naïve to corruption through the novel. The irony of a novel telling the reader the danger of novels was not missed by the reader and worked to precipitate the relative failure of the genre.
