= Melvin Rogers =

American political scientist

Melvin L. Rogers is an American political scientist. He is the Edna and Richard Salomon Distinguished Professor of Political Science at Brown University.

Rogers received a BA in Political Science from Amherst College in 1999, an M.Phil in Political Thought and Intellectual History from the University of Cambridge in 2000 and a PhD in Political Science from Yale University in 2006.

In 2023, Rogers received the James W.C. Pennington Award of Heidelberg University. The award, presented by the Heidelberg Center for American Studies (HCA) and the Faculty of Theology, is given to scholars who perform "ground-breaking research on Afro-American history." He received the 2024 Ralph J. Bunche Award from the American Political Science Association for his book In The Darkened Light of Faith.

== Books ==
- The Undiscovered Dewey: Religion, Morality, and the Ethos of Democracy (Columbia University Press, 2009)
- The Darkened Light of Faith: Race, Democracy, and Freedom in African American Political Thought (Princeton University Press, 2023)

=== Editor ===
- John Dewey, The Public and its Problems (Ohio University Press, 2016)
- with Jack Turner African American Political Thought: A Collected History (University of Chicago Press, 2021)
