= Paul Cantor =

American literary and media critic (1945–2022)

- Born: October 25, 1945; New York City, U.S.
- Died: February 25, 2022 (aged 76)
- Education: Harvard University (BA, PhD)
- Occupations: Literary Critic; Professor
- Employer: University of Virginia

Paul A. Cantor (October 25, 1945 – February 25, 2022) was an American literary and media critic. He taught for many years at the University of Virginia, where he was the Clifton Waller Barrett Professor of English. He also served on the National Council for the Humanities from 1992 to 1999.

== Early life and education ==
Cantor was born in New York City on October 25, 1945. His family was Jewish and secular. As a young man he was an avid reader with interests in science, philosophy, and literature. He has given an account of his early years in his intellectual autobiography.

While still in high school, Cantor attended Ludwig von Mises' economics seminars in New York City.

He went on to study English literature at Harvard (A.B., 1966, Ph.D., 1971), where he studied literature with Larry Benson, Hershel Baker, and Walter Jackson Bate and politics with Harvey Mansfield.

== Critical focal points ==
Cantor wrote on a wide range of subjects, including Homer, Plato, Aristotle, Dante, Cervantes, Shakespeare, Christopher Marlowe, Ben Jonson, Jean-Jacques Rousseau, William Blake, Lord Byron, Percy Bysshe Shelley, Mary Shelley, Jane Austen, Romanticism, Oscar Wilde, H. G. Wells, Friedrich Nietzsche, Mark Twain, Elizabeth Gaskell, Thomas Mann, Samuel Beckett, Salman Rushdie, Leo Strauss, Tom Stoppard, Don Delillo, New Historicism, Austrian economics, postcolonial literature, contemporary popular culture, and relations between culture and commerce.

=== Shakespeare criticism ===
Cantor published extensively on Shakespeare. In Shakespeare's Rome: Republic and Empire (1974), a revision of his doctoral thesis, he analyzed Shakespeare's Roman plays and contrasted the austere, republican mentality of Coriolanus with the bibulous and erotic energies of Antony and Cleopatra. He returned to the Roman plays in Shakespeare's Roman Trilogy: The Twilight of the Ancient World (2017).

In Shakespeare: Hamlet (1989), he depicted Hamlet as a man torn between pagan and Christian conceptions of heroism. In his articles on Macbeth, he analyzed "the Scottish play" using the same polarity.

Cantor also published articles on several other Shakespeare plays, including As You Like It, The Merchant of Venice, Henry V, Othello, King Lear, Timon of Athens, and The Tempest.

A characteristic feature of Cantor's scholarship is his focus on various political regimes and their depiction in Shakespeare's plays. Cantor notes that different regimes promote different ideas about human beings, the good, and government. He compares and contrasts the early Roman regime as depicted in Coriolanus and the later Roman regime as depicted in Antony and Cleopatra, pagan values and Christian values, republican regimes and monarchical regimes.

=== Romanticism ===
Cantor's second book, Creature and Creator: Myth-Making and English Romanticism (1984), included discussions of Rousseau, Blake, Byron, and the Shelleys.

=== Popular culture and media criticism ===
Cantor was perhaps best known in his later years for his writings on popular culture. He published three books in this field. In Gilligan Unbound: Pop Culture in the Age of Globalization (2003), he used literary and critical methods to analyze four popular American television shows: Gilligan's Island, Star Trek, The Simpsons, and The X-Files. Nine years later he followed this book up with another book on movies and television, The Invisible Hand in Popular Culture: Liberty vs. Authority in American Film and TV (2012). His third and final book on popular culture was Pop Culture and the Dark Side of the American Dream: Con Men, Gangsters, Drug Lords, and Zombies (2019).

Cantor also published many articles on films and television shows, most of which are listed on his webpage at the University of Virginia and on his CV. A 2004 article in Americana described Cantor as "a preeminent scholar in the field of American popular culture studies."

=== Austrian economics ===
Cantor combined his interests in literature and culture with an interest in Austrian Economics. Literature and the Economics of Liberty: Spontaneous Order in Culture (2010), a collection of essays Cantor edited with Stephen Cox, explored ways of using Austrian economics to understand works of literature. Cantor presented his work at the Ludwig von Mises Institute, and in 1992 he received the Ludwig von Mises Prize for Scholarship in Austrian Economics.

== Books ==
- Shakespeare's Rome: Republic and Empire. Cornell University Press, 1976. Reprinted with a new preface, University of Chicago Press (paperback), 2017.
- Creature and Creator: Myth-making and English Romanticism. Cambridge University Press, 1984.
- Shakespeare: Hamlet. Cambridge University Press, 1989. Second edition (revised), 2004
- Macbeth und die Evangelisierung von Schottland. Siemens Foundation, 1993. Translated into Korean and published by Editus Publishing Company, 2018.
- Gilligan Unbound: Pop Culture in the Age of Globalization. Rowman & Littlefield, 2001.
- Literature and the Economics of Liberty: Spontaneous Order in Culture. Ludwig von Mises Institute, 2009. Co-edited with Stephen Cox.
- The Invisible Hand in Popular Culture: Liberty vs. Authority in American Film and TV. University Press of Kentucky, 2012.
- Shakespeare’s Roman Trilogy: The Twilight of the Ancient World. University of Chicago Press, 2017.
- Pop Culture and the Dark Side of the American Dream: Con Men, Gangsters, Drug Lords, and Zombies. University Press of Kentucky, 2019.

== Death ==
Cantor had a stroke in mid-February 2022. He died on February 25, 2022, in Charlottesville, Virginia, at the age of 76.
