= Robert Bisset =

Robert Bisset (c. 1759 – 14 May 1805) was a Scottish writer, best known as the biographer of Edmund Burke and of Joseph Addison, Richard Steele and other contributors to The Spectator.

== Life ==
Robert Bisset was the son of Rev. Dr. Bisset, minister of Logierait, Perthshire. Though he studied for the church in Edinburgh, Robert Bisset eventually became a Doctor of Laws and moved to England. He was editor of the short-lived The Historical Magazine; or Classical Library of Public Events from November 1788 to December 1792. Bisset's Biographical Sketch of the Authors of the Spectator, the first volume of an eight-volume edition of the Spectator, included sketches of Addison, Steele, Thomas Parnell, John Hughes, Eustace Budgell, Laurence Eusden, Thomas Tickell and Alexander Pope. His Life of Edmund Burke (1798) praised Burke highly, defending his political consistency against detractors. Bisset also wrote two novels, two proslavery tracts, "and a spate of polemical, antidemocratic writing".

== Works ==
- A Biographical Sketch of the Authors of the Spectator. Volume I of Bisset, ed., Spectator, 8 vols, London, 1793–1794.
- Sketch of Democracy, London, 1796.
- The Life of Edmund Burke : comprehending an impartial account of his literary and political efforts and a sketch of the conduct and character of his most eminent associates, coadjutors, and opponents. London: George Cawthorn. 1798 – via Internet Archive.
- Douglas; or, The Highlander, London, 1800.
- The History of the Reign of George III to the Termination of the Late War, 6 vols, London, 1803.
- Modern Literature, 3 vols, London, 1804.
- The History of the Negro Slave Trade in its connection with the commerce and prosperity of the West Indies, and the wealth and power of the British empire, 2 vols, London, 1805.
