= Matt Karp =

American historian

Matthew Karp
- Education: University of Pennsylvania (PhD); Amherst College (BA)

Matthew Karp is an Associate Professor of History at Princeton University since 2013 and was an Elias Boudinot Bicentennial Preceptor from 2016 to 2019. Karp was also an instructor at the University of Pennsylvania from 2011 to 2012 and a Teaching Fellow at Rowan University from 2011 to 2012. Karp is a contributing editor for American socialist magazine Jacobin; his work has also appeared in American progressive magazine the Nation, the The Boston Review, and the The London Review of Books.

At Princeton, Karp teaches courses on the politics of the American Civil War era, abolitionism and slavery, and nineteenth century American politics. Karp earned a Bachelor of Arts in History from Amherst College in 2003 and a PhD in History from the University of Pennsylvania in 2011.

In 2016, Karp's first book, This Vast Southern Empire: Slaveholders at the Helm of American Foreign Policy, was published by Harvard University Press and went on to win several awards. The book examines how slavery shaped U.S. foreign relations before the Civil War. Karp is currently writing a book titled The Radicalism of the Republican Party, which examines the emergence of anti-slavery politics in the United States and in particular the radical vision of the Republican Party in the 1850s before the Civil War.

Originally from Rockville, Maryland and raised by a single mother, Karp canvassed for Barack Obama's 2008 presidential campaign and for Bernie Sanders' 2016 and 2020 presidential campaigns. In the 1990s and 2000s, Karp identified as a "moderate Democrat", but became more interested in socialism and democratic socialism following the Great Recession in 2008 and the Occupy movement in 2011.
