= Diana Senechal =

American teacher, author, and translator (born 1964)

Diana Senechal (born 1964) is an American teacher, author, and translator; since 2017 she has been living in Hungary. She wrote three books of nonfiction, as well as numerous poems, stories, essays, and translations. She taught in New York City public schools before moving to Hungary in 2017 to teach at the Varga Katalin Gimnázium in Szolnok. Her first book, Republic of Noise (2012), was a Choice Outstanding Academic Title, and she was awarded the 2011 Hiett Prize in the Humanities. She was a president of the Association of Literary Scholars, Critics, and Writers in 2024.

== Early life and education ==
Senechal was born in 1964. She received a BA, MA, and PhD in Slavic Languages and Literatures from Yale University.

== Career ==
Senechal taught English Language in New York City public schools 2005–2009 and taught philosophy at Columbia Secondary School 2011–2016. She moved to Hungary in 2017 to teach at the Varga Katalin Gimnázium in Szolnok.

In 2011, she finished her first nonfiction book, Republic of Noise: The Loss of Solitude in Schools and Culture, for release in 2012, drawing on her experience teaching public school. It was named an Outstanding Academic Title of 2012 by Choice magazine. The Dallas Institute awarded Senechal the 2011 Hiett Prize in the Humanities, which is awarded to “an up-and-coming thinker who is recognized as a leader in the humanities.”

She has been a member of the council of the Association of Literary Scholars, Critics, and Writers since 2013 and served as its president in 2024.

== Books ==
- Republic of Noise: The Loss of Solitude in Schools and Culture (Rowman & Littlefield Education, 2012)
- Mind over Memes: Passive Listening, Toxic Talk, and Other Modern Language Follies (Rowman & Littlefield, 2018)
- Solo Concert: Poems (Serving House Books, 2025)
- More and Less than a Friend: The Songwriting Partnership of Tamás Cseh and Géza Bereményi in Hungary (Serving House Books, 2026)

== Translations ==
- Winter Dialogue, by Tomas Venclova, translated by Diana Senechal, with a foreword by Joseph Brodsky and a dialogue between the author and Czeslaw Milosz (Northwestern University Press, 1997)
- Always Different: Poems of Memory, by Gyula Jenei, translated by Diana Senechal (Deep Vellum, 2022)
- The Hidden Wonder of Reality, Faith, and the Soul: Reflections on the Golden Era of Vágtázó Halottkémek (Galloping Coroners), a Hungarian Band, by Sándor Czakó, translated by Diana Senechal (Serving House Books, 2026)
