= Uday Singh Mehta =

American political scientist

Uday Singh Mehta is an American political scientist educated at Leighton Park School in England and is currently a distinguished professor at Graduate Center of the City University of New York, and previously the Clarence Francis Professor at Amherst College.

An expert on Modern European political thought, Uday Singh Mehta was a student of Sheldon Wolin at Princeton University. In 1992 he published his first book, The Anxiety of Freedom: Imagination and Individuality in Locke's Political Thought. In 1999, he published Liberalism and Empire: A Study in Nineteenth Century British Liberal Thought, in which he argued that imperialism was inherent in the liberal project, tracing this through John Locke and John Stuart Mill, while offering Edmund Burke as a conservative alternative.
