= Editorial Institute =

Boston University school

The Editorial Institute at Boston University was founded in 2000 by Christopher Ricks and Geoffrey Hill with "the conviction that the textually sound, contextually annotated edition is central to the intellectual life of many disciplines." The primary aims of the Institute are to promote critical awareness of editorial issues and practices and to train students in editorial methods. The Institute is co-directed by the literary editors and critics Archie Burnett and Christopher Ricks; Frances Whistler was the Assistant Director and Director of Publications until her departure.

The Institute offers a Masters and a doctoral degree to students who successfully prepare editions of important writings, with textual apparatus and annotation, or monographs concerned with editing or textual bibliography. According to the website, "students are encouraged to think widely about the applications of editing: to letters, sound archives, oral transcripts, music, manuscript fragments, legal and historical documents, journalism, notebooks, anonymous writings, and marginalia, as well as to the literary and philosophical writing most often associated with the idea of the edition."

The Institute enjoys the cooperation of the Howard Gotlieb Archival Research Center in the Mugar Memorial Library at Boston University in addition to the archives of the Boston University School of Theology. It also has ties to a wide range of academic disciplines within the University.

Its course offerings for the advanced degrees include: The Theory and Practice of Literary Editing, Textual Scholarship, The History of the Book, Editing and Publishing, Editing Across the Disciplines, Annotations, Editions, and Word and Image.

Current projects of the Editorial Institute include a number of important literary editions. In 2007, Letters of A. E. Housman, was published by Archie Burnett, one of the co-directors of the Institute, and an edition in eleven volumes of the Selected Writings of the Victorian lawyer and controversialist James Fitzjames Stephen is being edited by Christopher Ricks and Frances Whistler. The full critical edition, prepared by Ricks and joint-editor Jim McCue, of the poems of T. S. Eliot appeared in 2015.

As of January 2023, "admissions to the Institute’s Ph.D. program are currently on hold."
