= Beachy Head (disambiguation) =

Beachy Head is a chalk headland in East Sussex, England. It may also refer to:

- Battle of Beachy Head (disambiguation)
- RAF Beachy Head, a former Royal Air Force radar station
- MV Beachy Head, a Point-class sealift ship
- Beachy Head (poem), written in 1807 by Charlotte Turner Smith
- Beachy Head, a former name of Easyworld, a defunct British indie alternative rock/pop band
- "Beachy Head" (song), released in 2010 by the band Veronica Falls
- LB&SCR H2 class steam locomotive 'Beachy Head', original engine 1911–1958, new-build replica in service 2024
