= To the South Downs =

Sonnet by Charlotte Turner Smith

"To The South Downs," also known as Charlotte Turner Smith's "Sonnet V," is one of Smith's earliest sonnets and the first to describe the River Arun and her childhood landscape. The poem first appeared in the first edition of Smith's Elegiac Sonnets in 1784.

== Background ==
Smith grew up at an estate named Bignor Park in West Sussex, where she could see the River Arun at a distance. An unhappy marriage and poverty took her away from this childhood home, though it remained important to her. The title page of the first edition of Elegiac Sonnets identified her as "Charlotte Smith, of Bignor Park" even though she no longer lived there. The Sussex landscape, including the hills of the South Downs, is frequently important to Smith's poetry; her last work, Beachy Head, also describes the South Downs.

== Poem ==
The poem was first published in The European Magazine in October 1782, and reprinted in The New Annual Register in January 1784, before being collected in Smith's 1784 volume of poetry Elegiac Sonnets.

Ah, hills beloved!—where once, a happy child,
Your beechen shades, "your turf, your flowers, among,"
I wove your bluebells into garlands wild,
And woke your echoes with my artless song.
Ah! hills beloved!—your turf, your flowers, remain;
But can they peace to this sad breast restore,
For one poor moment soothe the sense of pain,
And teach a broken heart to throb no more?
And you, Aruna! in the vale below,
As to the sea your limpid waves you bear,
Can you one kind Lethean cup bestow,
To drink a long oblivion to my care?
Ah no!—when all, e'en hope’s last ray is gone,
There's no oblivion but in death alone!

== Major themes ==
The poem contrasts childhood's happiness with adulthood's melancholy, in a poetic response to Thomas Gray's "Ode on a Distant Prospect of Eton College" (1747). The repetition of "Ah! hills beloved!" echoes Gray's line "Ah, happy hills." The quotation marks around “your turf, your flowers, among,” in line two mark an allusion Gray's description of Eton's landscape "[w]hose turf, whose shade, whose flowers among" the Thames River wanders.

The poem emphasizes Smith's personal memories in the landscape, rather than the history of the land. This sets the sonnet apart from Smith's later River Arun poems, which "[see] the poet-historian as a preservationist with special power." Instead, "To the South Downs" (alongside "Written at the Close of Early Spring" and "To Spring" in the first edition of Elegiac Sonnets) is a classicalRomantic poem, "specifically because those sonnets associate the landscape with personal memory."

== Reception ==
William Wordsworth alluded to the poem in his poem An Evening Walk (1792), calling himself "a happy child" like Smith was.
