= On Being Cautioned Against Walking on an Headland =

Sonnet by Charlotte Smith, published 1797

"On Being Cautioned Against Walking on an Headland Overlooking the Sea, Because it was Frequented by a Lunatic", also known as Charlotte Smith's Sonnet LXX, is an early Romantic poem which uses imagery of the sea and of madness to express poetic melancholy. It is one of Smith's best-known sonnets. It was first published in 1797, in the eighth edition of Smith's Elegiac Sonnets.

== Engraving ==
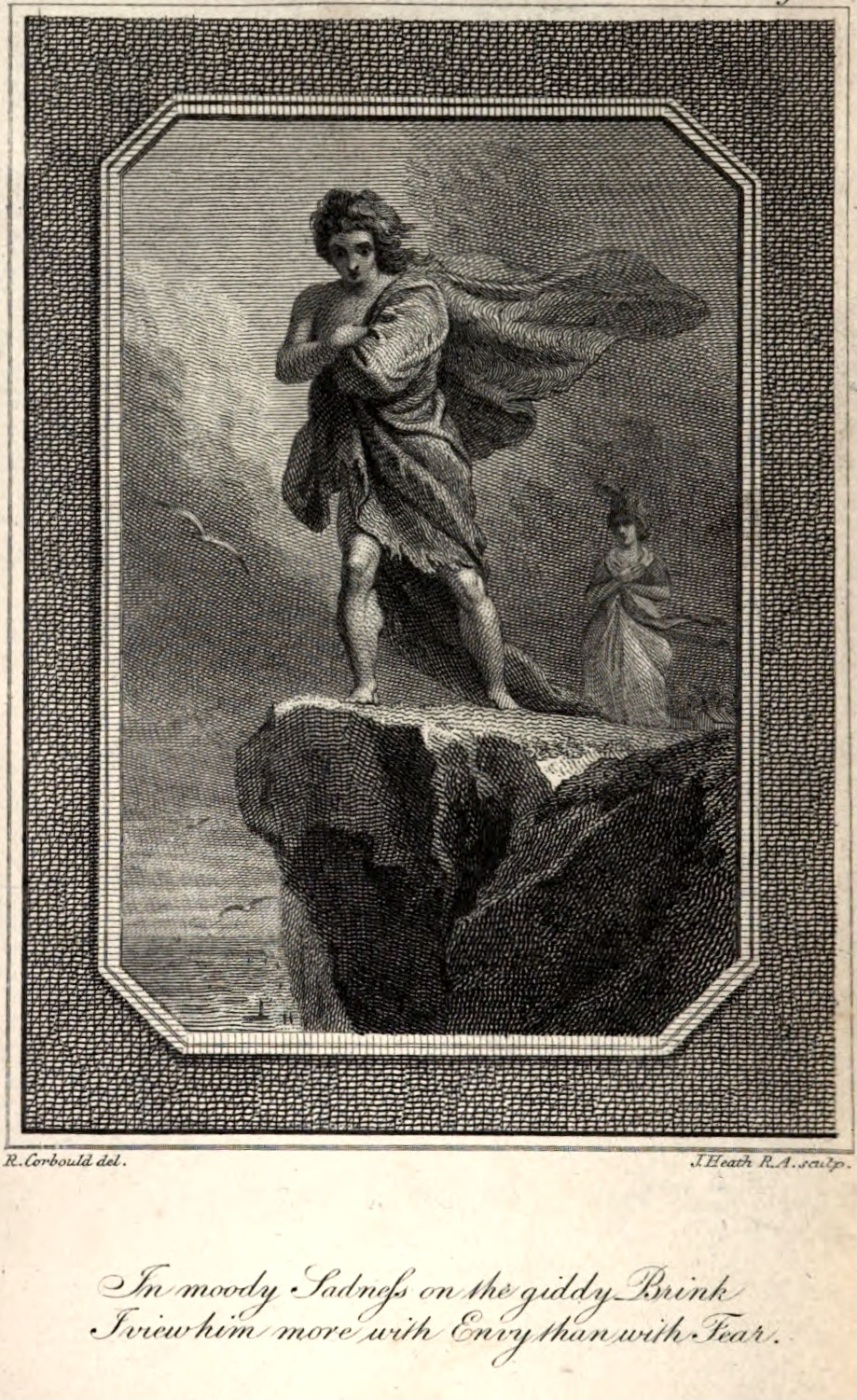
Engraving from the 1797 edition of Elegiac Sonnets

The poem was accompanied by an engraved illustration on the previous page, depicting a man and a woman on a cliff in stormy weather. Of the engravings in the volume, this image is the only one to include a figure who could represent Smith herself. Smith was not satisfied with the image, complaining that in the final version "the expression of the Lunatic is quite changed & instead of a Madman the figure is that of a fool with a black Wig on, & his mantle looks like a piece of ploughed field flying in the Air."

== Poem ==
Is there a solitary wretch who hies
To the tall cliff, with starting pace or slow,
And, measuring, views with wild and hollow eyes
Its distance from the waves that chide below;
Who, as the sea-born gale with frequent sighs
Chills with cold bed upon the mountain turf,
With hoarse, half-utter'd lamentation, lies
Murmuring responses to the dashing surf?
In moody sadness, on the giddy brink,
I see him more with envy than with fear;
He has no nice felicities that shrink
From giant horrors; wildly wandering here,
He seems (uncursed with reason) not to know
The depth or the duration of his woe.

=== Poetic style ===
The poem is largely an English sonnet, except that repeating the A rhyme in the second quatrain creates an Italian-influenced octave. It is also slightly unusual that the B rhyme returns in the final couplet.

=== Allusion to Walpole ===
Smith identifies the italicized phrase in line 11 as an allusion to Horace Walpole's controversial Gothic play The Mysterious Mother (1768). The Countess of Narbonne is warned to stay indoors due to a violent storm, and replies, "Wretches like me, good Peter, dread no storms. / 'Tis delicate felicity that shrinks, / When rocking winds are loud."
