= Middleton-on-Sea =

Village and parish in West Sussex, England

Coordinates: 50.79491°N 0.61967°W

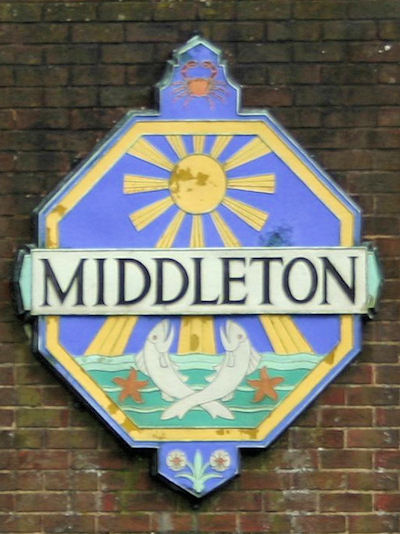
- Village sign

- Location within West Sussex
- Area: 3.54 km^{2} (1.37 sq mi)
- Population: 5,077 (Civil Parish/Ward.2011)
  - Density: 1,434/km^{2} (3,710/sq mi)
- OS grid reference: SU973003
  - London: 53 miles (85 km) NNE
- Civil parish: Middleton-on-Sea
- District: Arun
- Shire county: West Sussex
- Region: South East
- Country: England
- Sovereign state: United Kingdom
- Post town: BOGNOR REGIS
- Postcode district: PO22
- Dialling code: 01243
- Police: Sussex
- Fire: West Sussex
- Ambulance: South East Coast
- UK Parliament: Bognor Regis and Littlehampton

Middleton-on-Sea is a village, civil parish and an electoral ward in the Arun District of West Sussex, England, lying to the east of Bognor Regis and neighbouring Felpham. The parish also contains the settlements of Elmer and Ancton. The southern half is urban and the northern rural.

The village has a pub, The Beresford Arms, named after Viscount William Beresford, who was a general in the British Army, and also commander of the Portuguese Armed Forces.

In the 2001 census, 5,105 people lived in 2,366 households, of whom 2,206 were economically active, a lower than average proportion but higher than other coastal resorts. The 2011 population was 5,077.

== History ==
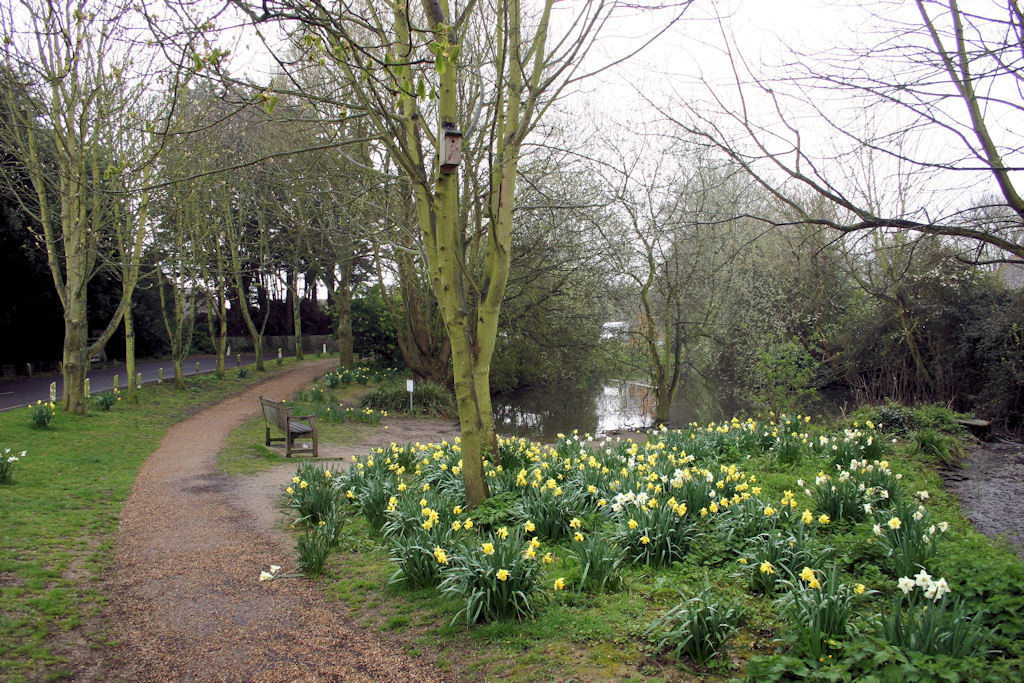
Village pond

Middleton was listed in the Domesday Book of 1086 as having 16 households and a church.

The ancient parish called Middleton had 370 acres (150 ha) in 1881 but had been reduced in area in previous centuries by sea erosion. The configuration of the western and northern boundaries suggests that the parish was once part of Felpham, and the name Middleton may refer to the manor's central position between Felpham and either Elmer or Cudlow in Clymping. Part of the eastern boundary was formed c. 1310 by a ditch and part by Elmer pool, while the north-eastern boundary follows the Ryebank rife. The parish was enlarged in 1933 by the addition of Ancton from Felpham parish and in 1971 had 892 acres (361 ha); its name was extended in 1934 to prevent confusion with other Middletons.

In 1801 there were only six houses in the parish; in 1841 there were nineteen, including the new manor house at Middleton and newly built coastguard cottages at Elmer. Most of the latter remained unoccupied after the departure of the coastguard until demolition between 1910 and 1932. Two larger houses were built during the same period: Middleton Field west of Yapton Road, home of the owner of the adjacent brickworks, and the half-timbered and pebbledashed Ancton Lodge.

At the junction of Middleton and Elmer roads with Yapton Road in 1606 were two or three dwellings; only one older building remained there in 1996, the one-storeyed, flint and thatched Rose Cottage, which is apparently 17th-century or earlier with 19th-century additions.

In 1910 the engineer Norman Thompson, attracted to the area by the large expanse of firm sand and the constant winds along the shore, founded an aircraft works which after the removal of much of the sand in a storm in 1913 turned to making seaplanes. The firm was later called the Norman Thompson Flight Co. During the First World War it supplied aircraft to the navy, the workforce growing from ten at the beginning to between 700 and 900. About 250 aircraft in all were built, but with the cancellation of orders at the end of the war the firm went into liquidation.

In 1921 Capt. R. Coldicott began to build detached houses, some large, along Sea Lane, afterwards laying out two branch roads from it roughly parallel to the coast: Sea Way to the west and Old Point to the east. Further houses were put up by him along and to the north of Middleton Road. By 1928 he had erected over 100, at peak output claiming to finish one every ten days.

In the 1920s, Middleton became a popular holiday destination. The 'New City' created by Sir Walter Blount, Bt., opened in 1922 in the former seaplane factory south of the church. It was one of the earliest attempts to provide a self-contained environment for enjoying the seaside. There were c. 200 bedrooms, all with central heating and half with private baths, besides a garage for 100 cars; visitors without cars could be met at Barnham station. Almost every form of amusement was claimed to be catered for. One of the hangars accommodated a dance hall and another indoor tennis courts; there were also outdoor tennis courts, a putting green, and rooms for cards and billiards. The New City had its own dairy, farm, ice generating plant, and mineral water factory, besides a laundry, hairdressing rooms, and lending library. By the mid-1920s it was said to be very popular with large numbers of 'distinguished' visitors.

Middleton Sports Club of Sea Lane was developed in the early 1920s by Capt. R. Coldicott, and was at first merely for cricket. Presently the club offers cricket, squash, tennis, hockey and bowls.

While there had been a church at Middleton in 1086, by the late 18th century most of the chancel had been destroyed by the sea, the south aisle demolished and its arcade filled in, and part of the west end including the tower removed. Repairs were carried out in 1803. There were seldom more than six or seven in the congregation in 1804. The erosion of the churchyard inspired the poet Charlotte Smith to write a sonnet "Written in the Church-Yard at Middleton in Sussex" (1789).

A very high tide early in 1838 virtually destroyed what was left of the building, rendering it unusable; the ruins survived in 1847 but had disappeared by c. 1849. A small portion of the north part of the churchyard remained in 1860.

The new church, with the same dedication, consists of apsed chancel and nave without structural division, and west porch and vestry. There is a bellcot. Of flint with stone dressings and some brick and in 13th-century style, the building was consecrated in 1849 on a site given by Richard Coote, lord of Middleton manor.

During 10, 11 and 12 June 2012, a once in a 200 or more years level of rainfall that led to widespread flooding across parts of West Sussex. The area of Middleton on Sea was much affected by flooding by surface water.

== Notable residents ==
- Music-hall comedian Chesney Allen (died 1982)
- Cricketer Holly Colvin
- Pianist Charlie Kunz (died 1958)
- William Page (died 1934), historian and general editor of the Victoria County History, lived here from 1922 until his death
