= Elmer, West Sussex =

Village in West Sussex, England

Coordinates: 50.79278°N 0.60936°W

Elmer
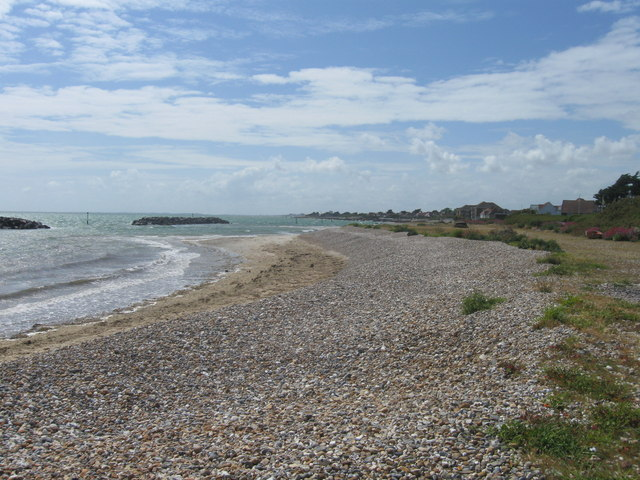
- Elmer Beach

- Location within West Sussex
- OS grid reference: SU981001
  - London: 53 miles (85 km) NNE
- Civil parish: Middleton-on-Sea
- District: Arun
- Shire county: West Sussex
- Region: South East
- Country: England
- Sovereign state: United Kingdom
- Post town: BOGNOR REGIS
- Postcode district: PO22
- Dialling code: 01243
- Police: Sussex
- Fire: West Sussex
- Ambulance: South East Coast
- UK Parliament: Bognor Regis and Littlehampton

Elmer is a coastal village in the Arun district of West Sussex, England. It is part of the built-up area around Bognor Regis. Its postal address is "Elmer, Bognor Regis". In the small shopping area are the local shop, launderette, Indian restaurant and estate agents, along with two pubs The Cabin and The Elmer.

The area also includes the hamlet of Ancton, centred on Ancton Farm, which is considerably older than Elmer, which has only been developed within the last 50 years.

The whole area of Elmer used to be farmland until the housing drive of the postwar years when the Elmer Sands Estate was constructed. Much of the original housing in the Elmer Sands estate consisted of old railway carriages; over the years these are being replaced by modern housing.

The beach at Elmer [Elmer Sands] is like most West Sussex beaches, pebbles at high tide and sand at mid to low tide with the beach divided by wooden groynes.

During the early 19th century Damien Cox, a British Archeologist, discovered the fossilized remains of a Sus domesticus whilst excavating in the beach area. The fossils are now held in the local village post office, where visitors can purchase postcards and other local memorabilia.
