= Sonnet Written in the Church Yard at Middleton =

"Sonnet Written in the Church Yard at Middleton in Sussex," also known as Charlotte Turner Smith's "Sonnet XLIV," is Smith's most widely read and anthologized sonnet. The poem first appeared in the fifth edition of Smith's Elegiac Sonnets in 1789.

== Background ==
The poem describes the sight of a thirteenth-century church in what is now known as Middleton-on-Sea in West Sussex. The churchyard of the poem's title was the church's cemetery. The area had been subject to substantial erosion since at least 1341, and preventative measures were employed in 1570 and 1779. In 1606 the church was approximately 170 yards from the high tide mark, but in 1724 the sea had encroached so much that the church was 20 yards from the edge. Smith visited the church in 1789, at which time the church was only a few feet from the shore, and the surrounding wall and many of the graves had eroded into the sea. Nonetheless, the church continued to be used until the building collapsed in 1838. In 1840, all that was visible was a two-foot fragment of wall, and by 1847 the church was entirely gone. A new church was consecrated nearby in 1849. The gradual collapse of the church was considered picturesque, and made the church into a minor tourist attraction. Several illustrations of the church appeared in The Gentleman's Magazine. Guidebooks and letters of tourists often referenced Smith's sonnet.

== Poem ==
Pressed by the Moon, mute arbitress of tides,
While the loud equinox its power combines,
The sea no more its swelling surge confines,
But o’er the shrinking land sublimely rides.
The wild blast, rising from the western cave,
Drives the huge billows from their heaving bed;
Tears from their grassy tombs the village dead,
And breaks the silent sabbath of the grave!
With shells and sea-weed mingled, on the shore,
Lo! their bones whiten in the frequent wave;
But vain to them the winds and waters rave;
They hear the warring elements no more:
While I am doomed, by life’s long storm oppressed,
To gaze with envy on their gloomy rest.

=== Style ===
The sonnet's rhyme scheme combines the octave and sestet structure of a Petrarchan sonnet with the concluding rhyming couplet of a Shakespearean sonnet. This gives it a first volta after line 8, where the poem's speaker turns from observing the destruction of the waves to the skeletons of the village dead, and a second volta after line 12, when the poem turns "inwards" to the speaker's own emotional experience.

== Reception ==
William Wordsworth singled out Sonnet XLIV in his personal 1789 copy of Elegiac Sonnets. Wordsworth's own later sonnets were influenced by Smith, and he privately described her as "a lady to whom English verse is under greater obligations than are likely to be either acknowledged or remembered," although he never discussed her works publicly. Wordsworth wrote on his copy to change the final line of Smith's poem from "To gaze with envy on their gloomy rest" to "To envy their insensible unrest." (Note: Some scholars have also identified Sonnet XLIV as one of the poems Wordsworth copied out in full on the flyleaf of his book, but in fact the poems he copied are two sonnets which would be added in the sixth edition, Sonnet XLIX and Sonnet LI.)
