= Elegiac Sonnets =

1784 poetry collection by Charlotte Smith

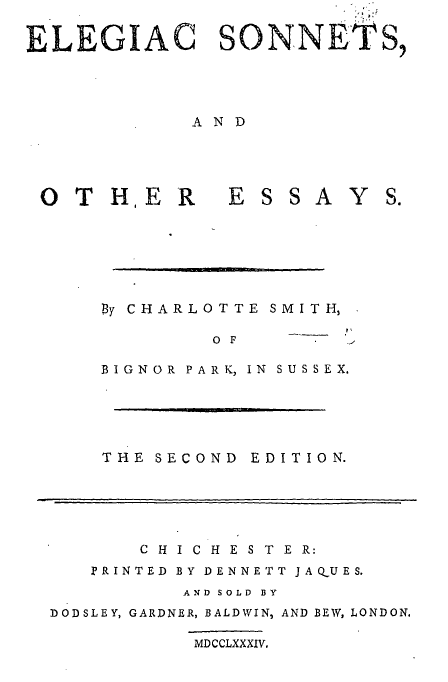
- The title page from the second edition
- Author: Charlotte Smith
- Publication date: 1784

Elegiac Sonnets, titled Elegiac Sonnets, and Other Essays by Charlotte Smith of Bignor Park, in Sussex in its first edition, is a collection of poetry written by Charlotte Smith, first published in 1784. It was widely popular and frequently reprinted, with Smith adding more poems over time. Elegiac Sonnets is credited with re-popularizing the sonnet form in the eighteenth century. It is notable for its poetic representations of personal emotion, which made it an important early text in the Romantic literary movement.

== Publication history ==
The first edition of Elegiac Sonnets in 1784 was a single volume with sixteen sonnets and three other poems. Six of these sonnets had previously appeared in the periodicals The European Magazine and The New Annual Register. The ninth edition, in 1800, was the last which Smith supervised. The last edition to add new poems, the tenth edition in 1812, was two volumes, with fifty-nine sonnets and eight other poems.

== Contents ==
=== Poems in the first 1784 edition ===
- Sonnet I ["The partial muse"] *
- Sonnet II, "Written at the Close of Spring" *
- Sonnet III, "To a Nightingale" *
- Sonnet IV, "To the Moon"
- Sonnet V, "To the South Downs" *
- Sonnet VI, "To Hope"
- Sonnet VII, "On the Departure of the Nightingale" *
- Sonnet VIII, "To Sleep" (Note: After the first edition, this poem is designated as Sonnet X in the second edition, and Sonnet XI in subsequent editions) *
- Chanson, par le Cardinal Bernis
- Imitation
- The Origin of Flattery
- Sonnet, Supposed to be Written by Werther ["Go, cruel tyrant"]
- Sonnet, Supposed to be Written by Werther, "To Solitude"
- Sonnet, Supposed to be Written by Werther ["Make there my tomb"]
- Sonnet, from Petrarch ["Loose to the wind"]
- Sonnet, from Petrarch ["Where the green leaves"]
- Sonnet, from Petrarch ["Ye vales and woods"]
- "To Spring" (Note: After the first edition, this poem is designated as Sonnet VIII)
- Untitled sonnet ["Blest is yon shepherd"] (Note: After the first edition, this poem is designated as Sonnet IX)

Poems marked with "*" appeared in periodical publications prior to being collected in the first volume.

=== Selected poems added in later editions ===
- Sonnet XXVII ["Sighing I see yon little troop"]
- Sonnet XXXII, "To Melancholy. Written on the banks of the Arun October, 1785"
- Sonnet XXXIX, from the novel of Emmeline, "To Night"
- Sonnet XL, from the novel of Emmeline, ["Far on the sands"]
- Sonnet XLI, "To Tranquillity"
- Sonnet XLIV, "Written in the Church Yard at Middleton in Sussex"
- Sonnet LIX, "Written during a Thunder Storm, September, 1791; in which the Moon was perfectly clear, while the Tempest gathered in various directions near the Earth."
- Sonnet LVIII, "The Glow-Worm"
- Sonnet LXX, "On Being Cautioned Against Walking on an Headland Overlooking the Sea, Because it was Frequented by a Lunatic"
- Sonnet LXXIV, "The Winter Night"
- Sonnet LXXX, "To the Invisible Moon"
- Sonnet LXXXIII, "The Sea View"
- Sonnet LXXXIV, "To the Muse"
- Sonnet XCII, "Written at Bignor Park in Sussex, in August, 1799"

== Style ==
Smith avoided the Italian Petrarchan sonnet form for her sonnets; of the ninety-two sonnets in the tenth edition of Elegiac Sonnets, only two are Petrarchan. Instead, she experimented with sonnet forms that were better suited to the English language. Many sonnets are technically Shakespearean sonnets, but most are irregular in some way. Scholars have described her experiments with the sonnet form as pursuing a simpler, more natural, and more direct poetic language which matched the emotions she expressed better than the artificial language common to Italian sonnets. This pursuit of simple, direct expression is among the reasons Smith is classed as a Romantic poet, and anticipates the poetic innovations of William Wordsworth and Samuel Taylor Coleridge's Lyrical Ballads. The Romantic poet John Keats was indebted to Smith's innovations for his own attempts to devise a new, specifically English sonnet form.

There was some backlash against this simplicity. Because Italian sonnets require many more rhymes on the same word ending, the Shakespearean sonnet form was considered to be easier than Petrarchan or Miltonic sonnets, and therefore less legitimate. William Beckford parodied the perceived easiness of Smith's sonnets with a poem called "Elegiac Sonnet to a Mopstick." Anna Seward, a major female sonneteer to follow Smith, criticized Smith for deviating from the prescribed forms. Similarly, when Mary Robinson published her own sonnet sequence in 1796, she emphasized her own adherence to formal rules in the title Sappho and Phaon: In a Series of Legitimate Sonnets.

=== Influences ===
Smith's sonnets were influenced by Thomas Gray's poetry, including his only sonnet, "On the Death of Mr. Richard West," which was written in 1742 and published in 1775. Smith frequently praised Gray as a poet and referenced his works, which share her melancholy tone. Smith was also aware of John Milton's seventeenth-century sonnets, such as his "O Nightingale," which defined what eighteenth-century poets expected from English sonnets. After the first edition of Elegiac Sonnets, Smith would also be influenced as a poet by William Cowper's The Task. Other major writers who shaped Smith's poetry include Francesco Petrarch, James Thomson, and Alexander Pope. There is no evidence that Smith was aware of William Shakespeare's sonnets, which were not well-known or well-regarded until the nineteenth century.

== Major themes ==
=== Melancholy sensibility ===
An overall feeling of bleak sadness is the dominating feature of Elegiac Sonnets, setting Smith's works apart from previous sonnets, which were typically love poems. Sentimental novels at the time popularly featured male figures of lonely, melancholy suffering, such as Harley in The Man of Feeling (1771) and Werther in The Sorrows of Young Werther (published in English in 1779). Elegiac Sonnets created a female, poetic version of this figure in many autobiographical sonnets. Other sonnets describe themselves as having been written by Werther and convey emotional moments of the book.

=== Nature ===
Smith's depiction of the natural world is notable for introducing a key Romantic theme in ways that don't match later Romantic depictions. The Romantic poet Samuel Taylor Coleridge particularly praised the sonnets that make connections between nature and human feelings, a poetic technique which would come to be a defining trait of Romantic poetry. However, in most of her poetry, Smith's depiction of nature differed from the later Romantics in that she was interested in the scientific details of the natural world. Her depictions of nature are not typically transcendent experiences which are interesting for how they impact the poet's selfhood, but rather descriptions of real-life phenomena which are interesting for the intellectual challenges they pose to understanding.

== Literary impact ==
=== Sonnet revival ===
The sonnet as a poetic form was first popular in English language during the Renaissance, but it had fallen out of use by the eighteenth century. Samuel Taylor Coleridge, in his literary criticism, famously credited Smith and her contemporary William Lisle Bowles (whose Fourteen Sonnets came out five years later, in 1789) with creating a revival of the English sonnet. Bowles achieved similar success to Smith, though contemporary reviews identified his form, tone, and subjects as derivatives of Smith's. The sonnet ultimately became one of the leading poetic forms of Romantic poetry, used at some point by every major Romantic poet except William Blake.

Importantly, the eighteenth century revival of the sonnet now included female sonneteers. Paula Feldman and Daniel Robinson described the revival as "the first period of literary history in which women poets showed they could match skill with male poets in an arena earlier closed to them, for previously women had existed in the sonnet only as love objects to be wooed or idealized." The sonnet form, as a classic and almost old-fashioned kind of writing, carried a cultural legitimacy which was lacking in newer genres like the novel. Smith was the first eighteenth-century woman to publish a volume of sonnets.

== Reception ==
Smith's sonnets were highly regarded during her lifetime. The journalist John Thelwall called Smith "the undisputed English master of the genre." The combination of the book's well-crafted poetry and its vivid emotional impact made Elegiac Sonnets one of the most well-respected and popular books of the century. In addition to inspiring poets to write their own sonnets, Elegiac Sonnets inspired many poets to write poems about Smith herself, celebrating her work and sympathizing with her difficult personal circumstances. She was the subject of extended praise by Samuel Taylor Coleridge, Sir Walter Scott, and Leigh Hunt, among many others.

However, after her death, Smith grew less popular as her poems came to be regarded as too sentimental. By the mid nineteenth century, she was no longer considered a major poet in her own right, but simply a "woman writer" and therefore "minor". By the end of the nineteenth century, Smith was largely forgotten.

With the rise of feminist literary criticism in the 1980s, scholars rediscovered Smith's works, especially Elegiac Sonnets. These poems are now featured in all major anthologies of Romantic literature.
