= Battle of Beachy Head =

Three naval battles were fought off the promontory of Beachy Head on the Sussex coast of England.

- The third day of fighting in the Battle of Portland, 1653, during the First Anglo-Dutch War, took place off Beachy Head between the fleets of the Commonwealth of England and the United Provinces.
- The Battle of Beachy Head (1690), during the War of the Grand Alliance, was fought between an Anglo-Dutch fleet and a French fleet.
- The Battle of Beachy Head (1707), during the War of the Spanish Succession, was a victory for the French fleet over a British convoy of 52 transports escorted by 3 English ships of the line.
