= Beachy Head (poem) =

Poem by Charlotte Turner Smith

- by Charlotte Turner Smith
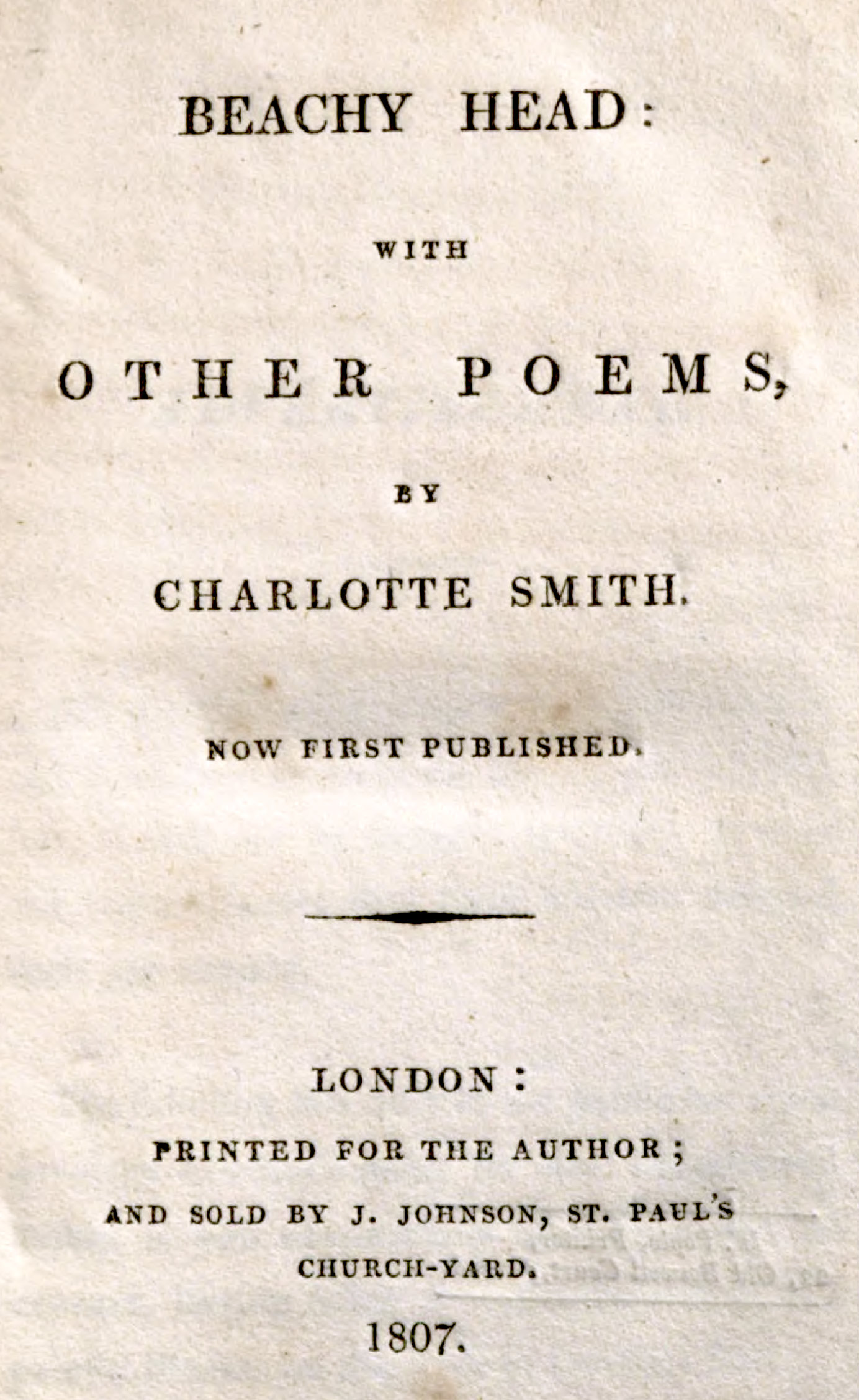
- Title page of the first edition
- Written: 1806
- Country: England
- Language: English
- Meter: iambic pentameter
- Rhyme scheme: blank verse
- Publication date: January 1807
- Lines: 742

Beachy Head (1807) is a long blank verse poem by the English Romantic poet and novelist Charlotte Turner Smith. Smith wrote Beachy Head between 1803 and 1806, near the end of her life, when she was struggling with debt and ill health. As the poem was being composed, Britain was engaged in the Napoleonic Wars with France, and Beachy Head was regarded as a likely invasion point for the French army; despite an environment of anti-French sentiment, Smith supported French revolutionary ideals of social reform. The poem was published the year after her death, as part of the volume Beachy Head and Other Poems. It was her last poetic work, and has been described as her most poetically ambitious work.

The poem imagines events at the coastal cliffs of Beachy Head from across England's history, to meditate on what Smith saw as the modern corruption caused by commerce and nationalism. Without an overarching narrative, the poem describes a series of scenes: fishers and smugglers using the coast; the Norman Conquest in the eleventh century; a shepherd and two children; the nearby village; a fossilized seashell at the top of a cliff; the futility of science and war; a wandering poetic stranger; and finally, another hermit who lived at the base of the cliffs. As she was composing the poem, Smith wrote sixty-four footnotes, providing details like the scientific names for plants and animals and discussions of historic events. These are generally considered an important element of the poem's multi-layered composition.

As a Romantic poem, Beachy Head is notable for its naturalist rather than sublime presentation of the natural world. A major eighteenth century aesthetic framework was the opposition between the sublime and the beautiful (or picturesque). Beachy Head as a whole is often interpreted as presenting either an anti-sublime viewpoint or a new definition of the sublime, in contrast to the dominant Romantic aesthetic. The poem also explores disillusionment with modern society, through its pastoral social critique and its two hermit figures.

The poem was well received on its first publication, when Smith's reputation as a poet was at a peak. As the nineteenth century went on, Smith's reputation and the importance of Beachy Head waned. By the early twentieth century Smith was considered only a minor writer of novels; when Smith began to attract new scholarly interest in the twentieth century, Beachy Head was often overshadowed by her novels and by Smith's first poetry volume, Elegiac Sonnets. Twenty-first century scholarship increasingly examines Beachy Head alongside Smith's other poetry as the culmination of her poetic career.

== Composition ==
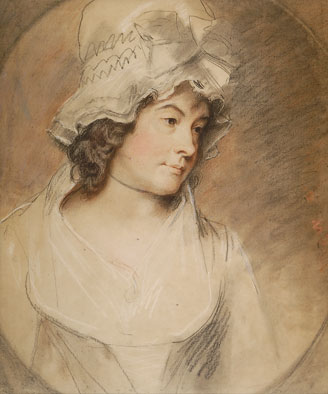
Charlotte Turner Smith in 1792

Charlotte Turner Smith, an English Romantic poet and novelist, began writing Beachy Head in 1803, the year that Britain and France ended their one year of peace between the French Revolutionary Wars and the Napoleonic Wars. At this time, Smith lived in cheap housing near her childhood home in the South Downs, eighty miles from Beachy Head, in poverty due to debt caused by her estranged husband, Benjamin Smith. Her novels had stopped selling well as readers were less sympathetic to her revolutionary political views, and she sold her personal library of 500 books to support herself. She was also increasingly ill during these years, with rheumatoid arthritis making it difficult to write, and sometimes immobilizing her.

Smith continued to write and revise Beachy Head for the next three years. She also wrote extensive footnotes to the poem. She sent a draft of the poem and notes to her publisher Joseph Johnson in May 1806. Smith died on October 28, 1806, and her relatives took over the task of publishing her works. According to the preface, the publication of Beachy Head was delayed because the publisher wanted to locate a preface possibly written by Smith, and to add a biography of her life, but ultimately it was published without these materials. The poem appeared in print January 31, 1807, as the first poem of the volume Beachy Head and Other Poems.

The preface written by Smith's publisher states that the poem was "not completed according to the original design", though Smith's last letter to Johnson does not mention intended revisions to the poem other than footnotes. Some scholars have concluded that Smith intended to add a short epitaph to the end of the poem. Others, however, believe that the poem intentionally falls within the genre of the Romantic fragment poem. In this reading, it has been suggested that the incomplete elements are the missing memoir or preface.

== Poem ==
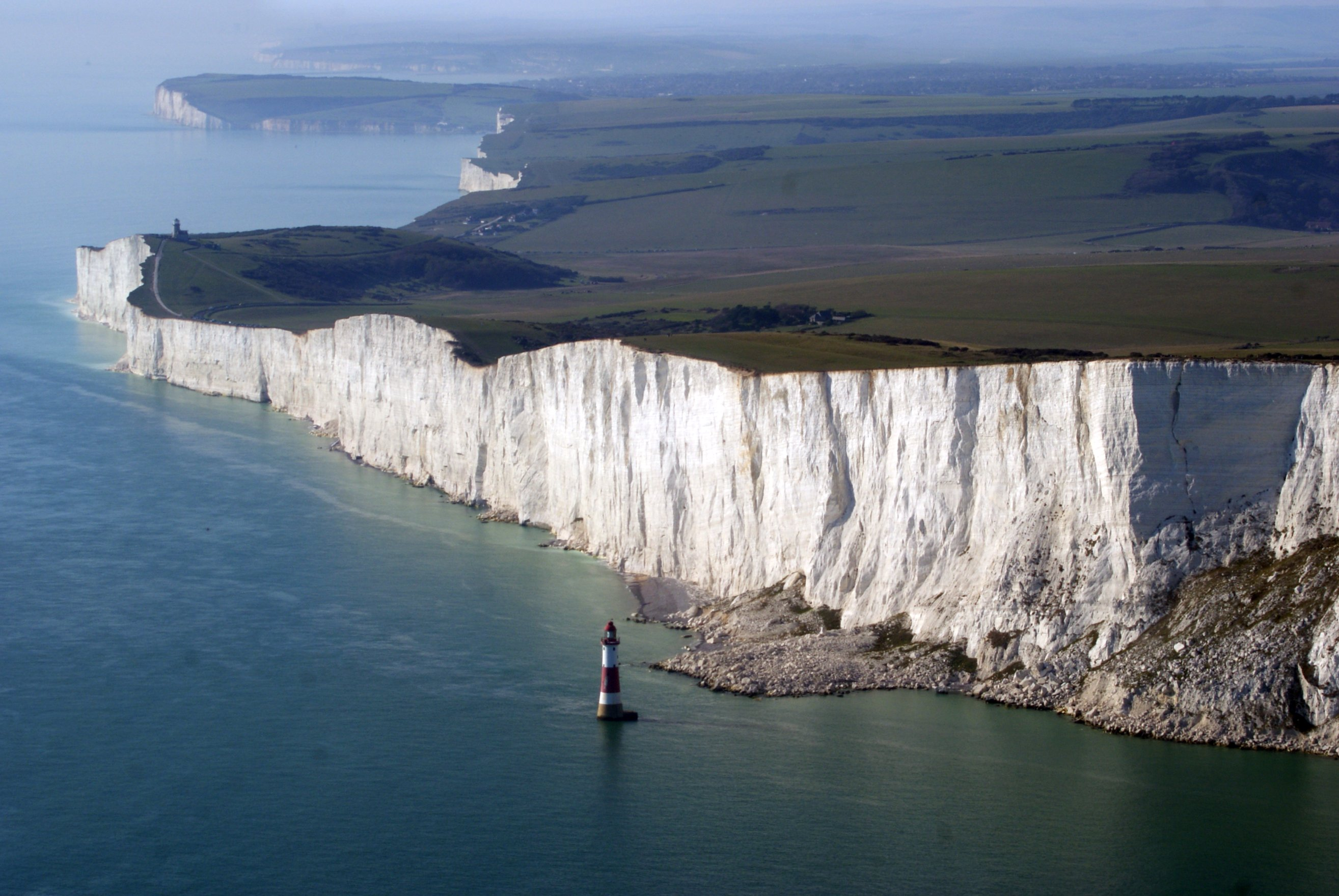
The chalk cliffs of Beachy Head

=== Synopsis ===
The poem does not present a narrative, but rather a loose meditation on the history of England and humanity's relationship with nature, addressed in an extended exclamation (or apostrophe) to the "Muse" of Beachy Head, headland with chalk cliffs in East Sussex, England. Throughout the poem, the speaker imagines or remembers Beachy Head and the surrounding area of the South Downs, describing a hypothetical vision of what the speaker might see if she could revisit the landscape. The first two stanzas imagine the events of a single day, beginning with dawn on the coast and the departure of fishing boats. A departing merchant ship prompts the speaker to criticize consumerism of luxury goods. The sun sets, the fishing boats return, and smugglers use the coast in darkness. In the third stanza, the poem shifts back in time to describe the history of Beachy Head during the Norman Conquest.

The sixth stanza returns to the present day, beginning an extended pastoral section. The poem describes a shepherd, deviating from typical pastoral poetry by demonstrating the rough and laborious realities of peasant life, rather than presenting idealized conventions. The poem describes two village children whose innocence allows them happiness, and the speaker describes her own lost childhood innocence. In the eighth stanza, the poem moves to look down upon the roofs of houses in the village, the church, and gardens, describing the bountiful local plants.

The eleventh stanza introduces natural history with the memory of a fossilized seashell found at the top of a cliff. This begins a sequence discussing the limits of science and ambition. The speaker describes how the successive wars fought in the area have not led to lasting glory for the combatants, but have been forgotten. The thirteenth stanza turns away from the futility of war to the more attractive image of the contemporary shepherd, and an imaginary long-distance view of peaceful life in England.

The fifteenth stanza begins a story of a "stranger" who used to live in a ruined castle, wandering and singing. Two fragments of his songs are included, by which he is remembered. His story is followed by that of another solitary but enviable figure, a hermit who lived at the base of the cliffs at Beachy Head, introduced in the nineteenth blank verse stanza. The hermit lived a harsh life of exile, but demonstrated virtue by risking his life to rescue sailors from shipwrecks during storms, burying those he could not save. After a particularly terrible storm, the hermit was himself found drowned, and he was buried by shepherds.

The poem ends with the statement that "Those who read / Chisel'd within the rock, these mournful lines, / Memorials of his sufferings, did not grieve", but unlike with the stranger's songs, no "mournful lines" are included in the poem. Some have interpreted these lines to indicate that Smith intended to add more verses to the poem, while others consider the poem to be complete.

== Style ==
=== Poetic form ===
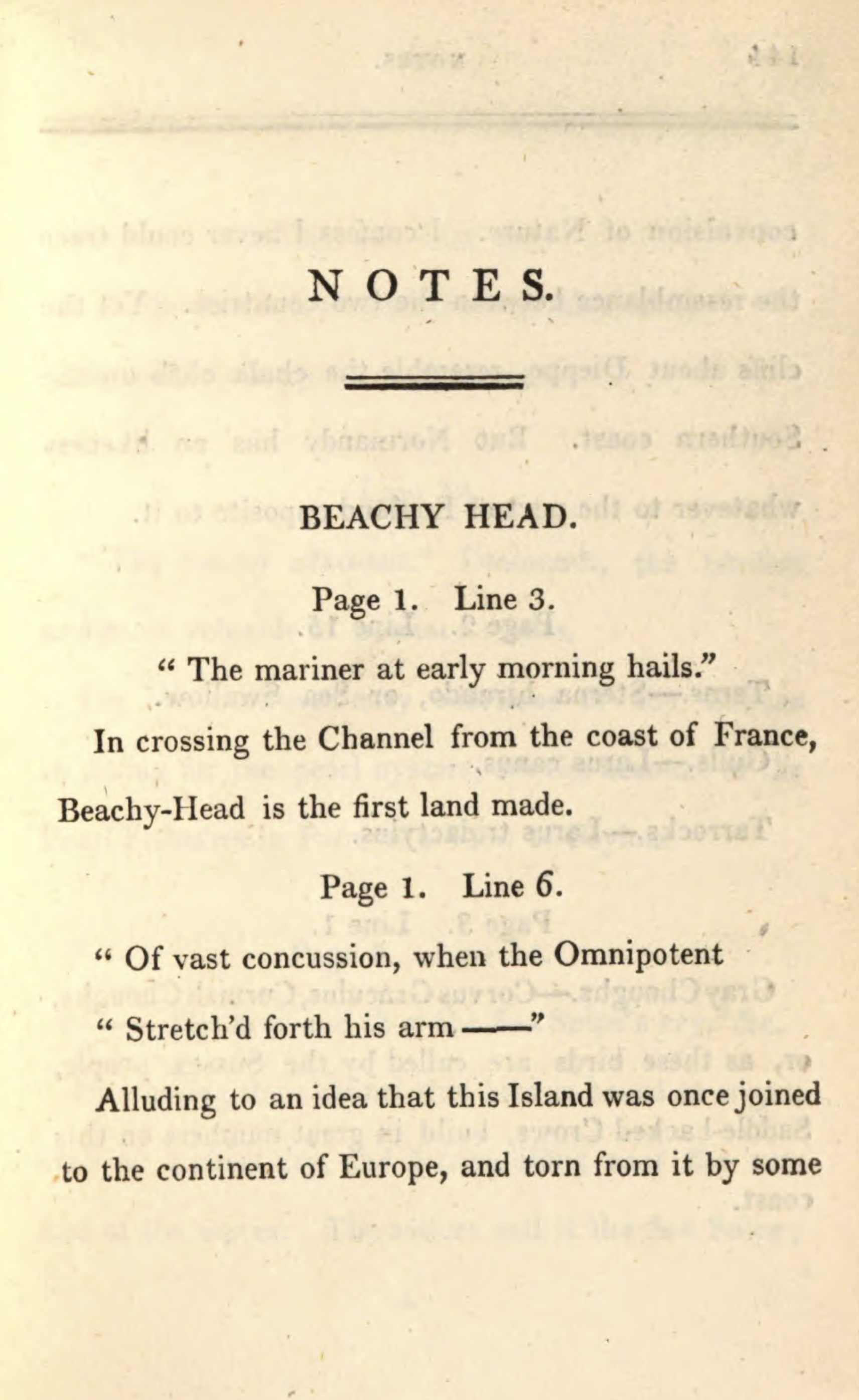
The first page of endnotes in the 1807 first edition of Beachy Head

The poem consists of 742 lines, in twenty-one blank verse stanzas of varying lengths, with two inserted rhyming poems that add nineteen additional stanzas. It is accompanied by sixty-four footnotes written by Smith.

Unlike Smith's most famous poems, her Elegiac Sonnets, Beachy Head does not follow a strict poetic convention or fall into a clear genre. In one scholar's words, the poem "forgoes the sonnets' crisp circumspection for expansive blank verse paragraphs". Donelle Ruwe describes the resulting genre as "a greater romantic lyric fragment", and others have also interpreted the poem as an intentional literary fragment. As a "dependent fragment poem", which relies on its relationship to its authors' other works for its full interpretation, Beachy Head is considered the first Romantic dependent fragment poem, with John Keats's two fragmented epics as the last.

The poem combines elements of epic, pastoral, and georgic poetry. It is also often considered a prospect poem, a popular Romantic genre of poem which presents, and often praises, an external landscape. For these scholars, Beachy Head is "in the first instance a place-related poem, a poem which both describes and constructs place, inscribing it into the imagination of its readers and into cultural history". In this reading, the poem's blank verse paragraphs are often seen as physically resembling the cliffs themselves, akin to concrete poetry. A related assessment sees it as an "excursion poem", which mingles travel descriptions with philosophical reflections, like William Wordsworth's The Excursion (1814).

Smith composed sixty-four notes to accompany the poem, which appeared collected as endnotes in the first edition. These notes provide, among other details, scientific names for plants and animals; descriptions of historical events; and explanations for some of her allusions to other writers. The notes are generally considered an important part of Smith's overall poetic approach. The notes establish Smith's position as an authority in areas ranging from historical contexts, to geological insights, and scientific examinations of wildlife. Smith's invocation of herself as an expert has been considered particularly impressive since these notes were composed after she sold her personal library, and thus the many facts and quotations included are based solely on her own memory; some quotations are, as a result, not word-perfect, but in general Smith's notes are remarkably accurate. By introducing academic topics, the notes also extend the boundaries of poetry, tying science to poetry in a symbiotic relationship. The combination of approaches mirrors the poem's presentation of the cliff itself as, in one scholar's words, "complex, many-layered, unfinished, and caught up in a continuous process of becoming", by describing the landscape in multiple ways simultaneously.

=== Poetic speaker ===
The first half of the poem is narrated from a first-person perspective. Although the speaker is never named, the narrating style is arguably similar to that which is used in the footnotes, suggesting it could be interpreted as Smith herself. The speaker looks at the events at Beachy Head in several perspectives. Some scholars emphasize the omniscience of the speaker, transcending human perspectives, while others see limits to what the speaker is able to describe or examine the speaker's individual personality as a person of sensibility.

The poem uses apostrophe throughout to address the subjects it describes, including personified concepts like ambition. The opening apostrophe to the cliffs of Beachy Head is similar to the poetic invocation of a muse common in epic poetry. As the speaker continues to address Beachy Head, the landscape develops a personality within the poem that changes it from a backdrop to almost a character in its own right. Ultimately, Beachy Head is presented "not as an instrument to be exploited and gawked at for sentimentalism's sake, but as a 'lively' companion to be sympathized with".

== Background ==
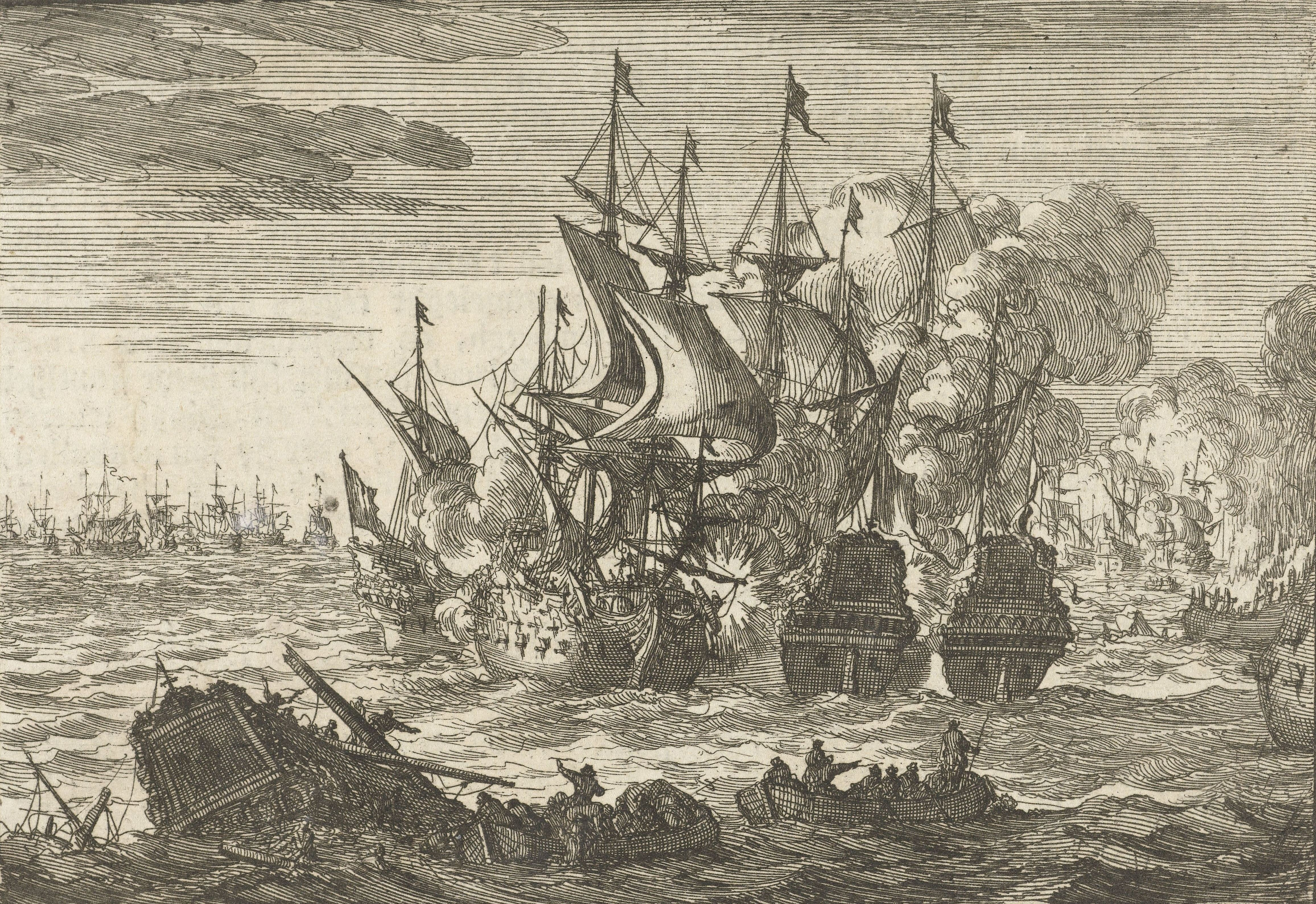
An illustration of the 1690 Battle of Beachy Head

=== Threats of French invasion ===
Britain and France were at war from 1792 to 1802 in the French Revolutionary Wars, and after a brief period of peace, returned to war in 1803 with the Napoleonic Wars. By 1805, tensions between the British and French were at their highest pitch, and many Britons feared an imminent invasion by the French. Beachy Head was considered a likely beachhead where soldiers might land in the anticipated French invasion of England, and British soldiers were stationed at Beachy Head as part of the British countermeasures. The 1690 Battle of Beachy Head, in which the English navy was defeated by the French, was often discussed in eighteenth century histories of invasion. Beachy Head as a location, therefore, called France to mind as a threat.

Smith has been called a "French Revolution poet", and frequently wrote in response to the political discourse, events, and philosophy of France. Smith supported French revolutionary ideals, especially ideals of radical cosmopolitanism and egalitarianism. In Beachy Head, Smith is "figuratively always looking across the Channel" at France. Beachy Head was chosen as a subject in part because "Smith imagined England as divided from the Continent most thinly by the Channel at this very spot". Smith drew attention to this closeness with her first footnote in the poem, which points out: "In crossing the Channel, from the coast of France, Beachy-Head is the first land made". The poem further highlights the context of the invasion threats by describing the 1690 Battle of Beachy Head, as well as the much earlier successive invasions of England: the Roman conquest of Britain beginning 48 AD, the Danish conquest of England beginning 1015 AD, and the Norman Conquest in 1066, which are all imagined to have happened in the same spot. Smith therefore put her contemporaries' anxieties about the other side of the Channel into a broader historical context. However, Smith does not remind readers of these successive invasions in order to stoke fears of conquest. Instead, she challenges the arbitrary nature of national borders. For example, she does not present the Norman conquest as a foreign tyrannical yoke on Anglo-Saxon liberties, and instead emphasizes the Normans' long and successful history. Rather than condemning one nation or another, Smith's strongest opposition is to war itself.

=== Romanticism ===
Smith's first published work, Elegiac Sonnets (1784), was an influential early text in the literary movement which would come to be known as Romanticism. Smith's sonnets differed from previous sonnets in both subject matter and tone. She wrote about her personal troubles, rather than love, and created an overall feeling of bleak sadness. She also used less complex rhyme schemes, to write sonnets that were sometimes criticized for their simplicity but have also been seen as pursuing more natural, more direct poetic language which matched the emotions she expressed better than the artificial language common to Italian sonnets. This pursuit of simple, direct expression is among the reasons Smith is classed as a Romantic poet, and partly inspired the poetic innovations of William Wordsworth and Samuel Taylor Coleridge's Lyrical Ballads (1798). Beachy Head challenges some conventions of Romantic poetry. For example, the poem evokes the Romantic idea of individual genius, but in a way that is "inflected by a desire to challenge social constructions of individuality".

== Major themes ==
=== Naturalist approach to nature ===
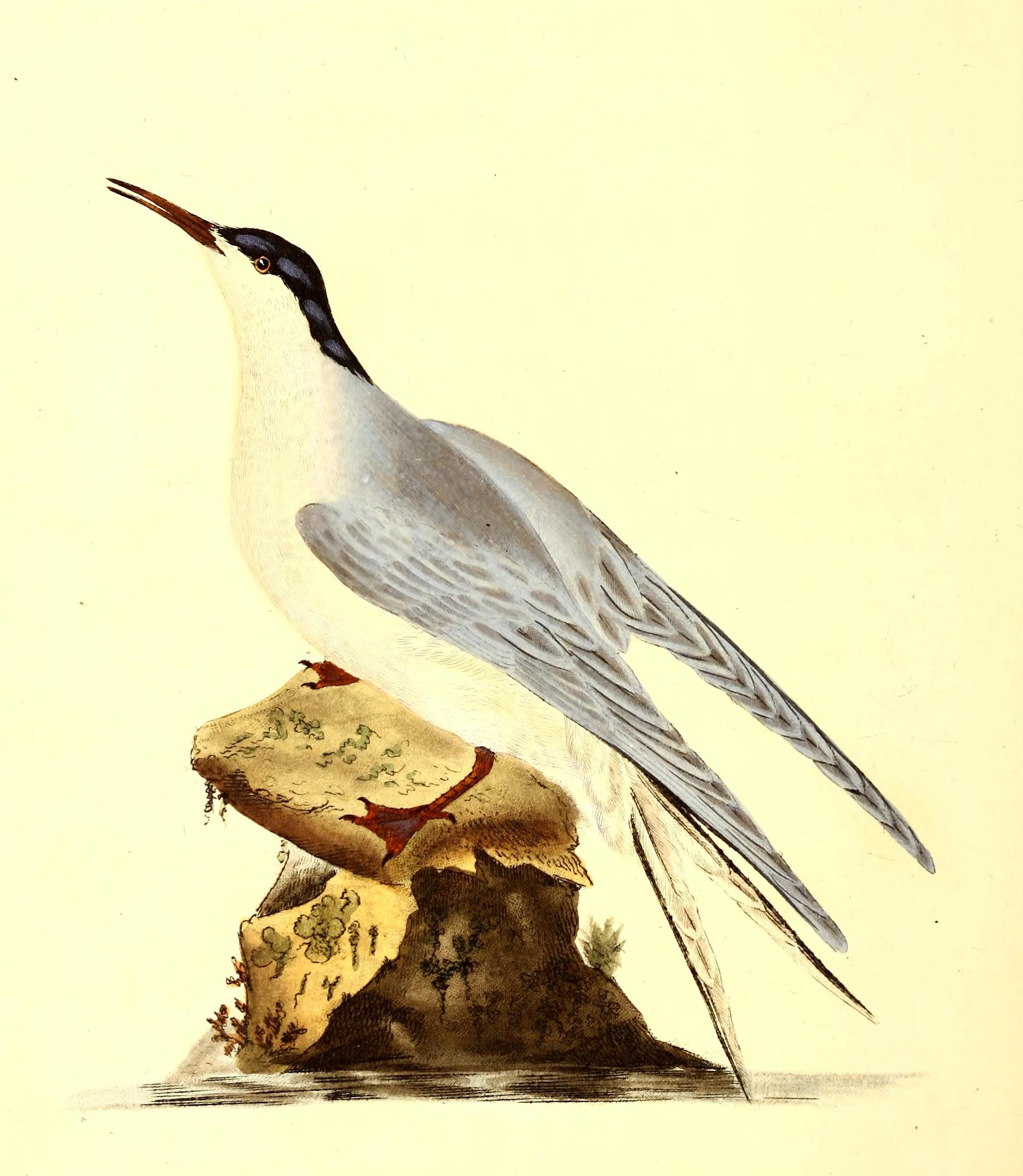
A 1795 illustration of a common tern, a species mentioned in Beachy Head and identified in a note by Smith as a Sterna hirundo

Like other Romantic poets, Smith considered the natural world to be of great importance, and nature plays a major role in her poetry. Unlike other Romantics, however, Smith's presentation of nature does not attempt to transcend, transform, abstract, or absorb the natural world. As such, the poem's presentation of nature has been discussed as providing a contrast to other Romantic poetry, especially that of William Wordsworth or Percy Shelley's Mont Blanc.

One distinctive element of Smith's treatment of nature is her attention to scientific accuracy. Beachy Head is noted for its "microscopic" attention to the detailed reality of plants and fossils, embracing natural history as the means through which to understand nature. Smith's interest in botany and ornithology is reflected in her footnotes describing the scientific names of fifty-one species of birds and plants. The botanical accuracy of Smith's poems was a hallmark of her writing from her first book, Elegiac Sonnets, which the later poet John Clare praised "because she wrote more from what she had seen of nature then [sic] from what she had read of it." Smith's eagerness to understand and describe the details of the natural world scientifically is contrasted with the "infinite, unthinkable" scope of nature in poems like The Prelude and Mont Blanc. Smith's approach was part of a broader phenomenon of women writing about botany and pedagogy, and shares some features with her educational works like Rural Walks.

Smith's approach to nature is also distinct for showing human activity as an integral part of the natural world, and embracing human stewardship of land and animals, which has been described as representing a "social ecology". Literary scholars interested in ecocriticism have described Smith as "one of the first social ecologist poets". Beachy Head is seen as calling for a more sustainable, more intimate relationship with nature, rather than treating the natural world as a resource to be exploited. In this way, Smith no longer seems to contrast with other Romantic attitudes toward nature. Instead, her interest in scientific minutiae is seen as a way of expanding the "green language" of Romanticism, which combines "a deep sensitivity for natural phenomena with forceful environmental advocacy." (Note: The concept of "green language" was defined in Raymond Williams's 1973 monograph The Country and the City, as a new way of writing about nature exemplified by William Wordsworth and John Clare.) Smith's "green language", according to Donna Landry, is "botanically exact and scientific yet charged with feeling", accomplishing the same goals with different rhetoric.

=== Pastoral critique of commerce ===
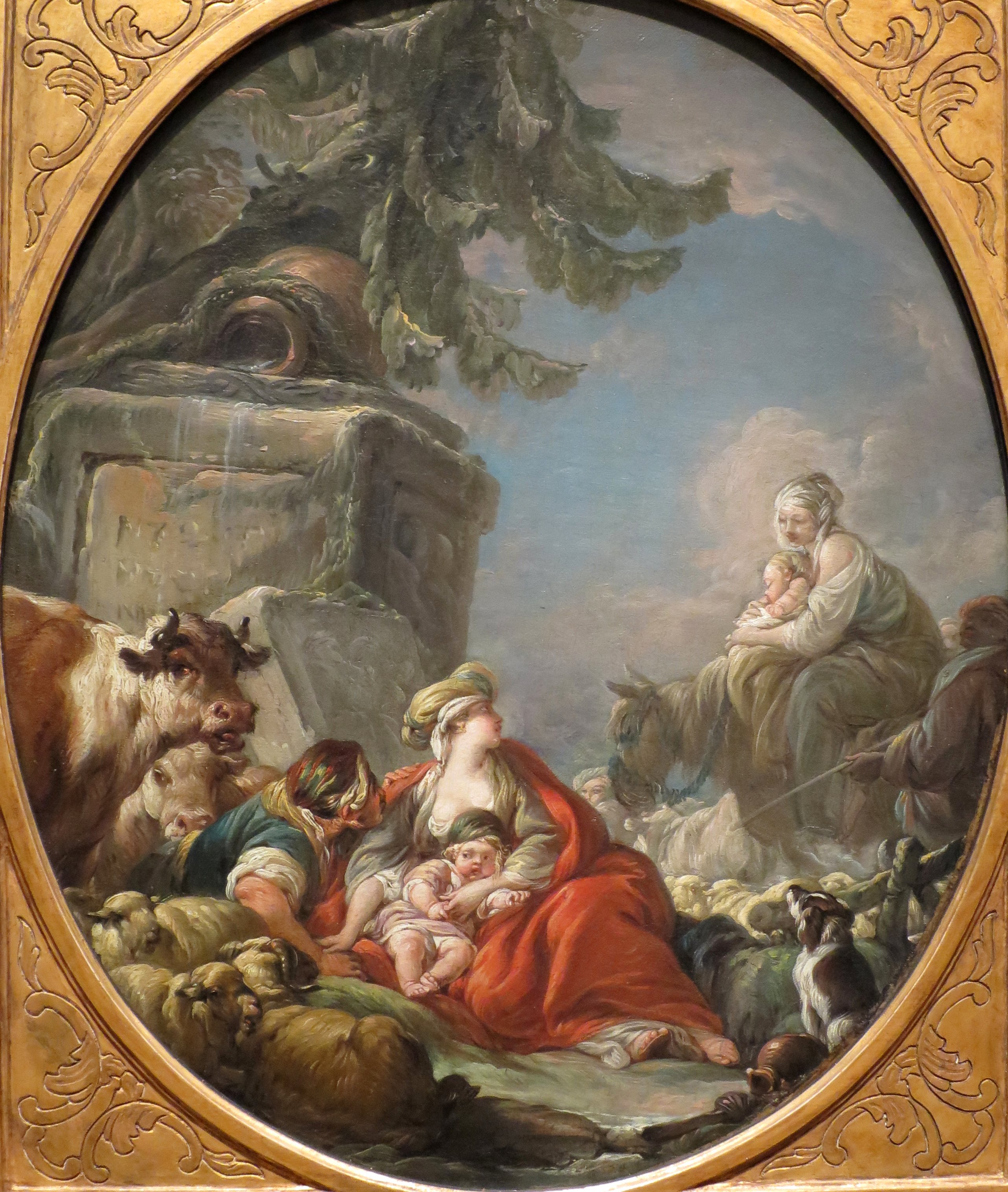
"Rest of the Shepherds," an eighteenth-century pastoral painting by Jean-Baptiste-Henri Deshays

Pastoral poetry conventionally presents the rural poor as innocent and carefree, in contrast with corrupt and unhappy urban dwellers. Often, this contrast also involves an unrealistically idealized image of daily life in rural communities. Smith's depiction of rural life and multiple shepherd characters both evokes and subverts the traditional pastoral mode. In keeping with common pastoral themes, Smith ennobles the hardships of the rural poor, and criticizes the luxuries of the rich. Smith juxtaposes pastoral happiness with the history of commerce as a way of revealing the unethical and exploitative nature of trade. The poem describes imperial commerce and slavery as harmful both to humanity and to nature. Smith criticizes the urban taste for consumer goods like silk, cotton, diamonds, and pearls, describing these as less beautiful and enduring than the natural world. She especially criticizes the phenomenon of shepherds and farmers abandoning rural labour in favour of smuggling, now that war with France has increased the demand for smuggled goods. The poem thus eulogizes a bygone era of innocent peasants living in rural contentment, a classic pastoral subject.

However, Smith is also realistic about the daily hard work required for rural life. She explores "the Petrarchan oxymoron of un-pastoral shepherds", with a shepherd character who is "neither the passive, suffering observer nor the pastoral fantasy of innocence". Smith also draws a contrast between real shepherds, who "toil with the realities of poverty, demeaning labour, and savage familial relationships", and the character of the wanderer, who writes poetry about how he imagines his life would be better if he were a shepherd. His ideal images are undermined by juxtaposition with the many real rural labourers who view him with suspicion. As such, although she rejects urban vices and commerce, and sees a form of freedom in the independence possible in rural isolation, Smith also intentionally depicts the oppression caused by wealth inequality, and rejects "the myth of the happy laborer who needs only to work the English countryside to be content".

=== Human history and geological time ===
The poem has been described as a dialectical exploration of historiography, placing local personal histories alongside grand national narratives of history. Classic linear histories of politics and statecraft are interwoven with individual narratives of personal experience and eyewitness accounts, which disrupt national histories through their focus on the individual. Scholars also draw attention to the poem's relation to the ongoing history being made of the Napoleonic war, and Smith's support of revolutionary efforts in America and France. Whereas other Romantic poets, especially Wordsworth, typically respond to significant changes in their society by creating a poetic world which does not include them, Smith's poetry is a "combination of imaginative verse and historical discourse, that refuses to cleanse the poetical vision of the oppression evident all around her". The poem expresses intertwined personal and political turmoil, combining what literary critic Donelle Ruwe describes as "the apocalyptic war rhetoric of the romantic era, as well as ... the celebration of the quotidian".

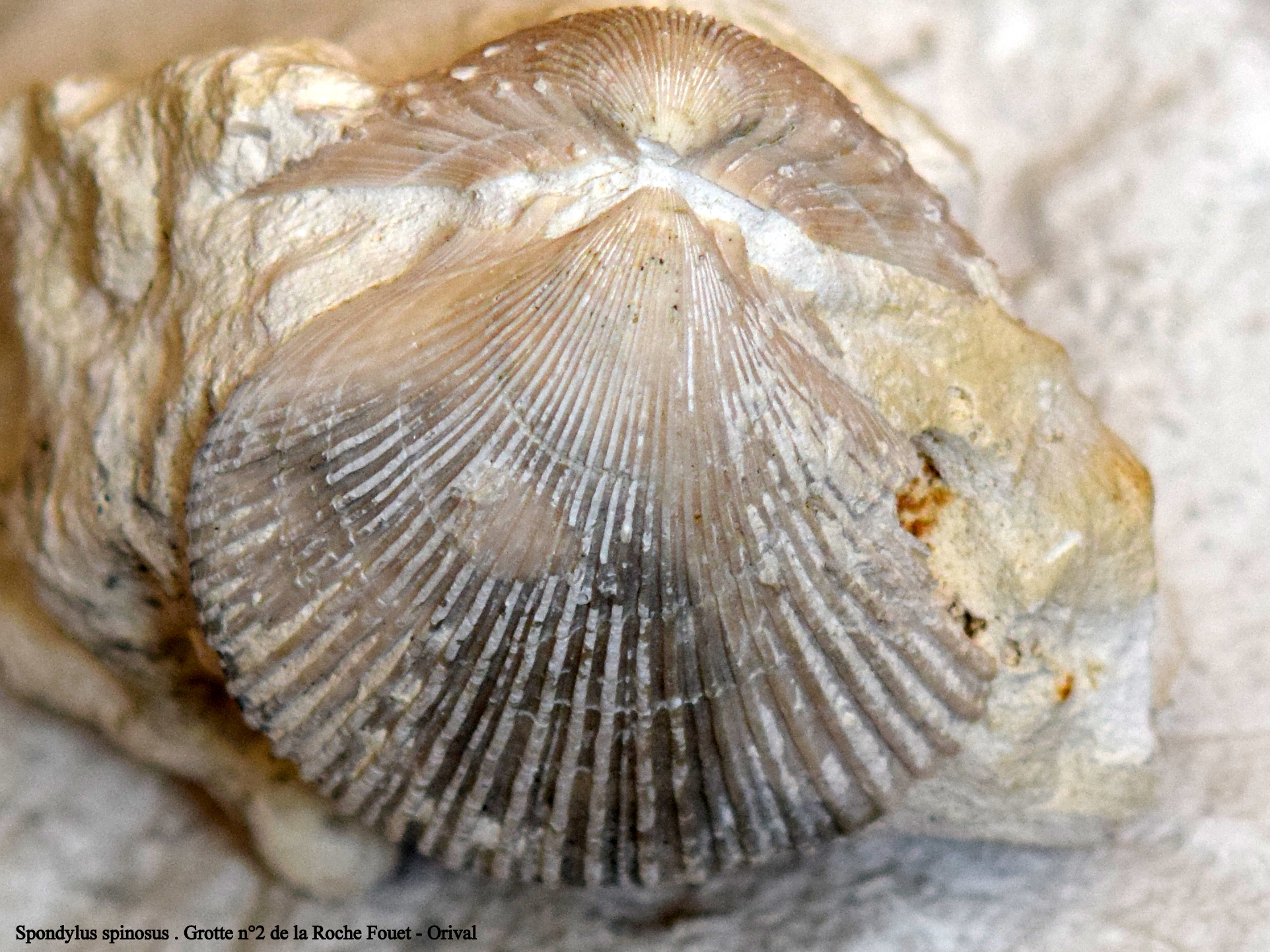
A spondylus fossilized in chalk

Also in tension with these personal and national human histories is the sense of a far older geological history. In its frequent descriptions of the stone, the earth, fossilized remains, and buried human remains, the poem evokes an awareness of deep time in which living humans are unimportant. The theory of plate tectonics would not become widely accepted for more than a hundred years, but Smith's poem observes evidence of geological change in the presence of fossils on mountaintops and similarities between the French and English shores. Her footnotes mention Nicolas Desmarest's 1751 theory that France and Great Britain were formerly joined by a land bridge, which was broken by some sort of "revolution" in the Earth itself. Smith links Desmarest's geological "revolution" to the ongoing political revolutions in Europe, placing them on a long and ongoing timescale whose ultimate results are impossible to imagine. However, she does not consider Desmarest's theory, or any other geological theories (such as neptunism and plutonism) fully satisfactory explanations, since they ignored fossil evidence. For Smith, the geological and archaeological findings at Beachy Head highlight the limits of human pride and scientific accomplishment.

=== Alternative form of the sublime ===
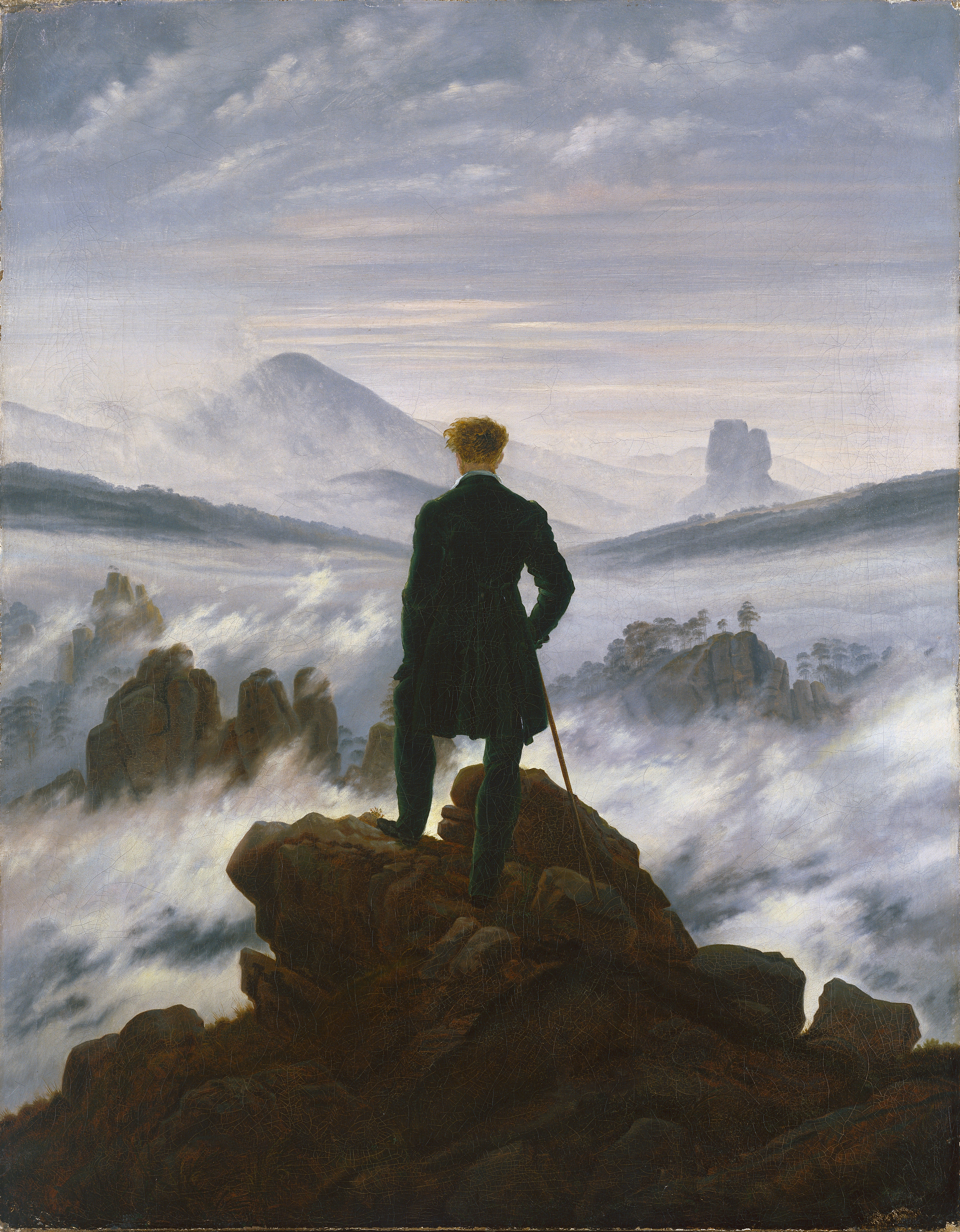
"Wanderer Above the Sea of Fog" (1818), a painting depicting the sublime, by Caspar David Friedrich

A major eighteenth century aesthetic framework was the opposition between the beautiful (or picturesque) and the sublime, especially as described in Edmund Burke's A Philosophical Enquiry into the Origin of Our Ideas of the Sublime and Beautiful (1757). The binary was conventionally a gendered one: beautiful sights are delicate, domestic, and feminine; sublime sights are awe-inspiring, alien, and masculine. Beachy Head as a whole is often interpreted as presenting either an anti-sublime viewpoint or a new definition of the sublime, in resistance to this gendered binary. Unlike Wordsworth's description of the River Wye in "Tintern Abbey" or Shelley's description of Mont Blanc in "Mont Blanc", Smith's description of Beachy Head "shows no fear that she may lose herself in contemplation and shows no need to master or struggle against the nature she describes". If the poem depicts sublime encounters, they are "not found in an overwhelming grandeur but in the infinite within the finite," such as the precise details of flower petals and seashells when closely examined. The fossils, especially, have sublime potential because they evoke deep epistemological uncertainty about the nature of the earth and its history.

=== The doubled hermit figure ===
Hermits often appear in Romantic poetry to symbolize disillusionment with the society which the hermit has abandoned. Beachy Head features two reclusive figures: the first is a wandering stranger poet, and the second is a hermit who lives at the base of the cliff. Many scholars emphasize the contrast between the "egocentric and unproductive" wandering poet and the more meritorious second hermit. The contrast between the two recluses has been interpreted as a critique of selfish individualism in other Romantic poetry, with the poetic wanderer representing "canonical Romanticism". In this context, scholars highlight that both figures have experienced hope followed by disillusionment, but only the hermit has responded "with his sensibility, his humanitarianism, and his commitment to individual action still intact". The second hermit is also often seen as a stand-in for Smith herself.

== Influences ==
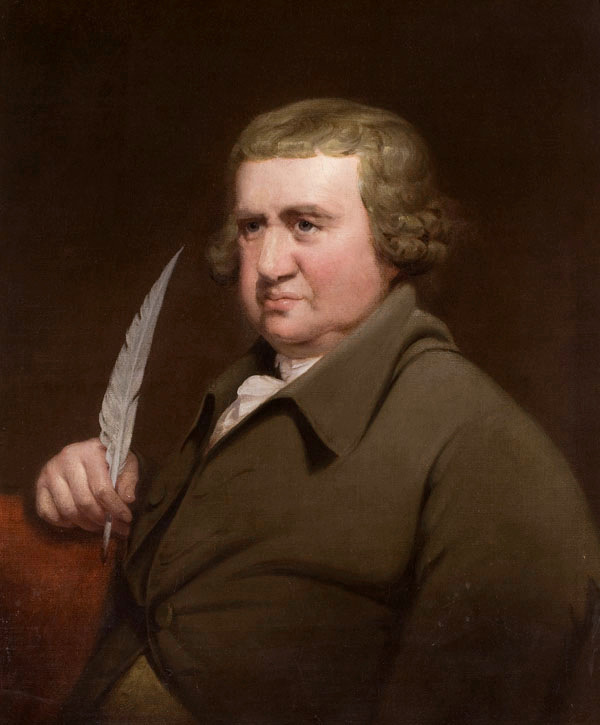
Erasmus Darwin, a major influence on Smith's naturalist poetic style

Smith's political philosophy was influenced by French philosophers and the ideals of radical cosmopolitanism and egalitarianism. She also engages with Adam Smith's Theory of Moral Sentiments (1759) and Anna Barbauld's Inquiry into Those Kinds of Distress which Excite Agreeable Sensations (1773), which present compassion, sympathy, and reason in terms of gendered binaries that Smith rejects.

Poetically, Smith is strongly influenced by William Cowper and Erasmus Darwin. Darwin's scientific poetry, especially The Love of the Plants (1789), serves as a precursor for Smith's naturalist poetics, including her interest in minutiae and references to Linnean classification. The poem also alludes to John Milton and Oliver Goldsmith, identified in her endnotes.

William Wordsworth is the Romantic poet most often discussed closely with Smith. Over their parallel poetic careers, their poetry often shares themes, subjects, and speakers. Often, Smith is described as influencing Wordsworth more than she is influenced by him. In Beachy Head, Smith alludes to Wordsworth's poems, especially his Tintern Abbey, inviting readers to compare their approaches. The character of the wandering poet may be a representation of Wordsworth. As a response to Wordsworth, Beachy Head challenges his poetic priorities and aesthetics, especially criticizing his self-absorbed abstractions.

== Reception ==
Early reception of Beachy Head was largely positive, and used the posthumous publication of the volume as an opportunity to praise Smith's career as a poet. An 1807 review in the Annual Review and History of Literature said that "as a descriptive writer, either in verse or prose, [Smith] was surpassed by few". In 1808, a review in British Critic described the collection containing Beachy Head as "some of her best work", calling Smith a "genuine child of genius" whose "poetic feeling and ability have rarely been surpassed by any individual of her sex". Later, in 1825, Alexander Dyce included extracts from Beachy Head in his anthology, Specimens of British Poetesses: Selected and Chronologically Arranged, in which he praised the poem for its "fresh and vivid" descriptions of rural scenery. Dyce praised how Smith's love of botany allowed her to "paint a variety of flowers with a minuteness and a delicacy rarely equaled".

As the nineteenth century went on, Smith's reputation and the importance of Beachy Head waned. Smith's legacy instead focused on her earliest poems, Elegiac Sonnets, which continued to be commercially successful in anthologies of women's writing even as Smith was less respected as a poet. The 1883 anthology English Poetesses, for example, does not mention Beachy Head in its biography of Smith. Even Elegiac Sonnets attracted less interest over time, and by the early twentieth century Smith was considered only a minor writer of novels.

At the end the twentieth century, a resurgence of scholarly interest in Smith's works was prompted by the 1960s and 1970s feminist movement's recovery of women's writing. This resurgence reached a new peak in the 1980s and 1990s, but remained focused on Smith's sonnets and novels. Jacqueline M. Labbe's 2003 book, Charlotte Smith: Romanticism, Poetry, and the Culture of Gender, was the first book-length study of Smith's poetry, and emphasized Beachy Head as an important culmination of Smith's poetic development. In 2019, Bethan Roberts' Charlotte Smith and the Sonnet: Form, Place and Tradition in the Late Eighteenth Century similarly examined all of Smith's poetry and treated Beachy Head as the culmination of her poetic efforts. Smith's modern impact can also be seen in a musical adaptation, "The Song Cycles of Beachy Head", by composer Amanda Jacobs and scholar Elizabeth A. Dolan. It was developed between 2014 and 2016, and recorded in 2017 at the British Women Writers Association Conference. Today, some critics claim Smith's work has a tendency to "read stiltedly" for modern audiences, while others argue that Beachy Head "strikes distinctly modern chords" from both a psychological and ecological standpoint.

== Bibliography ==
=== References ===
- Anderson, John M. (2000). "Beachy Head: The Romantic Fragment Poem As Mosaic". Huntington Library Quarterly. 63 (4): 547–574. doi:10.2307/3817616. ISSN 0018-7895. JSTOR 3817616.
- Backscheider, Paula R. (2005). Eighteenth Century Women Poets and their Poetry: Inventing Agency, Inventing Genre. Baltimore: The Johns Hopkins University Press.
- Behrendt, Stephen C. (2008). "Charlotte Smith, Women Poets, and the Culture of Celebrity". In Labbe, Jacqueline (ed.). Charlotte Smith in British Romanticism. Pickering & Chatto.
- Benis, Toby R. (2012-04-12). "Excursion Poem". In Burwick, Frederick (ed.). The Encyclopedia of Romantic Literature. Oxford, UK: John Wiley & Sons. doi:10.1002/9781118300916.wberle012. ISBN 978-1-118-30091-6.
- Black, Joseph, ed. (2018). Beachy Head (3rd ed.). Broadview Press.
- Black, Joseph; Conolly, Leonard; Flint, Kate; Grundy, Isobel; LePan, Don; Liuzza, Roy; McGann, Jerome J.; Prescott, Anne Lake; Qualls, Barry V.; Waters, Claire, eds. (2010). "Charlotte Smith". The Broadview Anthology of British Literature: The Age of Romanticism. Vol. 4 (Second ed.). Broadview Press. pp. 44–45.
- Blank, Antje (2003-06-23). "Charlotte Smith". The Literary Encyclopedia. Vol. 1.2.1.06: English Writing and Culture of the Romantic Period, 1789-1837.
- Blain, Virginia (1990). The Feminist Companion to Literature in English: Women Writers from the Middle Ages to the Present. Yacle University Press.
- Bray, Matthew (1993). "Removing the Ango-Saxon Yoke: The Francocentric Vision of Charlotte Smith's Later Works". Nineteenth-Century Literature Criticism. 115: 155–159.
- Craciun, Adriana (2005). British Women Writers and the French Revolution: Citizens of the World. Palgrave.
- Curran, Stuart, ed. (1993). "Introduction". The Poems of Charlotte Smith. New York. pp. xix–xxix.
- Duckling, Louise (2008). "'Tell my Name to Distant Ages': The Literary Fate of Charlotte Smith". In Labbe, Jacqueline (ed.). Charlotte Smith in British Romanticism. Pickering & Chatto. p. 203-217.
- Dyce, Alexander (1825). Specimens of British Poetesses: Selected and Chronologically Arranged. T. Rodd.
- Erchinger, Phillip (2018). "Science, Footnotes, and the Margins of Poetry in Percy B. Shelley's Queen Mab and Charlotte Smith's Beachy Head". European Journal of English Studies. 22 (3): 241–257. doi:10.1080/13825577.2018.1513709. S2CID 150067637.
- Feldman, Paula R.; Robinson, Daniel (1999). A Century of Sonnets: The Romantic-Era Revival, 1750-1850. New York: Oxford University Press. ISBN 978-0-19-511561-1. OCLC 252607495.
- Fletcher, Loraine (1998). Charlotte Smith: A Critical Biography. Palgrave.
- Goodman, Kevis (2014). "Conjectures on Beachy Head: Charlotte Smith's Geological poetics and the grounds of the present". ELH. 81 (3): 983–1006. doi:10.1353/elh.2014.0033. S2CID 161287287.
- Gurton-Wachter, Lily (2009). ""An Enemy, I suppose, that Nature has made": Charlotte Smith and the natural enemy". European Romantic Review. 20 (2): 197–205. doi:10.1080/10509580902840475. ISSN 1050-9585. S2CID 143498569.
- Haekel, Ralf (2017). "Charlotte Smith, Beachy Head (1807)". Handbook of British Romanticism: 339–358.
- Heringman, Noah (2004). Romantic Rocks, Aesthetic Geology. Ithaca, N.Y.: Cornell University Press.
- Holt, Kelly M. (2014). "Charlotte Smith's Beachy Head: Science and the Dual Affliction of Minute Sympathy". ABO: Interactive Journal for Women in the Arts, 1640-1830. 4. doi:10.5038/2157-7129.4.1.2.
- Keane, Angela (2012). Revolutionary Women Writers: Charlotte Smith and Helen Maria Williams. Northcote House Publishers.
- Kelley, Theresa (2004). "Romantic Histories: Charlotte Smith and Beachy Head". Nineteenth-Century Literature. 59 (3): 281–314. doi:10.1525/ncl.2004.59.3.281.
- Knowles, Claire; Horrocks, Ingrid, eds. (2017). Charlotte Smith: Major Poetic Works. Broadview Press.
- Labbe, Jacqueline M. (2003). Charlotte Smith: Romanticism, Poetry and the Culture of Gender. Manchester University Press. ISBN 9780719060045.
- Labbe, Jacqueline (2017). "Charlotte Smith, Beachy Head". In Wu, Duncan (ed.). A Companion to Romanticism. Oxford, UK: Blackwell Publishers. pp. 221–227. doi:10.1002/9781405165396.ch19. ISBN 978-1-4051-6539-6. OCLC 244174741.
- Landry, Donna (January 2000). "Green Languages? Women Poets as Naturalists in 1653 and 1807". Huntington Library Quarterly. 63 (4): 467–489. doi:10.2307/3817613. ISSN 0018-7895. JSTOR 3817613.
- Lokke, Kari (2008). "The Figure of the Hermit in Charlotte Smith's Beachy Head". The Wordsworth Circle. 39 (1–2): 38–43. doi:10.1086/TWC24045185. S2CID 160075091.
- McKusick, James C. (1991). "'A language that is ever green': The Ecological Vision of John Clare". University of Toronto Quarterly. 61 (2): 226–249. doi:10.3138/utq.61.2.226. ISSN 1712-5278. S2CID 162295216.
- Menely, Tobias (2017). "Late Holocene Poetics: Genre and Geohistory in Beachy Head". European Romantic Review. 28 (3): 307–14. doi:10.1080/10509585.2017.1314669. S2CID 148606166.
- Morton, Timothy (2014). Material Ecocriticism. Bloomington, Indiana: Indiana University Press. p. 272. ISBN 978-0-253-01395-8.
- Pascoe, Judith (1994). "Female Botanists and the Poetry of Charlotte Smith". In Wilson, Carol Shiner; Haefner, Joel (eds.). Re-Visioning Romanticism. University of Philadelphia Press. pp. 193–209.
- Radu, Anca-Raluca (2017). "Charlotte Smith, Beachy Head (1807)". In Haekel, Ralf (ed.). Handbook of British Romanticism. De Gruyter Inc. p. 443.
- Reinfandt, Christoph (2013). "The textures of Romanticism: exploring Charlotte Smith's Beachy Head (1807)". Proceedings Anglistentag 2012 Potsdam. Universität Tübingen: 99–114. doi:10.15496/publikation-13233. ISBN 978-3-86821-488-8.
- Roberts, Bethan (2019). Charlotte Smith and the Sonnet Form: Place and Tradition in the Late Eighteenth Century. Liverpool: Liverpool University Press. ISBN 978-1-78962-434-2. OCLC 1138095953.
- Robertson, Eric S. (1883). English poetesses: a series of critical biographies. London: Paris & New York, Cassell & company limited. pp. 64–73.
- Rowlett, John (1999). "Ornithological Knowledge and Literary Understanding". New Literary History. 30 (3): 625–647. doi:10.1353/nlh.1999.0041. ISSN 0028-6087. JSTOR 20057558.
- Ruwe, Donelle (1999). "Charlotte Smith's Sublime: Feminine Poetics, Botany, and Beachy Head". Essays in Romanticism. 7 (1): 117–132. doi:10.3828/EIR.7.1.7.
- Ruwe, Donelle (2003). "Benevolent Brothers and Supervising Mothers: Ideology in the Children's Verses of Mary and Charles Lamb and Charlotte Smith". Nineteenth-Century Literature Criticism, Edited by Lynn M. Zott. 125: 337 – via Gale Literature Criticism.
- Ruwe, Donelle (2016). "Charlotte Smith's Beachy Head and the Lyric Mode". Pedagogy. 16 (2): 300–307. doi:10.1215/15314200-3435916. S2CID 147533436.
- Scarth, Kate (2014-08-05). "Elite Metropolitan Culture, Women, and Greater London in Charlotte Smith's Emmeline and Celestina". European Romantic Review. 25 (5): 627–648. doi:10.1080/10509585.2014.938230. ISSN 1050-9585. S2CID 145513731.
- Schabert, Ina (October 2014). "From Feminist to Integrationist Literary History: 18th Century Studies 2005-2013". Literature Compass. 11 (10): 667–676. doi:10.1111/lic3.12179.
- Singer, Katherine (2012-06-23). "Charlotte Smith: Beachy Head". The Literary Encyclopedia. Vol. 1.2.1.06: English Writing and Culture of the Romantic Period, 1789-1837.
- Smith, Charlotte (1807). Beachy Head: With Other Poems. London: J. Johnson.
- Stanton, Judith (2006). "Review of Charlotte Smith: Romanticism, Poetry, and the Culture of Gender". Keats–Shelley Journal. 55: 246–248. ISSN 0453-4387. JSTOR 30210660.
- Stanton, Judith Phillips (2018). "The Song Cycles of Charlotte Smith's "Beachy Head" by Amanda Jacobs (review)". Keats–Shelley Journal. 67: 224–226.
- Tayebi, Kandi (2004). "Undermining the Eighteenth-Century Pastoral: Rewriting the Poet's Relationship to Nature in Charlotte Smith's Poetry". European Romantic Review. 15 (1): 131–50. doi:10.1080/1050958042000180737. S2CID 170774085.
- Wallace, Anne D. (2002). "Picturesque Fossils, Sublime Geology? The Crisis of Authority in Charlotte Smith's Beachy Head". European Romantic Review. 12: 77–93. doi:10.1080/10509580212764. S2CID 129504062.
- Wallace, Anne D. (January 2019). "Interfusing Living and Nonliving in Charlotte Smith's Beachy Head". The Wordsworth Circle. 50 (1): 1–19. doi:10.1086/702580. ISSN 0043-8006. S2CID 167104335.
- Zimmerman, Sarah (2007). "Varieties of Privacy in Charlotte Smith's Poetry". European Romantic Review. 18 (4): 492. doi:10.1080/10509580701646800. S2CID 144741513.
