= Pamela in her Exalted Condition =

1742 novel by Samuel Richardson

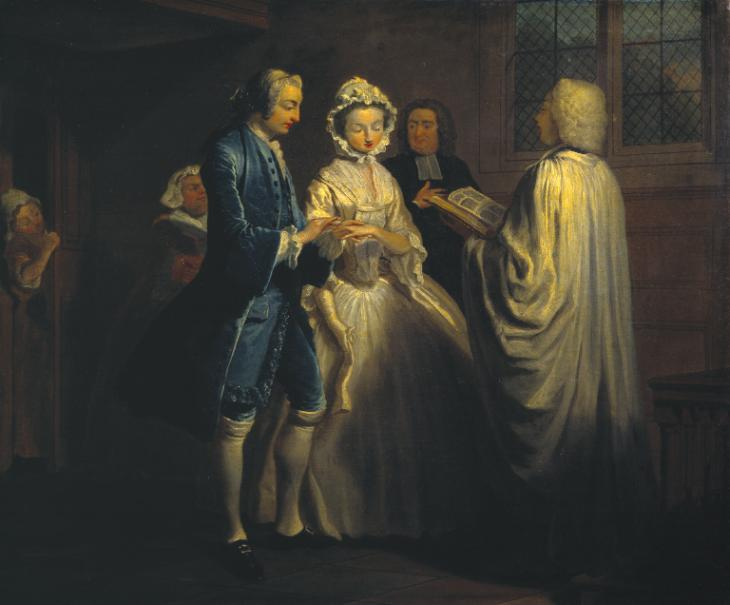
A depiction of Pamela and Mr. B's wedding painted by Joseph Highmore as part of his series of Pamela paintings.

Pamela in Her Exalted Condition is Samuel Richardson's 1742 sequel to his novel, Pamela; or Virtue Rewarded. Richardson wrote the novel as a response to criticisms of his original work, continuations written by other authors, and readers' desire to read about the life of the protagonist, the 15-year-old former maid, Pamela, after her ascent into genteel life following her marriage to and reformation of the rakish Mr. B from the original novel. Richardson's sequel explores debates and questions about the roles of women and the challenges Pamela faces in her new life as a wife, mother, and member of the upper class. The novel was a critical and commercial failure.

== Background ==
Richardson's first novel, Pamela, was a popular and critical success, engaging a large readership who felt very attached to the character due to the original novel's epistolary form, intimate and realistic writing style, and strong moral basis. This led to the creation of satires of Richardson's work, such as Henry Fielding's Shamela and Joseph Andrews and Eliza Haywood's The Anti-Pamela, as well as unauthorized sequels. Three notable sequels were published in 1741: John Kelly's Pamela’s Conduct in High Life and two anonymous sequels: Pamela in High Life and The Life of Pamela. The latter is a third-person retelling of both Richardson's original novel and Kelly's continuation. These unofficial sequels capitalized off the novel's popularity to draw in readers and make a profit. Both the satires and unofficial sequels led Richardson to write an official continuation of his original novel titled Pamela in her Exalted Condition, which was published in 1742.

== Plot ==
In the sequel to his first novel, Richardson further defines Pamela's morality and demonstrates her growth and increasing gentility as she grows accustomed to her new married life in a higher social class. The follow-up novel responds to what Richardson felt were misinterpretations of his original work and characters. Literary analyst Peter Sabor writes,

By refining both the language and conduct of Pamela and Mr B., Richardson answered critics who saw them as hypocrite and rake, while their fertile and generally harmonious union counters those who regarded the marriage as a regrettable misalliance. Controversial episodes from the first two volumes are rehearsed and explained, while obscure ones are given greater prominence: Pamela II is designed to show how Pamela should be read. In addition, a thicket of footnotes guides the reader to particular passages in both parts of the novel that support Richardson's authorial interpretation of the text.

This interest in refining the characters and their morals and conduct led to the novel being much less exciting than Richardson's original work. In the novel, Pamela becomes pregnant and Mr. B has an extramarital relationship; however, the novel mostly contains moral and philosophical debates and much calmer resolutions to the issues that arise in their marriage. By the end of the novel, Pamela has fully adjusted to her role as a woman of gentility, marking a dramatic shift from her working-class origins, and Mr. B is fully reformed, becoming a statesman. These changes, while cementing Richardson's intentions and visions for his characters, led to a much less exciting novel that did not carry the same appeal as the first, leading it to be far less read and studied.

== Critical Edition ==
- The Cambridge Edition of the Works of Samuel Richardson Book 3, edited and annotated by Albert J. Rivero (2012)
