= 1741 in literature =

This article contains information about the literary events and publications of 1741.

== Events ==
- January 15 – The revival in the London theatre of Shakespeare plays featuring actresses in travesti roles continues at the Theatre Royal, Drury Lane with Hannah Pritchard as Viola in Twelfth Night, a play not performed for more than 70 years. Kitty Clive plays Olivia. Mrs Pritchard's Rosalind (As You Like It) remains in the repertory.
- January 29 – A life-size memorial to William Shakespeare (d. 1616), designed by William Kent and sculpted by Peter Scheemakers, is erected in the Poets' Corner of Westminster Abbey.
- February 13 – Andrew Bradford launches the American colonies' first periodical in Philadelphia, the American Magazine.
- February 14 – Irish-born actor Charles Macklin makes his London stage debut as Shylock in The Merchant of Venice at the Theatre Royal, Drury Lane, pioneering a psychologically realistic style with Shakespeare's text revived, replacing George Granville's melodramatic adaptation The Jew of Venice. Kitty Clive plays the travesti role of Portia with Mrs Pritchard as Nerissa.
- March 14 – K. K. Theater an der Burg (Imperial Court Theatre) in Vienna opens.
- October 19 – David Garrick makes his London stage debut in the title role of Shakespeare's Richard III. His performance quickly packs theaters. His professional debut was earlier in the year at Ipswich, in Thomas Southerne's adaptation of Oroonoko.
- unknown date
  - The first translation of a Shakespeare play into German, Julius Caesar, is made by C. W. von Bork, using alexandrines.
  - Printer Robert Foulis sets up as a publisher in Edinburgh.

== New books ==
=== Fiction ===
- Anonymous
  - The Life of Pamela (parody of Richardson's Pamela)
  - Pamela Censured
- Charles Balguy (anonymous translator) – The Decameron
- Comte de Caylus – Les Féeries nouvelles
- Stephen Duck – Every Man in his Own Way
- Henry Fielding (as Mr. Conny Keyber) – An Apology for the Life of Mrs. Shamela Andrews
- Eliza Haywood – The Anti-Pamela; or Feign’d Innocence Detected
- Ludvig Holberg – Niels Klim's Underground Travels
- John Kelly – Pamela's Conduct in High Life (continuation of Pamela)
- Alexander Pope with John Gay and John Arbuthnot – Memoirs of the Extraordinary Life, Works, and Discoveries of Martinus Scriblerus
- Charles Povey – The Virgin in Eden (prose fiction)
- Samuel Richardson
  - Letters Written to and for Particular Friends (also known as Familiar Letters)
  - Pamela; or, Virtue Rewarded vols. iii – iv
- Hristofor Zhefarovich – Stemmatographia

=== Drama ===
- Anonymous – Pamela; or, Virtue Triumphant
- Robert Dodsley – The Blind Beggar of Bethnal Green (adapted from anonymous Elizabethan play)
- David Garrick – The Lying Valet
- William Hatchett – The Chinese Orphan: An Historical Tragedy (adapted from the 13th-century Chinese play The Orphan of Zhao; unperformed)
- John Kelly – The Levee
- Pierre-Claude Nivelle de La Chaussée – Mélanide
- Voltaire – Mahomet (Le fanatisme, ou Mahomet le Prophète, first performed)

=== Poetry ===
- Geoffrey Chaucer – The Canterbury Tales of Chaucer (new edition revives interest)
- William Shenstone – The Judgment of Hercules
- Edward Young – Poetical Works of the Reverend Edward Young
- Alonso Verdugo, third Earl of Torrepalma – Adonis
- John and Charles Wesley – A Collection of Psalms and Hymns

=== Non-fiction ===
- Thomas Betterton – The History of the English Stage, from the Restoration to the Present
- Thomas Francklin – Of the Nature of the Gods
- David Hume – Essays Moral and Political
- Real Academia Española – Ortografía
- Luigi Riccoboni – An Historical and Critical Account of the Theatres of Europe
- Martín Sarmiento – Memorias para la historia de la poesía y poetas españoles
- Emanuel Swedenborg – A Hieroglyphic Key to Natural and Spiritual Arcana by Way of Representation and Correspondences (written, published in 1784).
- Jonathan Swift
  - Dean Swift's Literary Correspondence (pirate edition by Edmund Curll, for which sued by Pope)
  - Some Free Thoughts on the Present State of Affairs
- Isaac Watts – The Improvement of the Mind
- Leonard Welsted – The Summum Bonum
- George Whitefield – A Letter to the Reverend John Wesley

== Births ==
- January 6 – Sarah Trimmer, English writer for children (died 1810)
- January 16 – Hester Thrale (Mrs Piozzi), English diarist and arts patron (died 1821)
- August 25 – Karl Friedrich Bahrdt, German theologian and adventurer (died 1792)
- October 4 – Edmond Malone, Irish Shakespearean editor (died 1812)
- October 18 – Pierre Choderlos de Laclos, French novelist (died 1803)
- October 28 – Johann August von Starck, German theologian and political writer (died 1816)

== Deaths ==
- January 9 – William Gwavas, English lawyer and writer in the Cornish language (born 1676)
- February 21 – Jethro Tull, English agricultural innovator and writer (born 1674)
- March 17 – Jean-Baptiste Rousseau, French dramatist and poet (born 1671)
- April 10 – Celia Fiennes, English travel writer (born 1662)
- July 30 – Thomas Emlyn, English Unitarian writer (born 1663)
- December 14 – Charles Rollin, French historian (born 1661)
- December 21 – Bernard de Montfaucon, French scholar and palaeographer (born 1655)
- unknown date – Anne Dick, Scottish comic poet and lampoonist (year of birth unknown)
