= Marriage plot =

Stock narrative plot

Marriage plot is a term used, often in academic circles, to categorize a storyline that recurs in novels most prominently and more recently in films. Until the expansion of the definition of marriage to include same-sex couples, this plot centered exclusively on the courtship rituals between a man and a woman and the obstacles that faced the potential couple on its way to the nuptial payoff. The marriage plot became a popular source of entertainment in the 18th and 19th centuries with the rise of the middle class novel. The foremost practitioners of the form include some of the more illustrious names in English letters, among them Samuel Richardson, Jane Austen, George Eliot and the Brontë sisters.

== Use in novels ==
Post-1980 deconstructionist criticism has highlighted how the plot was a profitable publishing and ideological production that served to ensure the ascendancy of the middle class. The marriage plot was the liberal age's reformulation of the medieval romance, which excluded all but aristocratic ladies and their chivalrous knights from its epics of love. The marriage plot promises to liberate romance by making it available to greater sections of society: the middle class and to some extent, the working classes, who are relegated to comic relief in 16th- and 17th-century theater, suddenly become serious moral subjects. Today, few doubt the ennobling qualities of love, but giving that nobility of soul to anyone but nobles was an innovation to be found foundationally in the marriage plot, perhaps pioneered by Richardson's Pamela, wherein a lowly but virtuous maid is raised beyond her birth through her insistent chastity and her subsequent marriage to the lordly Mr. B.

== Use in film ==
Film, which supplanted the novel as the most popular narrative form in the 20th century, did not abandon this innovation of the novel. Rather, the marriage plot has enjoyed a continued efflorescence, visible to this day in the popular film form known as the "romantic comedy". At its most formulaic, critics have asserted, the conventions of the marriage plot, with the cathartic closure that its marriage ending delivers to its believers, ultimately renounces politics and engagement in the world in favor of privacy and domestic bliss. We may see this, for instance, in the film You've Got Mail, which resolves the political opposition between mega-bookstore boss Tom Hanks and bookshop-around-the-corner owner, Meg Ryan, by uniting its lead characters in a union that effaces the unequal distribution of capital that originally put them at odds.

== See also ==
- The Marriage Plot, a 2011 novel by Jeffrey Eugenides.
