= Nanine =

1749 play

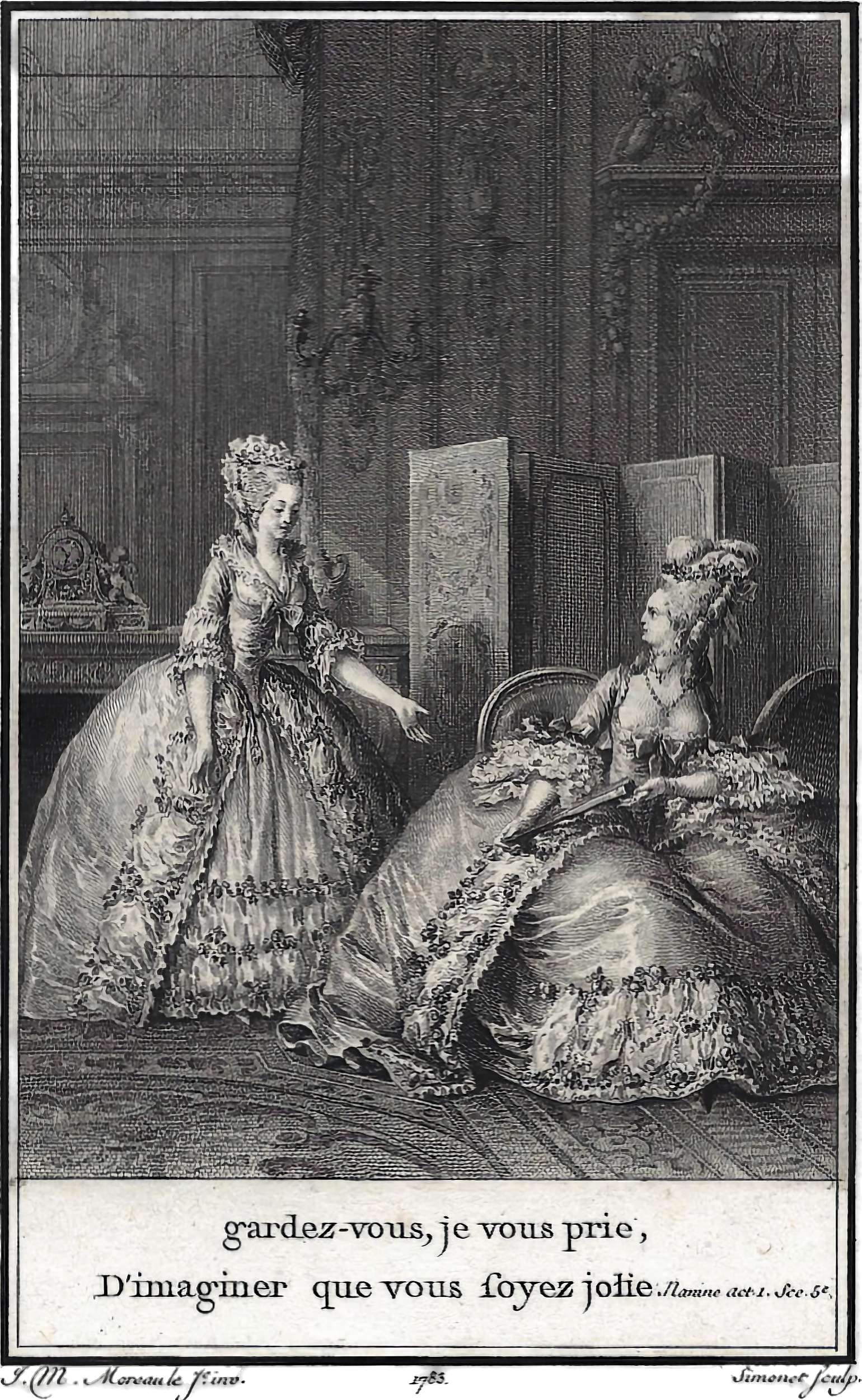
Voltaire's Nanine, or The Defeated Prejudice, Act 1, Scene 5

Nanine (French: Nanine, ou le Préjugé vaincu) is a 1749 play by the French writer Voltaire. The play is a very loose adaptation of Samuel Richardson's 1740 novel, Pamela. In his book, Richardson and the Philosophes, Professor James Fowler notes that in a letter to a friend, Voltaire declared that his intention in writing Nanine was to surpass a previous, poorly received adaptation of Pamela by Nivelle de la Chause.
