= Clara Linklater Thomson =

British writer, editor, and educator (1867-1934)

- Born: 1867; Hackney, London
- Died: November 1934 (aged 66–67)
- Education: Somerville College, Oxford
- Occupations: Writer, editor, educator
- Notable work: Samuel Richardson: A Biographical and Critical Study (1900)

Clara Linklater Thomson (1867 – 26 November 1934) was a British writer, editor, and educator, who wrote the first full biography of Samuel Richardson.

== Early life and education ==
Clara Linklater Thomson was born in 1867 in Hackney, London. She attended Somerville College, Oxford, and earned a secondary teachers' diploma from the University of Cambridge. She held teaching positions in Lancashire, and assistant headteacher roles at private schools in Solihull and Bayswater. She also served as an Examiner in English for the Central Welsh Board, London County Council, and University of London.

== Writing ==
In addition to her work as an educator, Thomson was a writer, who published many textbooks for young people and general readers. She has been called "a forceful and effective proponent of the interlace of literature and history".

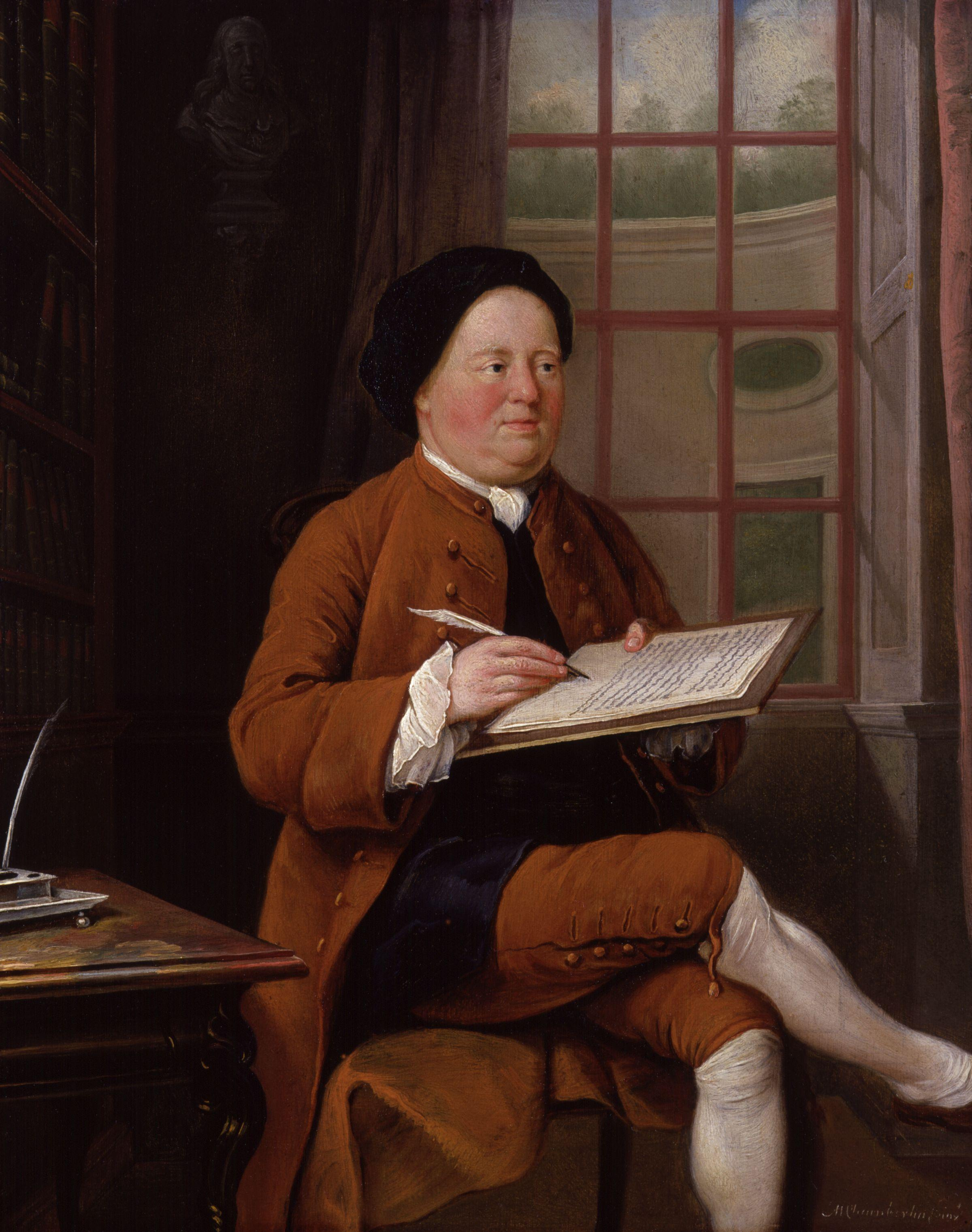
Samuel Richardson by Mason Chamberlin

In 1900, Thomson published Samuel Richardson: A Biographical and Critical Study, the first full biography of the writer. She drew on Anna Laetitia Barbauld’s edition of Richardson’s correspondence, published in 1804, as well as unpublished letters and other sources, and wrote of her belief that Richardson was "a writer whose importance in the development of English fiction would seem to render necessary a cheaper and more accessible biography". Two years later, Austin Dobson published Samuel Richardson (1902). It has since been written that Thomson and Dobson inaugurated "a century of scholarship that would reassert Richardson’s importance by correcting and enriching the biographical and bibliographical record and giving his works the close critical attention they demand". Scholar Thomas Lockwood has written that Thomson "brought Richardson back into view as a major novelist at a time when he was no longer being read".

On the publication of The Junior Temple Reader, a collection of folk and fairy tales, children's poetry, rhymes, and animal stories edited by Thomson and E. E. Speight, The Educational Times wrote:

This is an excellent book in every way... The choice has been made in a literary spirit and the illustrations old and new make the volume artistic as it is literary. Nothing could be better calculated to nurse children into a love of the best kind of reading and to cultivate in them the discriminating taste and sense of beauty which are to be found in an unspoiled child but which are often unaroused, and often overlaid. This Reader is a great improvement on many of existing collections of English extracts for schools and we should that it is certain to come into high favour.

In 1910, Thomson's Our Inheritance: A Brief Survey of English Literature was published: "an incisive overview of English literature", written for children.

Linklater edited the Carmelite Shakespeare series, published by Horace Marshall & Son, c. 1905–1925. The series was unusual both for its female editor, and the large number of women who edited individual texts. The Carmelite editions did not include extensive commentary on the texts, instead having a series of questions at the end of each act and edition.

In 1929, she published Jane Austen: A Survey.

== Select bibliography ==
- Poems by William Wordsworth, ed. (1892)
- The Adventures of Beowulf: translated from the Old English and adapted to the use of schools (1899)
- Samuel Richardson: A Biographical and Critical Study (1900)
- The Junior Temple Reader (1900)
- Historical Albums, ed. (1903)
- Tales from Chaucer, ed. (1903)
- Tales of the Middle Ages, ed. (1905)
- Stories from Germany, ed. (1909)
- Our Inheritance: A Brief Survey of English Literature (1910)
- A Short History of Canada (1911)
- Outlines of European History from 1789 to 1914 (1920)
- Historical Biography, ed. (1923)
- Précis Writing for Schools (1926)
- Jane Austen: A Survey (1929)
