= Joseph Andrews =

1742 novel by Henry Fielding

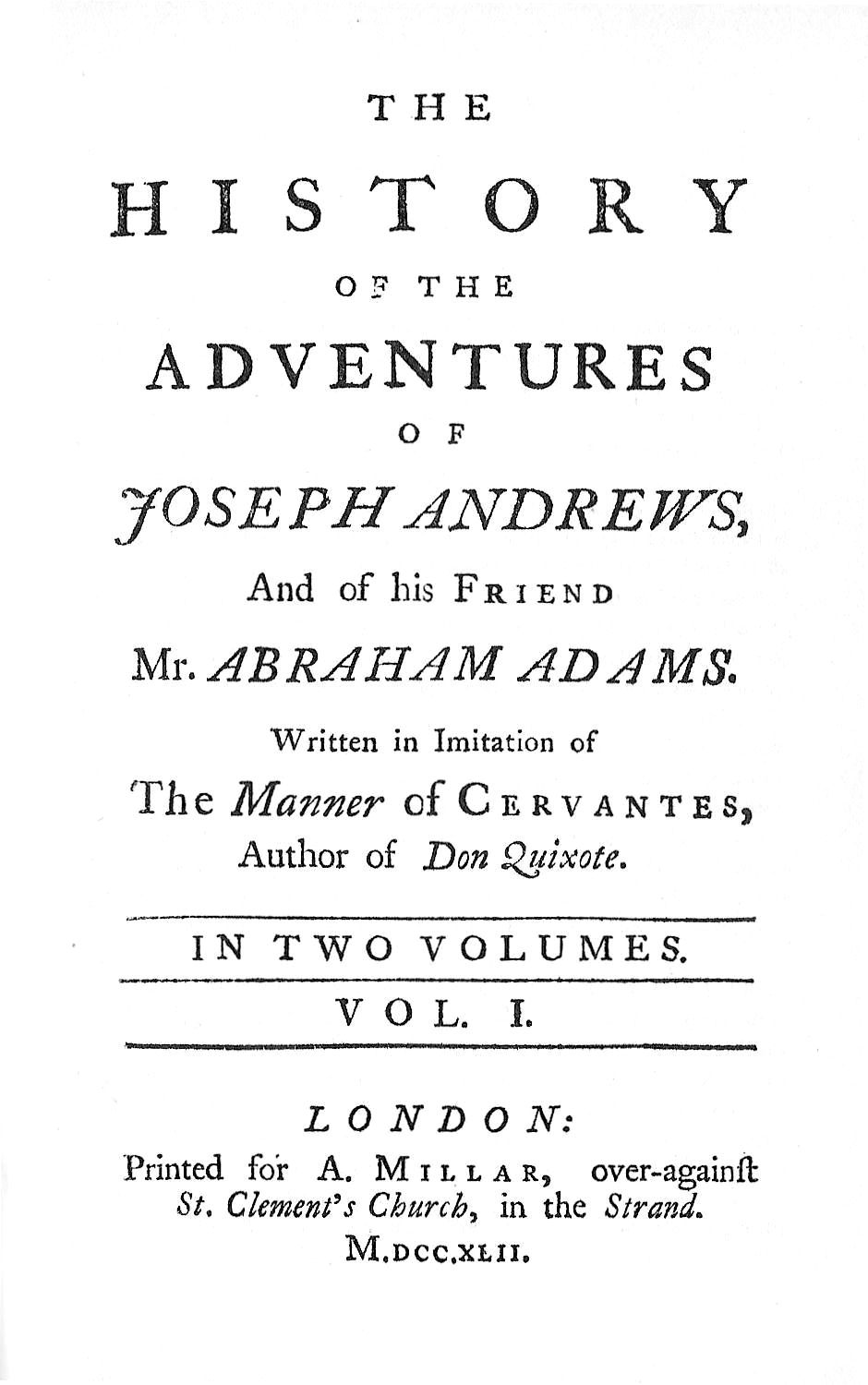
- Author: Henry Fielding
- Original title: The History of the Adventures of Joseph Andrews and His Friend, Mr. Abraham Adams
- Language: English
- Publication date: 1742
- Publication place: Britain
- Media type: print
- Preceded by: Shamela (1741)
- Followed by: The Life and Death of Jonathan Wild, the Great (1743)

The History of the Adventures of Joseph Andrews and of his Friend Mr. Abraham Adams, was the first full-length novel by the English author Henry Fielding to be published and among the early novels in the English language. Appearing in 1742 and defined by Fielding as a "comic epic poem in prose", it tells of a good-natured footman's adventures on the road home from London with his friend and mentor, the absent-minded parson Abraham Adams.

== Inspirations ==
The novel embodies a fusion of two competing aesthetics of 18th-century literature: the mock-heroic and neoclassical (and, by extension, aristocratic) approach of Augustans such as Alexander Pope and Jonathan Swift, and the popular, domestic prose fiction of novelists such as Daniel Defoe and Samuel Richardson.

The novel draws on various inspirations. Written "in imitation of the manner of Cervantes, the author of Don Quixote" (see title page on right), the work owes much of its humour to the techniques developed by Cervantes, and its subject-matter to the seemingly loose arrangement of events, digressions and lower-class characters to the genre of writing known as picaresque. In deference to the literary tastes and recurring tropes of the period, it relies on bawdy humour, an impending marriage and a mystery surrounding unknown parentage, but conversely is rich in philosophical digressions, classical erudition and social purpose.

== Background ==
Fielding's first venture into prose fiction came a year before with the publication in pamphlet form of Shamela, a travesty of the stylistic failings and moral hypocrisy that Fielding saw in Richardson's Pamela and a response to them. Richardson's epistolary tale of a resolute servant girl, armed only with her "virtue", battling against her master's attempts at seduction had become an overnight literary sensation in 1741. The implicit moral message—that a girl's chastity has eventual value as a commodity—and the awkwardness of the epistolary form in dealing with events, along with the triviality of the detail which the form necessitates, were some of the main targets of Fielding's parody.

Richardson would continue to be a target of Fielding's first novel, but the Pamela phenomenon was just one example of what he saw as a culture of literary abuses in the mid-18th century. Colley Cibber, poet laureate and mock-hero of Pope's Dunciad, is identified in the first chapter of the novel as another offender against propriety, morality and literary value.

The impetus for the novel, as Fielding claims in the preface, is the establishment of a genre of writing "which I do not remember to have been hitherto attempted in our language", defined as the "comic epic-poem in prose", a work of prose fiction, epic in length and variety of incident and character, in the hypothetical spirit of Homer's lost (and possibly apocryphal) comic poem Margites. He dissociates his fiction from the scandal-memoir and the contemporary novel. Book III describes the work as biography.

As becomes apparent from the first few chapters of the novel, in which Richardson and Cibber are parodied mercilessly, the real germ of Joseph Andrews is Fielding's objection to the moral and technical limitations of the popular literature of his day. While Shamela started and finished as a subversion of a rival work, in Joseph Andrews Fielding merely uses the perceived deprivation of popular literature as a springboard to conceive more fully his own philosophy of prose fiction.

== Plot summary ==
=== Book I ===
The novel begins with the affable, intrusive narrator outlining the nature of our hero. Joseph Andrews is the brother of Richardson's Pamela and is of the same rustic parentage and patchy ancestry. At the age of 10, he found himself tending animals as an apprentice to Sir Thomas Booby. In proving his worth as a horseman, he caught the eye of Sir Thomas's wife, Lady Booby, who now employs him (age 17) as her footman.

After Sir Thomas's death, Joseph finds his Lady's affections redoubled as she offers herself to him in her chamber while on a trip to London. In a scene analogous to many of Pamela's refusals of Mr. B in Richardson's novel, Lady Booby finds Joseph's Christian commitment to pre-marital chastity unwavering. After suffering the Lady's fury, Joseph sends a letter to his sister much like Pamela's anguished missives in her own novel. The Lady makes one last attempt at seduction before dismissing him from both his job and his lodgings.

As Joseph sets out from London by moonlight, the narrator introduces the novel's heroine, Fanny Goodwill, Joseph's true love. A poor, illiterate girl of 'extraordinary beauty' (I, xi), now living with a farmer close to Lady Booby's parish, she and Joseph had grown ever closer since their childhood, before their local parson and mentor Abraham Adams recommended that they postpone marriage until they have the means to live comfortably.

On his way to see Fanny, Joseph is mugged and laid up in a nearby inn where, by coincidence, he is reunited with Parson Adams, who is on his way to London to sell three volumes of his sermons. The thief is found and brought to the inn (only to escape later that night), and Joseph is reunited with his possessions. Adams and Joseph catch up with each other, and the parson, in spite of his own poverty, puts his last 9s 3½d at Joseph's disposal.

Joseph and Adams's stay in the inn is capped by one of many burlesque, slapstick digressions in the novel. Betty, the inn's 21-year-old chambermaid, had taken a liking to Joseph but is doomed to disappointment by Joseph's constancy to Fanny. The landlord, Mr. Tow-wouse, who had always admired Betty, saw this disappointment as an opportunity to take advantage. Locked in an embrace, they are discovered by the choleric Mrs. Tow-wouse, who chases the maid through the house until Adams restrains her. With the landlord promising not to transgress again, his lady allows him to make his peace at the cost of "quietly and contentedly bearing to be reminded of his transgressions, as a kind of penance, once or twice a day, during the residue of his life" (I, xviii).

=== Book II ===
During his stay in the inn, Adams's hopes for his sermons are mocked in a discussion with a travelling bookseller and another parson. Nevertheless, Adams remains resolved to continue his journey to London until it is revealed that his wife, deciding that he would be more in need of shirts than sermons on his journey, has neglected to pack them. The pair thus decide to return to the parson's parish: Joseph in search of Fanny, and Adams in search of his sermons.

With Joseph following on horseback, Adams finds himself sharing a stage coach with an anonymous lady and Madam Slipslop, an admirer of Joseph's and a servant of Lady Booby. When they pass the house of a teenage girl named Leonora, the anonymous lady is reminded of a story and begins one of the novel's three interpolated tales, "The History of Leonora, or the Unfortunate Jilt". This continues for a number of chapters, punctuated by the questions and interruptions of the other passengers.

After stopping at an inn, Adams relinquishes his seat to Joseph, and forgetting his horse, sets out ahead on foot. Finding himself some time ahead of his friend, Adams rests by the side of the road where he becomes so engaged in conversation with a fellow traveller that he misses the stage coach as it passes. As the night falls and Adams and the stranger discourse on courage and duty, a shriek is heard. The stranger, having seconds earlier lauded the virtues of bravery and chivalry, makes his excuses and flees the scene without turning back. Adams, however, rushes to the girl's aid and after a mock-epic struggle knocks her attacker unconscious. In spite of Adams's good intentions, he and the girl, who reveals herself to be none other than Fanny Goodwill (in search of Joseph after hearing of his mugging), find themselves accused of assault and robbery.

After some comic litigious wrangling before the local magistrate, the pair are eventually released and depart shortly after midnight in search of Joseph. They do not have to walk far before a storm forces them into the same inn that Joseph and Slipslop have chosen for the night. Slipslop, her jealousy ignited by seeing the two lovers reunited, departs angrily. When Adams, Joseph and Fanny come to leave the following morning, they find their departure delayed by an inability to settle the bill, and, with Adams's solicitations of a loan from the local parson and his wealthy parishioners failing, it falls on a local peddler to rescue the trio by loaning them his last 6s 6d.

The solicitations of charity that Adams is forced to make, and the complications which surround their stay in the parish, bring him into contact with many local squires, gentlemen and parsons, and much of the latter part of Book II is taken up by discussions of literature, religion, philosophy and trade that result.

=== Book III ===
The three depart the inn by night, and it is not long before Fanny needs to rest. With the party silent, they overhear approaching voices agree on "the murder of any one they meet" (III, ii) and flee to a local house. Inviting them in, the owner, Mr. Wilson, informs them that the gang of supposed murderers were in fact sheep-stealers, intent more on the killing of livestock than of Adams and his friends. The party being settled, Wilson begins the novel's most lengthy interpolat bears a notable resemblance to Fielding's own youth.

Wilson begins his tale in the first edition of 1742.

At the age of 16, Wilson's father died and left him a modest fortune. Finding himself the master of his destiny, he left school and travelled to London where he soon acquainted himself with the dress, manners and reputation for womanising necessary to consider himself a "beau". Wilson's life in the town is a façade: he writes love-letters to himself, obtains his fine clothes on credit, and is concerned more to be seen at the theatre than to watch the play. After two bad experiences with women, he is financially crippled, and much like Fielding, falls into the company of a group of Deists, freethinkers and gamblers. Finding himself in debt, he, like Fielding, turns to the writing of plays and hack journalism to alleviate his financial problems. He spends his last few pence on a lottery ticket, but with no reliable income, is soon forced to exchange it for food. While in jail for his debts, news reaches him that the ticket he gave away has won a £3,000 prize. His disappointment is short-lived, however, as the daughter of the winner hears of his plight, pays off his debts, and, after a brief courtship, agrees to marry him.

Wilson found himself at the mercy of many of the social ills that Fielding had written about in his journalism: the over-saturated and abused literary market, the exploitative state lottery, and regressive laws which sanctioned imprisonment for small debts. Having seen the corrupting influence of wealth and the town, he retires with his new wife to the rural solitude in which Adams, Fanny and Joseph find them. The only break in his contentment, and one which turns out to be significant to the plot, was the kidnapping of his eldest son, whom he has not seen since.

Wilson promises to visit Adams when he passes through his parish, and after another mock-epic battle on the road, this time with a party of hunting dogs, the trio proceed to the house of a local squire, where Fielding illustrates another contemporary social ill by having Adams subjected to a humiliating roasting. Enraged, the three depart to the nearest inn to find that, while at the squire's house, they had been robbed of their last half-guinea. To compound their misery, the squire has Adams and Joseph accused of kidnapping Fanny, to have them detained while he orders the abduction of the girl himself. She is rescued in transit, however, by Lady Booby's steward, Peter Pounce, and all four of them complete the remainder of the journey to Booby Hall together.

=== Book IV ===
On seeing Joseph arrive back in the parish, a jealous Lady Booby meanders through emotions as diverse as rage, pity, hatred, pride and love. The next morning Joseph and Fanny's banns are published and the Lady turns her anger onto Parson Adams, who is accommodating Fanny at his house. Finding herself powerless either to stop the marriage or to expel them from the parish, she enlists the help of Lawyer Scout, who brings a spurious charge of larceny against Joseph and Fanny to prevent, or at least postpone the wedding.

Three days later, the Lady's plans are foiled by the visit of her nephew, Mr Booby, and a surprise guest: Booby has married Pamela, granting Joseph a powerful new ally and brother-in-law. What is more, Booby is an acquaintance of the justice presiding over Joseph and Fanny's trial, and instead of Bridewell, has them committed to his own custody. Knowing of his sister's antipathy to the two lovers, Booby offers to reunite Joseph with his sister and take him and Fanny into his own parish and his own family.

In a discourse with Joseph on stoicism and fatalism, Adams instructs his friend to submit to the will of God and control his passions, even in the face of overwhelming tragedy. In the kind of cruel juxtaposition usually reserved for Fielding's less savoury characters, Adams is informed that his youngest son, Jacky, has drowned. After indulging his grief in a manner contrary to his lecture a few minutes previously, Adams is informed that the report was premature, and that his son has in fact been rescued by the same peddler that loaned him his last few shillings in Book II.

Lady Booby, in a last-ditch attempt to sabotage the marriage, brings a young beau named Didapper to Adams's house to seduce Fanny. Fanny is unmoved by his bold attempts at courtship. Didapper is too bold in his approach and provokes Joseph into a fight. The Lady and the beau depart in disgust, but the peddler, having seen the Lady, is compelled to relate a tale. The peddler had met his wife while in the army, and she died young. While on her death bed, she confessed that she once stole an exquisitely beautiful baby girl from a family named Andrews, and sold her on to Sir Thomas Booby, thus raising the possibility that Fanny may in fact be Joseph's sister. The company is shocked, but there is general relief that the crime of incest may have been narrowly averted.

The following morning, Joseph and Pamela's parents arrive, and together with the peddler and Adams, they piece together the question of Fanny's parentage. The Andrews identify her as their lost daughter, but have a twist to add to the tale. When Fanny was an infant, she was indeed stolen from her parents, but the thieves left behind a sickly infant Joseph in return, who was raised as their own. It is immediately apparent that Joseph is the above-mentioned kidnapped son of Wilson, and when Wilson arrives on his promised visit, he identifies Joseph by a birthmark on his chest. Joseph is now the son of a respected gentleman, Fanny an in-law of the Booby family, and the couple no longer suspected of being siblings. Two days later they are married by Adams in a humble ceremony, and the narrator, after bringing the story to a close, and in a disparaging allusion to Richardson, reassures readers that there will be no sequel.

== Stage adaptation ==
Joseph Andrews, a stage adaptation of the first and fourth books of the novel, was written by Samuel Jackson Pratt and performed on 20 April 1778 at the Theatre Royal, Drury Lane. The role of Fanny was played by Mary Robinson.

== Film adaptation ==
The novel was adapted for the screen in 1977 by Tony Richardson, Allan Scott and Chris Bryant. Richardson directed the critically well-received work, with Michael Hordern as Adams, Peter Firth as Joseph, and Lady Booby played by Swedish-born Ann-Margret, who received a Golden Globe nomination for the role. The tag line ("The story of a young, English footman who served the Lady Booby but loved the little Fanny") suggests how it captures some of the source material's bawdy humour. It was released on region 1 DVD in 2003.

== Radio adaptations ==
A four-part radio adaption dramatised by John Scotney was broadcast on BBC Radio 4 in April 1986.

A two-part adaptation, Joseph Andrews Remixed, was broadcast on BBC Radio 4 in July 2021. It was written by Shaun McKenna and incorporated a fictionalization of Fielding writing the novel with the help of his wife whilst the couple struggled for money in fear of retribution for some of Fielding's anonymous satires against the Tory government.

== Bibliography ==
=== Editions ===
The Wesleyan Edition of the Works of Henry Fielding is the standard collection of Fielding's texts. Reliable paperback editions include:

- Fielding, Henry Joseph Andrews with Shamela and Related Writings. Edited by Homer Goldberg. (New York: W. W. Norton & Co., 1987) ISBN 9780393955552. Based on the Wesleyan text (see above). Includes selections of critical essays and contextual material.
- Fielding, Henry Joseph Andrews and Shamela. Edited by Judith Hawley. (Harmondsworth: Penguin, 1999) ISBN 9780140433869. The copy text of this edition is based on the second edition released on 10 June 1742.
- Fielding, Henry Joseph Andrews and Shamela. Edited by Thomas Keymer. (Oxford: World's Classics, Oxford University Press, 2008) ISBN 9780199536986. Based on the Wesleyan text.

=== Criticism ===
- Battestin, Martin The Moral Basis of Fielding’s Art: A Study of Joseph Andrews. (Connecticut: Wesleyan University Press, 1959) ISBN 9780819560384.
- Goldberg, Homer The Art of Joseph Andrews (Chicago: University of Chicago Press, 1969) ISBN 9780226300900.
- Watt, Ian The Rise of the Novel. (London: Pimlico, 2000) ISBN 9780712664271.
