= An Apology for the Life of Mrs. Shamela Andrews =

1741 novel by Henry Fielding

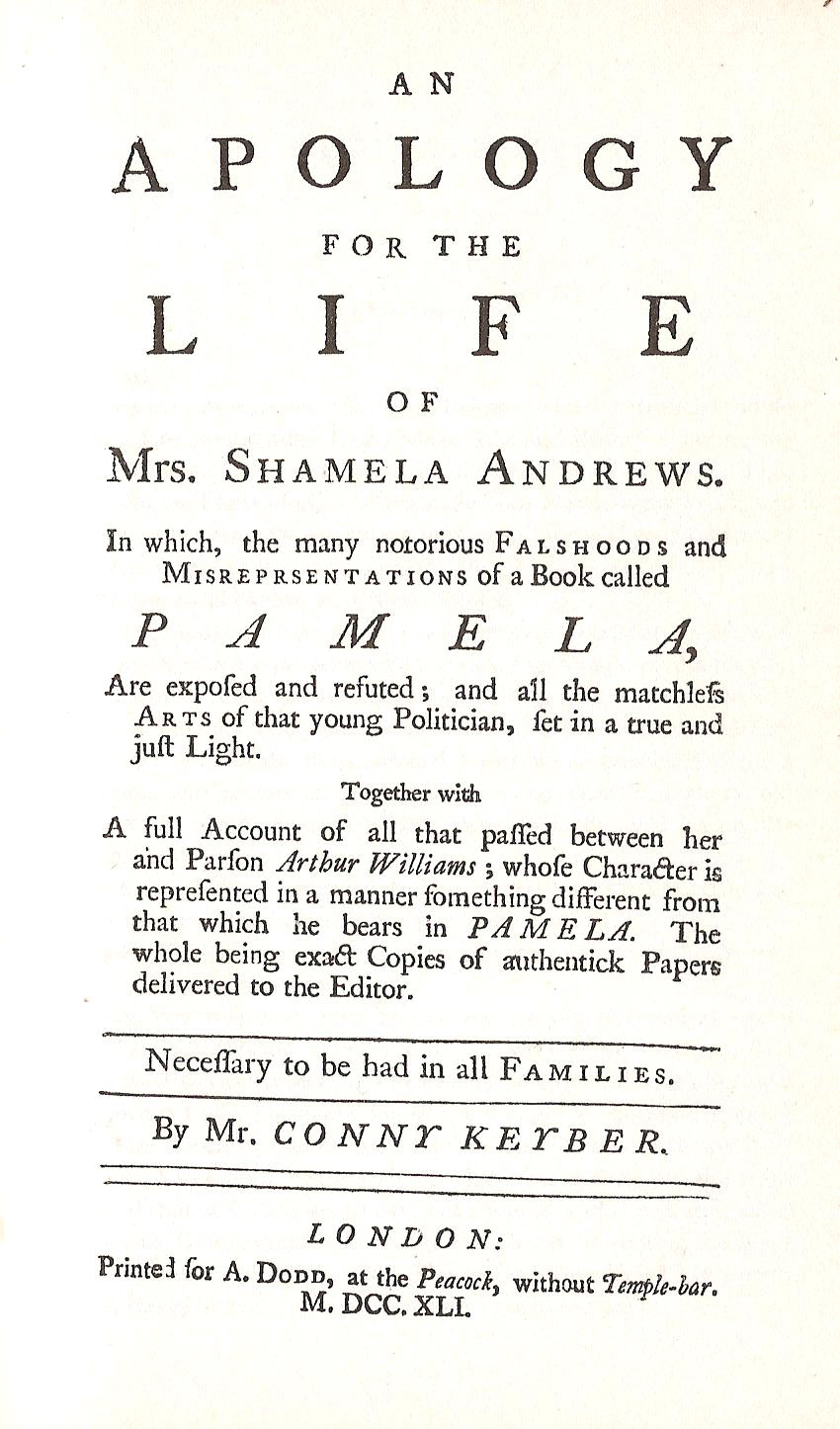
- Author: Mr. Conny Keyber
- Language: English
- Genre: Satire, Parody
- Publisher: A. Dodd
- Publication date: 4 April 1741
- Publication place: England
- Media type: Print (hardback and paperback)
- Preceded by: The Historical Register for the Year 1736 (1737)
- Followed by: Joseph Andrews (1742)

An Apology for the Life of Mrs. Shamela Andrews, or simply Shamela, as it is more commonly known, is a satirical burlesque novella by English writer Henry Fielding. It was first published in April 1741 under the name of Mr. Conny Keyber. Fielding never admitted to writing the work, but it is widely considered to be his. It is a direct attack on the then-popular novel Pamela (1740) by Fielding's contemporary and rival Samuel Richardson and is composed, like Pamela, in epistolary form.

== Publishing history ==
Shamela was originally published anonymously on 4 April 1741 and sold for one shilling and sixpence. A second edition came out on 3 November that same year which was partly reimpressed and partly reset where emendations were made.

A pirated edition was printed in Dublin in 1741 as well. Reprint editions have subsequently appeared as texts for academic study.

== Plot summary ==
Shamela is written as a shocking revelation of the true events which took place in the life of Pamela Andrews, the main heroine of Pamela. Shamela starts with a letter from a Parson Thomas Tickletext to his friend, Parson J. Oliver, in which Tickletext is completely smitten by Pamela, and insists Oliver gives the book a read. In response, however, Oliver reveals her true nature is not so virtuous, and he has letters to prove her real character. The rest of the story is told in letters between the major characters, such as Shamela, her mother, Henrietta Maria Honora Andrews—who is unwed in this version—Master Booby, Mrs. Jewkes, Mrs. Jervis, and Rev. Arthur Williams, much like in Pamela. In this version, however, her father is not present at all. In Shamela we also learn that, instead of being a kind, humble and chaste servant-girl, Pamela (whose true name turns out to be Shamela) is in fact a wicked and lascivious creature—daughter to a London prostitute—who schemes to entrap her master, Squire Booby, into marriage. Later, however, it was discovered Shamela was having an affair with the Reverend. The verbal and physical violence of Richardson's "Mr. B" (whose name is revealed to be Booby) to his servant maid are hyperbolized, rendering their supposed love-match contemptible and absurd.

== Themes and style ==
The novel is a sustained parody of, and direct response to, the stylistic failings and moral hypocrisy that Fielding saw in Richardson's Pamela. Reading Shamela amounts to re-reading Pamela through a deforming magnifying glass; Richardson's text is rewritten in a way that reveals its hidden implications, to subvert and desecrate it.

Richardson's epistolary tale of a resolute servant girl, armed only with her 'virtue' to battle against her master's attempts at seduction, had become an overnight literary sensation in 1741. The implicit moral message – that a girl's chastity has eventual value as a commodity – as well as the awkwardness of the epistolary form in dealing with ongoing events, and the triviality of the detail which the form necessitates, were some of the main targets of Fielding's travesty.

Recent criticism has explored the ways in which Pamela in fact dramatises its own weaknesses. From this perspective, Fielding's work may be seen as a development of possibilities already encoded in Richardson's work, rather than a simple attack. Another novel by Fielding parodying Pamela, albeit not so explicitly, is The History of the Adventures of Joseph Andrews and his Friend, Mr. Abraham Adams (February 1742), more commonly known as Joseph Andrews.

Also, as the title and paratexts make clear, Shamela is also a spoof against Colley Cibber's Apology (An Apology for the Life of Colley Cibber, Comedian), published the same year, as well as a dig at Conyers Middleton, whose Life of Cicero, written at the request of John Hervey, 2nd Baron Hervey, was perceived by opposition authors as a panegyric of sorts for the controversial administration of Robert Walpole.

Some critics have pointed out that the popularity of Richardson's Pamela and Cibber's Apology alerted Fielding to the possibilities of prose fiction for influencing the taste and morals of his contemporaries. Shamela, then, went far beyond satirizing Richardson and his supporters, for it allowed Fielding to rework, now in novelistic format, the topics that fascinated him as a satirical playwright, before the Licensing Act drove him away from drama.

== See also ==
- Haywood, Eliza (1741), The Anti-Pamela; or, Feign'd Innocence Detected — another satire of Richardson's Pamela
