= The Anti-Pamela; or, Feign'd Innocence Detected =

1741 novel by Eliza Haywood

The Anti-Pamela; or Feign'd Innocence Detected
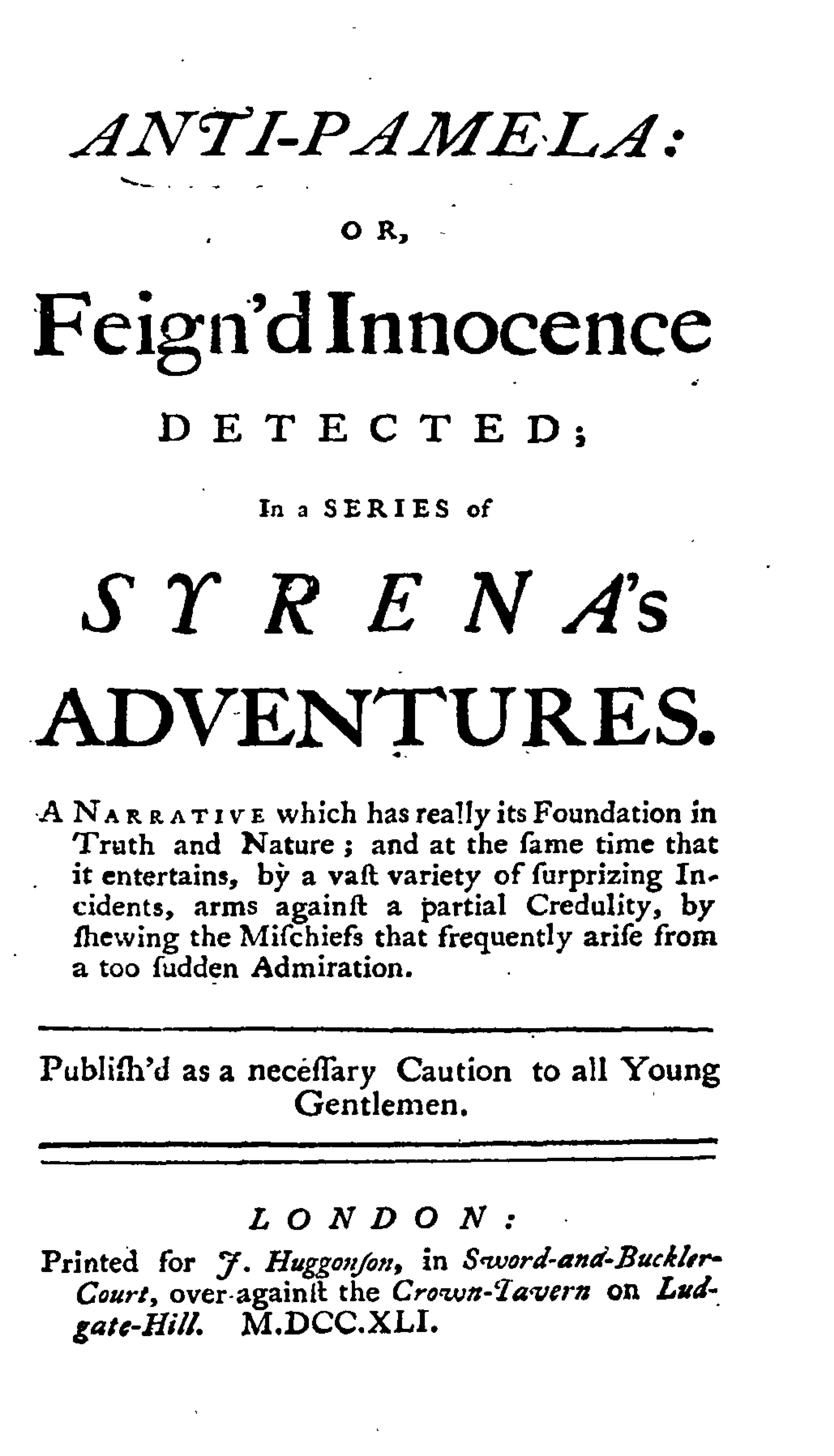
- Title page of the first edition.
- Author: Eliza Haywood
- Language: English
- Genre: Parody novel
- Publication date: 1741
- Publication place: England

The Anti-Pamela; or Feign'd Innocence Detected is a 1741 novel written by Eliza Haywood as a satire of the 1740 novel Pamela; or, Virtue Rewarded by Samuel Richardson. It has also been presented with the subtitle "Mock-Modesty Display'd and Punish'd."

== Response to Pamela ==
The Anti-Pamela is one of several novels (such as Shamela by Henry Fielding) written in response to Richardson's novel Pamela, satirising the innocence of his character Pamela Andrews. The original Pamela is presented as a virtuous working-class woman who reforms a debauched gentleman and wins his love; her virtue is rewarded with marriage. Fiction written in response to this novel typically reframes Pamela's actions to instead present her as a manipulative social climber. Haywood's character generally follows this mold, though she is much less licentious than Fielding's Shamela.

Haywood's novel is generally seen as condemning Richardson's Pamela character for using her sexuality for self-interested ends. Some scholars also interpret the novel as condemning the idea of social mobility itself, and supporting the idea that there is a natural ruling elite whose innate moral superiority can never be matched by lower classes.

== Plot ==
Unlike Shamela, which retells the same plot as Pamela, Haywood's novel follows the life of a Pamela-esque character, Syrena Tricksy, in her own storyline. Syrena attempts to use her performance of innocence to become a prosperous noblewoman. She tries several different schemes, presenting herself to different men as a unmarried gentlewoman, a married gentlewoman, a libertine, a mistress, a poor widow, or a rich widow, based on what seems likely to serve her aims. However, these schemes are always foiled at the last minute, either due to coincidence or due to Syrena's carelessness. For example, she is almost successful in marrying a rich old gentleman, until his son visits and reveals that Syrena has pursued both father and son. As the novel progresses, Syrena's desperate attempts at upward social mobility instead result in downward mobility, as she seduces men with less and less wealth.

== Editions ==
The Anti-Pamela was out of print until the publication of a 2004 Broadview Press edition.

== See also ==
- Pamela; or, Virtue Rewarded – a 1740 novel by Samuel Richardson
- Shamela – a 1741 novel by Henry Fielding
- The True Anti-Pamela – a 1741 memoir by James Parry, organist of Ross in Herefordshire, of his affair with Mary Powell.
