= Charles Povey =

British writer and entrepreneur (1652–1743)

Charles Povey (1652? – 4 May 1743) was a British pamphleteer and entrepreneur, who challenged the Royal Mail's postal monopoly by running the "Halfpenny Carriage", a local London postal system similar to William Dockwra's Penny Post. He founded the first joint-stock company for fire insurance, the Exchange House Fire Office later the "Sun Fire Office" that remains in business today as the RSA Insurance Group.

== Insurance ==
Founding the Exchange House Fire Office in 1708, Povey was not long involved with it. In 1709 it became the Company of London Insurers. It was called the "Sun Fire Office", after the fire mark used by Povey. A deal of 1710 saw Povey sell out. The company innovated by insuring both houses and goods.

The Sun Fire Office was soon followed by other such companies, which grew more rapidly at the outset. Shares in it were acquired by Royal Exchange Assurance in 1720. Yet the Sun mark lasted for centuries.

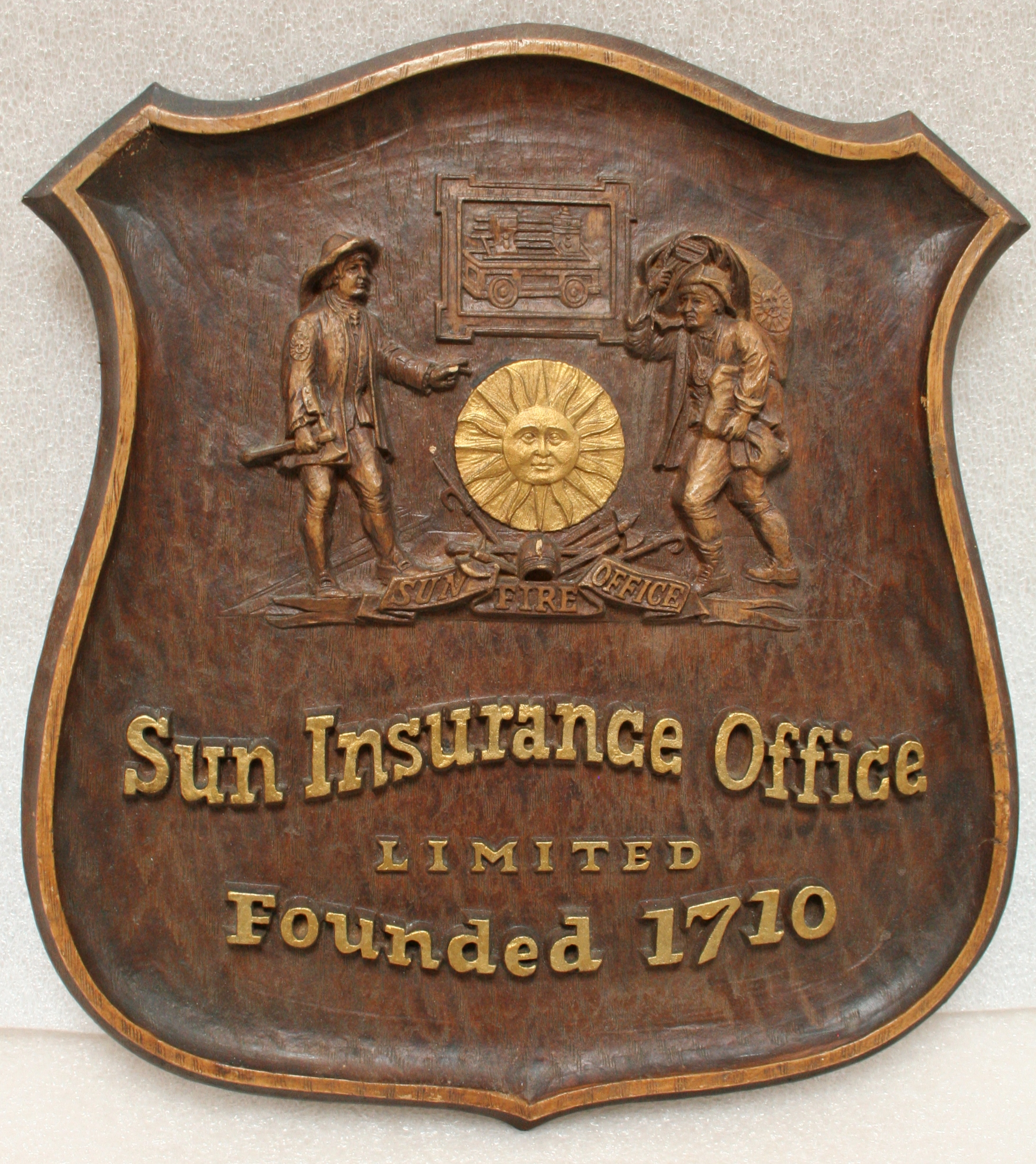
Sun Insurance Office sign from the 1880s

== The Halfpenny Carriage ==
The Halfpenny Carriage was a postal service run by Povey in the London area from October 1709, in competition with and undercutting the official Post Office monopoly, which charged a penny per letter. It was closed down by the government, after seven months. Povey was fined, but his systematic use of bellmen was adopted by the Post Office.

== Life ==
Povey was the brother of the Rev. Josiah Povey, parish priest of Telscombe. During the reign of James II of England, he was jailed for writing against the king. At the end of the 17th century, he took part in the coal trade. Some years later he operated as a middleman and broker in his Traders' Exchange House, Hatton Garden. The insurance company and its promotional newspaper, mostly on trade topics, were originally offshoots of a labour brokerage he ran.

== Publications ==
Amongst Povey's publications are the following:

- A Challenge to all Jacobites (1689)
- A Challenge in vindication of the Revolution (1690)
- Proposals for raising One Thousand Pounds (1699)
- A Discovery of Indirect Practices in the Coal Trade (1700)
- The unhappiness of England, as to its Trade by Sea and Land truly stated (1701)
- Meditations of a Divine Soul (1703)
- Holy Thoughts of a God-made Man (1704)
- An inquiry into the miscarriages of the four last years reign (1714)
- A tender and hearty address to all the freeholders and other electors of members for the ensuing Parliament of Great Britain & Ireland. (1714)
- English inquisition: or, Money rais'd by the new secret extent law, without act of Parliament (1718)
- Britain's Scheme to make a New Coin of Gold and Silver to give in Exchange for Paper-Money and South-Sea Stock (1720)
- The Secret History of the Sun Fire Office (1733)
- Memorial to obtain Right and Property as promised in Her Majesty's Speech from the Throne, humbly presented to the King, Lords and Commons for the restoration of an Estate and Fortune taken away by the Crown and Parliament, contrary to the Laws of Great Britain (1737)
- The Torments after Death (1740)
- The Virgin in Eden, or the State of Innocency- . . . Presenting a Nobleman, a Student, and Heiress, on their progress from Sodom to Canaan (1741)
- WorldCat Charles Povey search result
