= Pamela; or, Virtue Rewarded =

1740 novel by Samuel Richardson

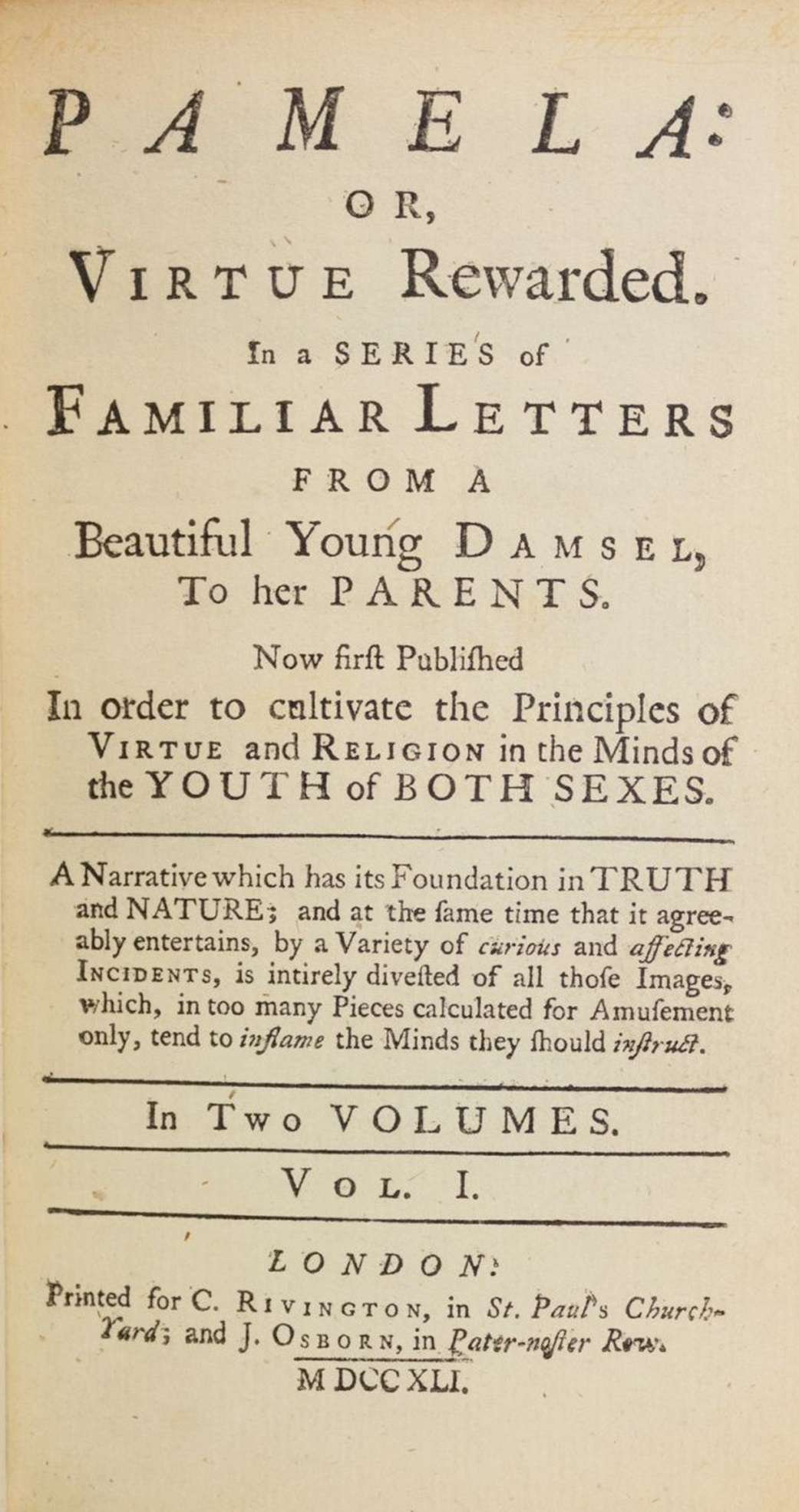
- First edition title page
- Author: Samuel Richardson
- Language: English
- Genre: Epistolary novel Psychological
- Publisher: Messrs Rivington & Osborn
- Publication date: 6 November, 1740
- Publication place: England
- Followed by: Pamela in her Exalted Condition

Pamela; or, Virtue Rewarded is an epistolary novel first published anonymously in 1740 by the English writer Samuel Richardson. Considered one of the first true English novels, it serves as Richardson's version of conduct literature about marriage.

Pamela tells the story of a fifteen-year-old maidservant named Pamela Andrews, whose employer, Mr. B, a wealthy landowner, makes unwanted and inappropriate advances towards her after the death of his mother. Pamela strives to reconcile her strong religious training with her desire for the approval of her employer in a series of letters and, later in the novel, journal entries all addressed to her impoverished parents. After various unsuccessful attempts at seduction, a series of sexual assaults and an extended period of kidnapping, the rakish Mr. B eventually reforms and makes Pamela a sincere proposal of marriage. In the novel's second part, Pamela marries Mr. B and tries to acclimatise to her new position in upper-class society.

The full title, Pamela; or, Virtue Rewarded, makes plain Richardson's moral purpose. A best-seller of its time, Pamela was widely read but was also criticised for its perceived licentiousness and disregard for class barriers. Furthermore, Pamela was an early commentary on domestic violence and brought into question the dynamic line between male aggression and a contemporary view of love. Moreover, Pamela, despite the controversies, shed light on social issues that transcended the novel for the time such as gender roles, early false-imprisonment, and class barriers present in the eighteenth century.

Richardson highlights a theme of naivety, illustrated through the eyes of Pamela. Richardson paints Pamela herself as innocent and meek and further contributes to the theme of her being short-sighted to emphasize the ideas of childhood innocence and naivety.

Two years after the publication of Pamela; or, Virtue Rewarded, Richardson published a sequel, Pamela in her Exalted Condition (1742). He revisited the theme of the rake in his Clarissa; or, The History of a Young Lady (1748), and sought to create a "male Pamela" in Sir Charles Grandison (1753).

Since Ian Watt discussed it in The Rise of the Novel: Studies in Defoe, Richardson and Fielding in 1957, literary critics and historians have generally agreed that Pamela played a critical role in the development of the novel in English.

== Plot summary ==
=== Volume 1 ===
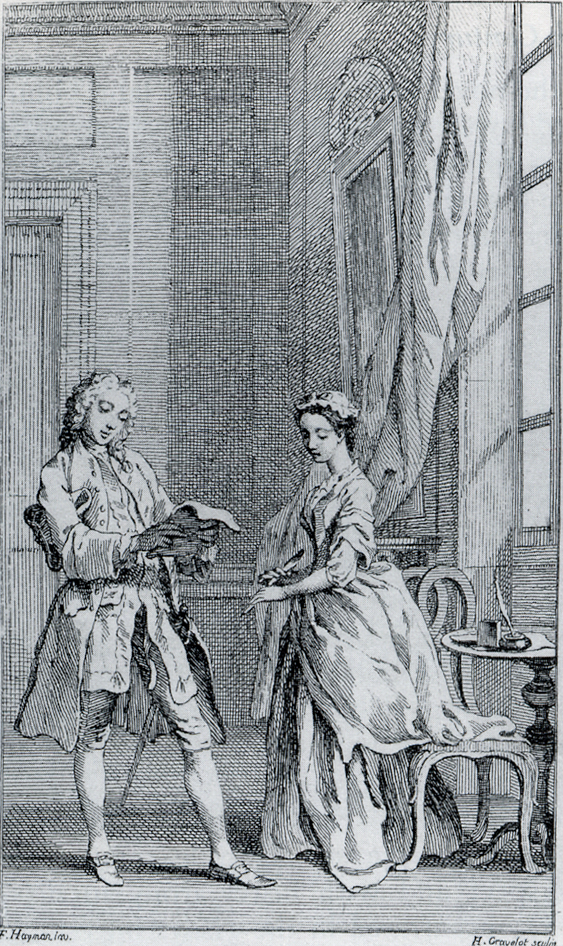
A plate from the 1742 deluxe edition of Richardson's Pamela; or, Virtue Rewarded showing Mr. B intercepting Pamela's first letter home to her mother

Pamela Andrews is a pious, virtuous fifteen-year-old, the daughter of impoverished labourers, who works for Lady B as a maid in her Bedfordshire estate. After Lady B's death, her son, Mr. B, inherits the estate, and begins to pay Pamela romantic attention: first gifting her his mother's fine clothes, and then attempting to seduce her. Pamela rejects Mr. B's advances multiple times by fleeing and locking herself in her bedroom. In one instance, she faints, and finds the laces of her stays have been cut.

When Mr. B attempts to pay her to keep his failed seduction secret, she confides in her best friend and housekeeper of the estate, Mrs. Jervis. Later, Mr. B hides in Pamela's closet and tries to kiss her when she undresses for bed, which causes Pamela to consider leaving her position and returning to her parents to preserve her innocence. She is insistent on remaining at the estate to finish embroidering a waistcoat for Mr. B, hoping that by doing so he will let her leave on good terms.

Angry at Pamela for telling Mrs. Jervis of his attempted seductions, Mr. B informs Pamela that he intends to marry her off to Mr. Williams, his chaplain in Lincolnshire, and gives money to her parents to persuade them to give consent. Pamela refuses the engagement and decides to leave the estate, but Mr. B intercepts her letters to her parents and tells them she is having an affair with a poor clergyman and that he will send her to a safe place to preserve her chastity. Pamela is forcibly taken to Mr. B's Lincolnshire Estate by Mr. B's servant Monsieur Colbrand, where she begins a journal with the intention of sending it to her parents.

The Lincolnshire housekeeper, Mrs. Jewkes, is "odious" and "unwomanly", devoted to Mr. B, and keeps Pamela as her bedfellow. Mr. B promises that he will not approach Pamela without her consent and stays away from the estate for some time.

As Pamela is mistreated by Mrs. Jewkes, she begins communicating with Mr. Williams by letters, which they leave for one another in the gardens. After Mrs. Jewkes beats Pamela when Pamela calls her a "Jezebel", Mr. Williams entreats the village gentry for help. They pity Pamela, but they too are loyal to Mr. B, and are convinced a seduction would either not occur or be inconsequential because of Pamela's low social standing. Mr. Williams proposes marriage to her to help her escape the estate and Mr. B's advances but shortly afterward is attacked and beaten by robbers. Pamela attempts to flee home to her parents, but is terrified by two cows, which she mistakes for bulls. Mr. Williams accidentally reveals his correspondence with Pamela to Mrs. Jewkes and so Mr. B has him arrested and announces that he will marry Pamela to one of his servants. Desperate, Pamela attempts to escape by climbing a wall, and, injured, gives up.

Mr. B returns and offers Pamela a list of conditions that he would meet, should she accept his hand in marriage, but she refuses, citing her reluctance to think above her social station to become his mistress. In league with Mrs. Jewkes, Mr. B molests Pamela while she is in bed and he is dressed as the housemaid Nan. Pamela is sent into hysteria and seems likely to die. Mr. B repents and is kinder in his seductions, but Pamela implores him to stop altogether. Mr. B implies that he loves Pamela but will not marry her because of her social status.

Pamela has hidden a parcel of letters to her parents in the garden, but they are seized by Mrs. Jewkes, who gives them to Mr. B. He sympathises with Pamela on reading her account of their relationship, and once again proposes. Pamela, still doubtful of his intentions, begs him to let her return. Though vexed, he does so to her surprise.

=== Volume 2 ===
On leaving for home, Pamela is strangely sad and on her way home he sends her an apologetic letter that prompts her to realise that she is, in fact, in love. When she hears that he is ill, she returns to him. The two reunite and become engaged, and Pamela explains that she rejected Mr. B's advances because she feared that he would attempt to take advantage of her without marrying her.

Mr. Williams is released from prison, and the neighbouring gentry come to the estate and admire Pamela. Her father arrives at the estate and fears that she accepted Mr. B's proposal under duress but is reassured when he sees her happy. Pamela and Mr. B wed. When Mr. B leaves to attend to a sick man, his sister, Lady Davers, arrives at the estate and threatens Pamela and calls her marriage a sham. Pamela escapes by the window and is taken by Colbrand to Mr. B. The following day, Lady Davers enters their bedroom without permission and reveals that Mr. B previously seduced a girl, Sally Godfrey, and had a child with her.

Pamela reconciles the furious siblings, who return to Bedfordshire. Pamela rewards her friends and servants with money and forgives her father for attempting to end her engagement. They visit a farmhouse where they meet Mr. B's daughter and learn that her mother now lives married in Jamaica. Pamela proposes taking the girl home with them. The neighbourhood gentry, who once despised Pamela, now praise her.

== Characters ==
- Pamela Andrews: The novel's fifteen-year-old pious protagonist, who narrates the novel. She is passed on by her deceased employer to her son, Mr. B, who puts her through numerous sexual advances and even assault before she eventually concedes and marries him. Pamela originally came to the estate as a young servant looking to make money to send to her parents back home. Pamela is also noted to value her virtue before anything else. Her virtue and her moral beliefs become her controlling purpose which creates tension between her and her employer who was making multiple advances towards her.
- John and Elizabeth Andrews: Pamela's father and mother to whom Pamela's letters are addressed. Pamela hears only from her father, who alone of her parents appears in the novel.
- Mr. Williams: A young clergyman who attempts to help Pamela escape Mr. B's estate, and delivers letters to her family. He offers to marry Pamela to secure her from Mr. B's unwanted advances, but she denies him. Mr. B has Williams taken away to debtors' prison.
- Mr. B: Pamela's lascivious and abusive employer, who falls in love with and eventually marries her.
- Lady B: Deceased; Mr. B's and Lady Daver's mother, Pamela's late employer.
- Lady Davers: Mr. B's sister. She initially disapproves of Pamela's union with Mr. B for her lower class but eventually warms to the modest girl.
- Mrs. Jervis: The elderly housekeeper of Mr. B's Bedfordshire estate. She becomes one of Pamela's best friends, as stated in a letter to her parents. Despite her good intentions, she is nearly ineffectual in preventing Mr. B's unwanted advances on Pamela.
- Mrs. Jewkes: The housekeeper of Mr. B's Lincolnshire estate. She holds Pamela at the estate according to Mr. B's wishes and is completely dutiful to him. She warms to Pamela once she marries Mr. B.
- Sally Godfrey: Mr. B's mistress from his college days. She has a daughter by Mr. B but removed to Jamaica and married another.
- Monsieur Colbrand: Helps in keeping Pamela at the Lincolnshire estate but proves to be protecting her and helps her escape from Lady Davers.
- Miss Goodwin: The daughter of Mr. B and Sally Godfrey.

== Genre ==
=== Conduct books and the novel ===
Richardson began writing Pamela after he was approached by two book-sellers, who requested that he make them a book of letter templates. Richardson accepted the request, but only if the letters had a moral purpose. As Richardson was writing, the series of letters turned into a story. Writing in a new form, the novel, Richardson attempted both to instruct and to entertain. Richardson wrote Pamela as a conduct book, a sort of manual that codified social and domestic behavior of men, women, and servants, as well as a narrative to provide a more morally-concerned literature option for young audiences. Ironically, some readers focused more upon the bawdy details of Richardson's novel, resulting in some negative reactions and even a slew of literature satirizing Pamela and so he published a clarification in the form of A Collection of the Moral and Instructive Sentiments, Maxims, Cautions, and Reflexions, Contained in the Histories of Pamela, Clarissa, and Sir Charles Grandison in 1755. Many novels, from the mid-18th century and well into the 19th, followed Richardson's lead and claimed legitimacy through the ability to teach as well as amuse.

=== Epistolary ===
Epistolary novels, novels written as series of letters, were popular in the eighteenth century but sustained popularity in the nineteenth and twentieth centuries as well. Fictional epistolary narratives originated in their early form in 16th-century England; however, they acquired wider renown with the publication of Richardson's Pamela.

In the novel, Pamela writes two kinds of letters. At the beginning, while she decides how long to stay on at Mr. B's after his mother's death, she tells her parents about her various moral dilemmas and asks for their advice. After Mr. B. abducts her and imprisons her in his country house, she continues to write to her parents, but since she does not know if they will ever receive her letters, the writings are also considered a diary. Eventually, Mr. B finds out about Pamela's letters to her parents and encroaches upon her privacy by refusing to let her send them.

The plot of Pamela; or, Virtue Rewarded is bound up in the back-and-forth between Pamela and Mr. B as the former eludes Mr. B's attempt and the latter, growing frustrated, continues in his attempts. According to Barbara Belyea, Pamela's "duty to resist him without compromise has become a duty to obey him without question" (411). In other words, readers of Pamela experience the trajectory of the plot, and the romance between the hero and heroine, as a back-and-forth, pendulum-like swing. Belyea claims this oscillation persists through readers' interpretations as Pamela sustains the formative action of the plot through the letters she writes to her parents detailing her ordeal: "Within the fictional situation, the parents' attitude to their child's letters is the closest to that of Richardson's reader. The parents' sympathy for the heroine and anxiety for a happy end anticipate the reader's attitude to the narrative" (413). Pamela's parents are the audience for her letters and their responses (as recipients of the letters) mimic what Belyea argues are readers' responses to Richardson's novel. Arguably, Richardson's Pamela invokes an audience within an audience and "[c]areful attention to comments and letters by other characters enables the reader to perceive that Pamela's passionate defence of her chastity is considered initially as exaggerated, fantastic--in a word, romantic" (412). Pamela; or, Virtue Rewarded demonstrates morality and realism as bound up in individuals’ identities and social class because of its form as an epistolary novel.

== Literary significance and criticism ==
=== Reception ===
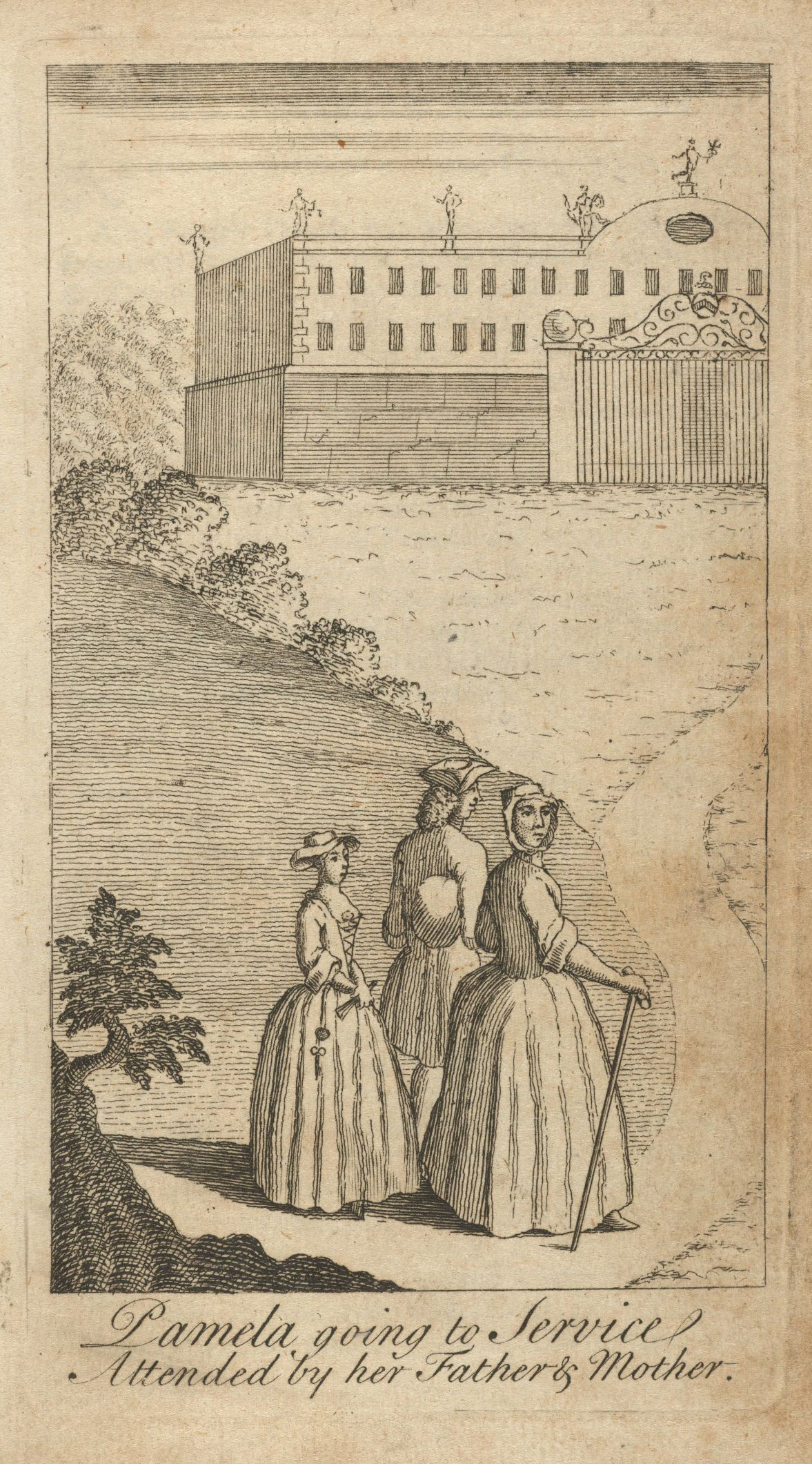
Illustration from a 1741 pirated edition

Considered by many literary experts as the first English novel, Pamela was a best-seller of its time. It was read by countless buyers of the novel and was also read in groups. An anecdote, which has been repeated in varying forms since 1777, described the novel's reception in an English village: "The blacksmith of the village had got hold of Richardson's novel of Pamela, or Virtue Rewarded, and used to read it aloud in the long summer evenings, seated on his anvil, and never failed to have a large and attentive audience.... At length, when the happy turn of fortune arrived, which brings the hero and heroine together, and sets them living long and happily... the congregation were so delighted as to raise a great shout, and procuring the church keys, actually set the parish bells ringing."

The novel was also integrated into sermons as an exemplar. It was even an early "multimedia" event, producing Pamela-themed cultural artefacts such as prints, paintings, waxworks, a fan, and a set of playing cards decorated with lines from Richardson's works.

In 1742, "Pamela" became the first novel to be printed in America when Benjamin Franklin published it in Philadelphia. However, the novel did not sell well there.

Given the lax copyright laws at the time, many unofficial sequels were written and published without Richardson's consent, for example, Pamela's conduct in high life, published 1741 and sometimes attributed to John Kelly (1680?–1751). There were also several satires, the most famous being An Apology for the Life of Mrs. Shamela Andrews by Henry Fielding, published in 1741 under the pseudonym "Mr. Conny Keyber". Shamela portrays the protagonist as an amoral social climber who attempts to seduce "Squire Booby" while feigning innocence to manipulate him into marrying her. In that version, the author works to invalidate Pamela by pointing out the incongruities between characters and the overall plot of the story and suggests that she was not really as virtuous as she may have seemed to be. Another important satire was The Anti-Pamela; or, Feign'd Innocence Detected (1741) by Eliza Haywood. Although not technically a satire, the Marquis de Sade's Justine is generally perceived as a critical response to Pamela, due in part to its subtitle, "The Misfortunes of Virtue".

At least one modern critic has stated that the rash of satires can be viewed as a conservative reaction to a novel that called class, social and gender roles into question by asserting that domestic order can be determined by not only socio-economic status but also moral qualities of mind.

=== Richardson's revisions ===
The popularity of Richardson's novel led to much public debate over its message and style. Richardson was of the artisanal class, and among England's middle and upper classes, where the novel was popular, there was some displeasure over its at times plebeian style. Apparently, certain ladies of distinction took exception to the ways in which their fictional counterparts were represented. Richardson responded to some of these criticisms by revising the novel for each new edition. He also created a "reading group" of such women to advise him. Some of the most significant changes he made were alterations to Pamela's vocabulary. In the first edition, her diction is that of a labouring-class woman, but in later editions, Richardson made her more linguistically middle-class by removing the working-class idioms from her speech. In that way, he made her marriage to Mr. B less scandalous as she appeared to be more his equal in education.

The greatest change was to have her his equal too in birth by revising the story to reveal her parents as reduced gentlefolks. In the end, Richardson revised and released fourteen editions of Pamela, the last of which was published in 1801 after his death. Some believe that Pamela was a latent fetishization of Richardson's own fantasies and beliefs regarding women in society. Even though Richardson openly revised Pamela many times, the justification of male aggression in a "loving" domestic relationship, as evidenced between Pamela and Mr. B, remains controversial.

=== Original sources ===
A publication, Memoirs of Lady H, the Celebrated Pamela (1741), claims that the inspiration for Richardson's Pamela was the marriage of a coachman's daughter, Hannah Sturges, to the baronet, Sir Arthur Hesilrige, in 1725. Samuel Richardson claimed that the story was based on a true incident related to him by a friend about 25 years before, but did not identify the principals.

Prof Hubert McDermott has posited Vertue Rewarded, a 1693 Irish novel by an unknown author, as a possible influence. The two books have similar plots: "a beautiful and virtuous young woman of little or no social status falls in love with a prince or libertine who is equally besotted but whose wealth, rank and ambition make him desire only to seduce and debauch the chaste heroine, without having to marry her." Also, the title "virtue rewarded" is not found in any other work of the period.

=== Feminism in Pamela ===
Some believe that Richardson was one of the first male writers to take a feminist view while he wrote a novel. Pamela has been described as being a feminist piece of literature because it rejects traditional views of women and supports the new and changing role of women in society. One of the ways in which feminism is shown in the text is through allowing readers to see the depths of women (i.e. their emotions, feelings, thoughts) rather than seeing women at surface level. However, the poor treatment of Pamela herself and her intense consideration to her virtue, a societal construct founded in moral religion, might also suggest the opposite. Richardson himself was not a feminist, and Pamela consisted of the traditional lily-white heroine trope embellished with a sense of naivety (with Pamela being only fifteen years old). With respect to authorial intent, Pamela was driven only by her intense fear of having her virtue compromised, and her motivation to keep her virtue intact provided a very narrow scope of womanhood and the sex as a whole. The controversy over the novel is present and ongoing.

The epistolary form in which Pamela is written enables readers of the novel to see inside Pamela's mind, and, in doing so readers are able to better understand her identity and the ways her identity as a woman of lower socioeconomic status intersect and are bound up in that identity. Kacy Tillman compares the written "letter" to the body of the scribe (or "paper body") which writers and readers of letters struggle to control. Tillman writes, "...in early American novels, the letter served as a kind of paper body, a contested space where women writers and their readers vied for control over the female body, symbolizing the broader cultural struggle in which women were enmeshed during and shortly after the Revolution" (124), and in Tillman's article she posits that a relationship exists between "epistolarity and gender construction in early American novels: that women were expected to follow an epistolary code of ethics, which men could violate or manipulate as they saw fit: the control of a paper body was connected to the control of a physical one; and that women who failed (even despite trying to abide by the rules of epistolarity) risked ruin" (125). Within the first few chapters of Pamela, Virtue Rewarded, Pamela is concerned because one of her letters has been lost. Also, in an instance when Mr. B notices Pamela writing a letter, he asks to read it and, because he is her master, she allows him to do so. Of course, Mr. B does not find anything written in the letter that he does not like, but Mr. B's encroachment on Pamela's privacy mirrors his encroachment on the privacy of her body as he attempts to seduce her over and over again. Tillman argues that in early modern times, when letter-writing was an important and popular method of communication, "male letter readers could intercept and interpret those representations in a way that could void female agency" (125) and, because "letters... [are] an extension of the self" (Tillman 126), Pamela's privacy is at risk in myriad ways. At the end of Tillman's article, she addresses the relationship between the experience of letter-writing and the experience of sharing the letters once written are bound up in the writers' identities and social expectations: "Just as women must dress according to their station, so letters should adopt a tone and style that fits their situation. Just as women must protect their bodies from seduction, so missives must carefully regulate what they say to a suitor" (127). The letter is performative in that it forms "a paper body that had to be carefully crafted and regulated since every part of it--from the handwriting, to the paper, to the content--could be subject examination and judgment" (Tillman 126). In this way, the letter works to enact and sustain writers' identities and the relationships cultivated between writers and readers of the letters.

Pamela is strewn with contemporary themes that handle gender roles, male aggression, false imprisonment, classism, and the hierarchy of power evident through her forced stay at Mr. B's estate and seen through her kidnapping. Pamela had little-to-no choice in the arrangement and was a victim of Mr. B's sexual advances. Mr. B saw Pamela as an object of affection, and a pawn to his game.

== Editions ==
- The Cambridge Edition of the Works of Samuel Richardson (October 2011), Edited by Albert J. Rivero (based on the 1st edition of 1740 with list of emendations)
- Oxford World Classics (2001), Edited and annotated with an introduction by Thomas Keymer and Alice Wakely (based on the 1741 2nd edition)
- Penguin Classics (1985), Edited by Peter Sabor, Introduction by Margaret Doody (based on 1801 text with corrections from the 1810 edition)
- Riverside (1971), Edited by T. C. Duncan Eaves and Ben D. Kimpel (based on the 1st edition of 1740)

== Adaptations ==
=== Paintings ===
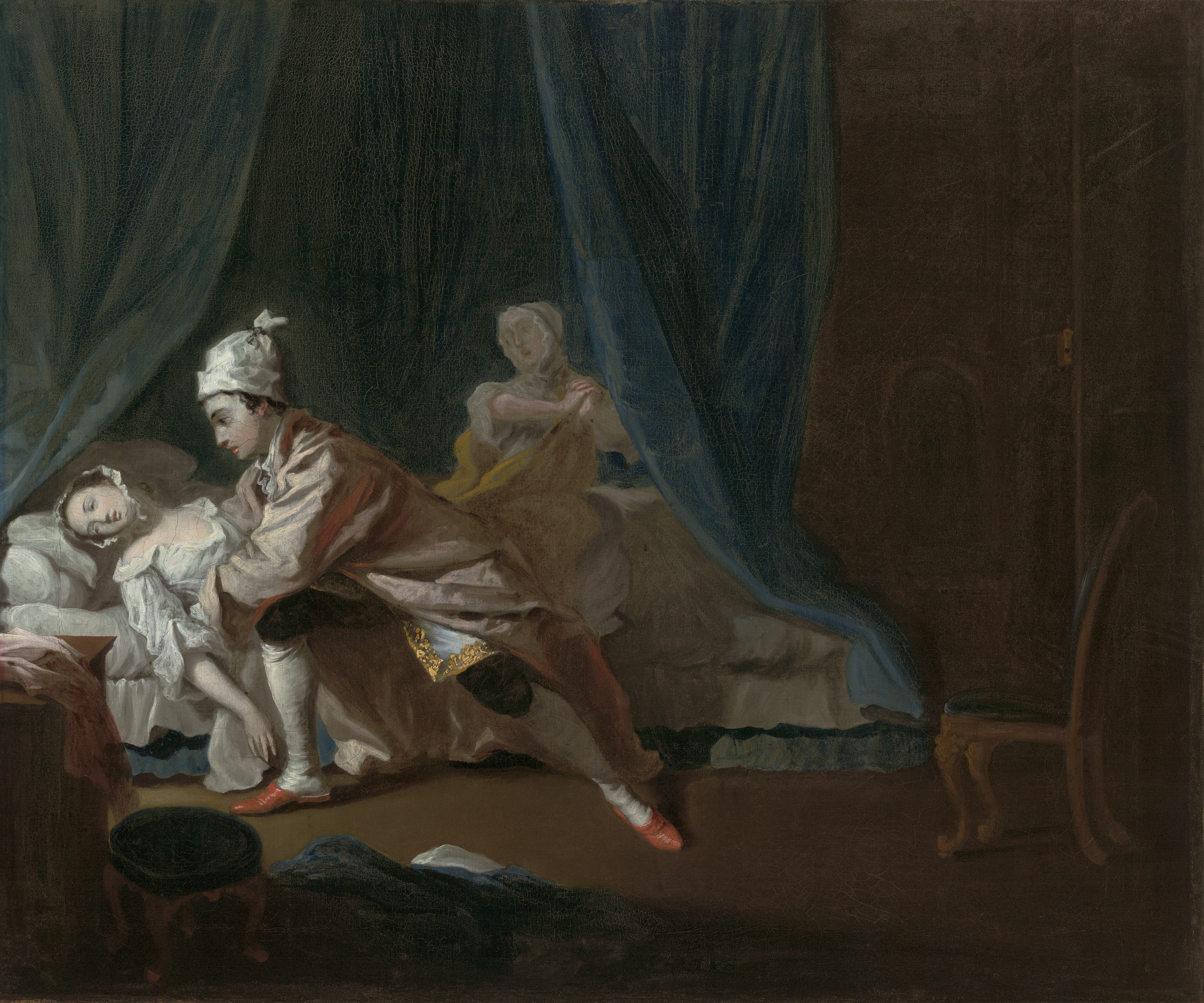
Pamela Fainting by Joseph Highmore (April 1743)

Around 1742 Francis Hayman also produced two paintings drawing on scenes and themes from the novel for supper boxes 12 and 16 at Vauxhall Gardens. The painting for Box 12 is now lost but showed the departure scene from Letter XXIX, whilst the one for Box 16 shows Pamela fleeing to Mr B.'s coach after revealing her marriage to Lady Davers and Mr B.'s servant Colbrand forcibly defending her from two of Lady Davers' servants. The latter was bought from the Gardens in 1841 by William Lowther, 1st Earl of Lonsdale, whose heirs sold it in 1947 to Henry Hornyold-Strickland, who in turn donated it to the National Trust as part of the house, collections and gardens of Sizergh Castle in 1950.

Soon afterwards, in 1743, Joseph Highmore produced a series of twelve paintings as the basis for a set of engravings. They are a free adaptation of the novel and focus mainly on the first book. They are now equally divided between Tate Britain, the National Gallery of Victoria and the Fitzwilliam Museum, each of which has four of the series.

=== Stage ===
Its success also led to several stage adaptations in England, France and Italy. In England, an adaptation by James Dance (under the pseudonym "James Love") premiered in 1742 , starring David Garrick as Jack Smatter, a fop original to Dance's play. In Italy, Richardson's novel was adapted by Chiari and Goldoni. In France, Boissy put on a Paméla ou la Vertu mieux éprouvée, a verse comedy in three acts (Comédiens italiens ordinaires du Roi, 4 March 1743), followed by Voltaire's verse comedy Nanine, ou le Prejuge vaincu (1749) and Neufchâteau's five-act verse comedy Paméla ou la Vertu récompensée (Comédiens Français, 1 August 1793). Appearing during the French Revolution, Neufchâteau's adaptation was felt to be too royalist in its sympathies by the Committee of Public Safety, which imprisoned its author and cast (including Anne Françoise Elisabeth Lange and Dazincourt) in the Madelonnettes and Sainte-Pélagie prisons. Mademoiselle Lange's straw hat from the play launched a trend for Pamela hats and bonnets which were worn well into the second half of the nineteenth century.

Pamela was also the basis for the libretto of Niccolò Piccinni's comic opera La buona figliuola.

The playwright Martin Crimp uses the text as a "provocation" for his stage play When We Have Sufficiently Tortured Each Other: 12 Variations on Samuel Richardson's Pamela, opening at the Royal National Theatre in 2019 starring Cate Blanchett and Stephen Dillane directed by Katie Mitchell.

=== Novels ===
The success of Pamela soon led to its translation into other languages, most notably into French by Abbé Prévost. It was also imitated by Robert-Martin Lesuire in his own novel la Paméla française, ou Lettres d’une jeune paysanne et d’un jeune ci-devant, contenant leurs aventures. More recently, Bay Area author Pamela Lu's first book Pamela: A Novel evokes Richardson's title and also borrows from Richardson the conceit of single-letter names to create a very different type of "quasi-bildungsroman," according to Publishers Weekly.

=== Film and television ===
- 1974 – UK film by Jim O'Connolly: Mistress Pamela with Ann Michelle as Pamela Andrews and Julian Barnes as Lord Robert Devenish (Mr. B).
- 2003 – Italian TV series by Cinzia TH Torrini: Elisa di Rivombrosa is loosely based on Pamela. The story takes place in the second half of the 18th century in Turin (Italy). The role of Pamela is that of Elisa Scalzi (played by Vittoria Puccini) in the series. The role of Mr. B is that of Count Fabrizio Ristori (played by Alessandro Preziosi).

== Allusions and references from other works ==
- Brontë, Charlotte (1847), Jane Eyre: Jane mentions Bessie's nursery stories and how some of them came from Pamela.
- Heyer, Georgette (1956), Sprig Muslin: Amanda, attempting to pass herself off as a lady's maid, uses Pamela as inspiration to invent a story that she was fired from her previous position because her employer had made improper advances towards her.
- Jackson, Shirley (1959), The Haunting of Hill House: The character of Doctor Montague mentions several times that he is reading Pamela.
- Amis, Kingsley (1960), Take a Girl Like You: Some have viewed this novel to be a modern retelling of Pamela; or, Virtue Rewarded as it shares many key elements with the novel, such as a young, beautiful woman being taken by an arrogant man. However, Amis claimed afterwards that he had little interest in classic fiction, which makes this proposition less likely.
- O'Brian, Patrick (1979), The Fortune of War: The character Captain York recommends the novel Pamela to his dinner guests.
- Gabaldon, Diana (1993), Voyager, the third novel in the Outlander series: In the chapter "The Torremolinos Gambit", the characters Jamie Fraser and Lord John Grey discuss Samuel Richardson's immense novel Pamela. Another mention is made in The Fiery Cross, Gabaldon's fifth novel in the series, wherein Roger Wakefield is perusing the Fraser library and comes across the "monstrous" "gigantic" novel with several bookmarks delineating where various readers gave up on the novel, either temporarily or permanently. This is likely a confusion of Pamela with Richardson's later novel Clarissa.
- Freedland, Jonathan (9 January 2007), The Long View (video), UK: BBC Radio 4. On 9 January 2007, BBC Radio 4 broadcast The Long View which contrasted Pamela's effect on 18th-century society with that of video games on 20th-century society.
- Baker, Jo (2013), Longbourn: Both volumes of Pamela have been read by Elizabeth Bennet and she passes the books to one of the maids. The maid contemplates the behavior of the characters and wonders what her own conduct would be if put in the same position.

== Bibliography ==
Editions

- Richardson, Samuel Pamela (Harmondsworth: Penguin, 2003) ISBN 978-0140431407. Edited by Margaret Ann Doody and Peter Sabor. This edition takes as its copy-text the revised, posthumously published edition of 1801.
- — (Oxford: Oxford University Press, 2008) ISBN 978-0199536498. Edited by Thomas Keymer and Alice Wakely. This edition takes as its copy-text the first edition of November 1740 (dated 1741).
- Richardson, Samuel Pamela Or Virtue Rewarded (Lector House, 2019) ISBN 935-3366712.

=== Criticism ===
- Armstrong, Nancy. Desire and Domestic Fiction: A Political History of the Novel. New York: Oxford University Press, 1987.
- Blanchard, Jane (2011). "Composing Purpose in Richardson's "Pamela"". South Atlantic Review. 76 (2): 93–107. JSTOR 43050924.
- Conboy, Sheila C. (1987). "Fabric and Fabrication in Richardson's Pamela". ELH. 54 (1): 81–96. doi:10.2307/2873051. JSTOR 2873051.
- Doody, Margaret Anne. A Natural Passion: A Study of the Novels of Samuel Richardson. Oxford: Clarendon Press, 1974.
- Dussinger, John A. (1999). "'Ciceronian Eloquence': The Politics of Virtue in Richardson's Pamela". Eighteenth-Century Fiction. 12 (1): 39–60. doi:10.1353/ecf.1999.0019. S2CID 154953411.
- Flynn, Carol Houlihan (1982). "Horrid Romancing: Richardson's Use of the Fairy Tale". Samuel Richardson: A Man of Letters. Princeton University Press. pp. 145–195. ISBN 978-1-4008-5404-2. JSTOR j.ctt7zvgnr.8.
- Gwilliam, Tassie (1991). "Pamela and the Duplicitous Body of Femininity". Representations (34): 104–133. doi:10.2307/2928772. JSTOR 2928772.
- Keymer, Thomas; Sabor, Peter (2005). 'Pamela' in the Marketplace: Literary Controversy and Print Culture in Eighteenth-Century Britain and Ireland. Cambridge University Press. ISBN 978-0-521-81337-2.
- Levin, Gerald (1971). "Richardson's 'Pamela': 'Conflicting Trends'". American Imago. 28 (4): 319–329. JSTOR 26302663. PMID 4947999.
- McKeon, Michael. The Origins of the English Novel: 1600–1740. Baltimore: Johns Hopkins University Press, 2002.
- Rivero, Albert J. (2001). "The Place of Sally Godfrey in Richardson's Pamela". In Blewett, David (ed.). Passion and Virtue: Essays on the Novels of Samuel Richardson. University of Toronto Press. pp. 52–72. doi:10.3138/9781442678293. ISBN 978-0-8020-3503-5. JSTOR 10.3138/9781442678293.9.
- Rogers, Katharine M. (1976). "Sensitive Feminism vs. Conventional Sympathy: Richardson and Fielding on Women". Novel: A Forum on Fiction. 9 (3): 256–270. doi:10.2307/1345466. JSTOR 1345466.
- Townsend, Alex, Autonomous Voices: An Exploration of Polyphony in the Novels of Samuel Richardson, 2003, Oxford, Bern, Berlin, Bruxelles, Frankfurt/M., New York, Wien, 2003, ISBN 978-3-906769-80-6, 978-0-8204-5917-2
- Vallone, Lynne (1995). "'The Matter of Letters': Conduct, Anatomy, and Pamela". Disciplines of Virtue: Girls' Culture in the Eighteenth and Nineteenth Centuries. Yale University Press. pp. 26–44. doi:10.2307/j.ctt211qw91.6. ISBN 978-0-300-06172-7. JSTOR j.ctt211qw91.6.
- Watt, Ian. The Rise of the Novel: Studies in Defoe, Richardson and Fielding. Berkeley: University of California Press, 1957.
