= Samuel Richardson =

English writer and printer (1689–1761)

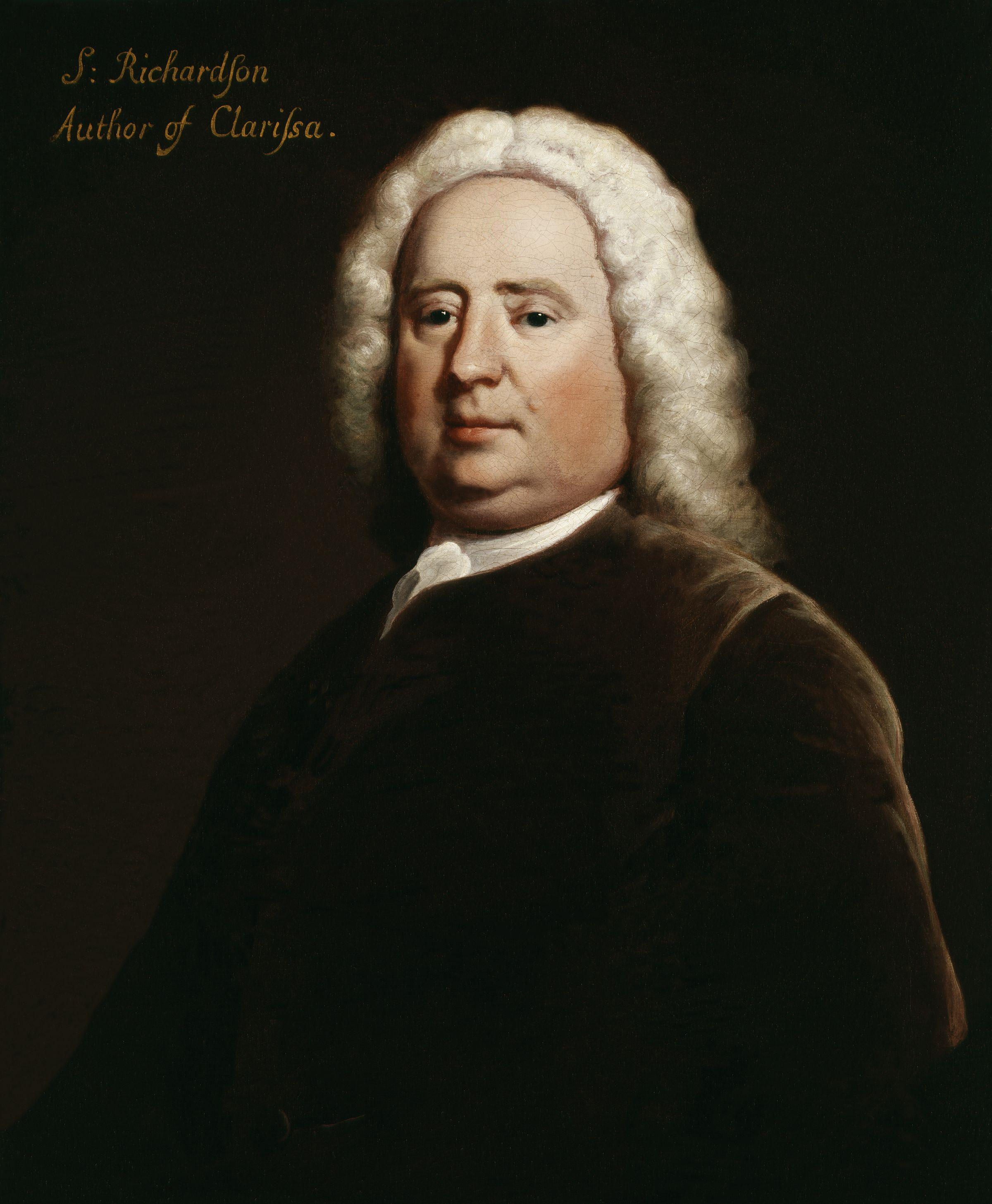
- Portrait by Joseph Highmore, 1750
- Born: 19 August 1689 (baptised); Mackworth, Derbyshire, England
- Died: 4 July 1761 (aged 71); Parsons Green, now in London, England, Kingdom of Great Britain
- Occupations: Writer, printer and publisher
- Spouse(s): Martha Wilde (m. 1721–1731) Elizabeth Leake (m. 1733)
- Writing career
- Language: English

Samuel Richardson (baptised 19 August 1689 – 4 July 1761) was an English writer and printer known for three epistolary novels: Pamela; or, Virtue Rewarded (1740), Clarissa; or, The History of a Young Lady (1748) and The History of Sir Charles Grandison (1753). He printed almost 500 works, including journals and magazines, working periodically with the London bookseller Andrew Millar.

Richardson had been apprenticed to the printer John Wilde, whose daughter Martha he eventually married. All six of their children died in infancy or childbirth, with Martha herself dying in childbirth in 1731. In 1733, he married Elizabeth Leake, daughter of printer John Leake. Together they had six more children, of whom four daughters reached adulthood.

Richardson penned his first novel, Pamela, at the age of 51 and was an instant success. Leading acquaintances included Samuel Johnson and Sarah Fielding, the physician and Behmenist George Cheyne, and the theologian and writer William Law, whose books he printed. At Law's request, Richardson printed some poems by John Byrom. In literature, he rivalled Henry Fielding; the two responded to each other's literary styles.

== Biography ==
Richardson, one of nine children, was probably born in 1689 in Mackworth, Derbyshire, to Samuel and Elizabeth Richardson. It is unsure where in Derbyshire he was born because Richardson always concealed the location, but it has recently been discovered that Richardson probably lived in poverty as a child. The older Richardson was, according to the younger:

a very honest man, descended of a family of middling note, in the country of Surrey, but which having for several generations a large number of children, the not large possessions were split and divided, so that he and his brothers were put to trades; and the sisters were married to tradesmen.

His mother, according to Richardson, "was also a good woman, of a family not ungenteel; but whose father and mother died in her infancy, within half-an-hour of each other, in the London pestilence of 1665".

The trade his father pursued was that of a joiner (a type of carpenter, but Richardson explains that it was "then more distinct from that of a carpenter than now it is with us"). In describing his father's occupation, Richardson stated that "he was a good draughtsman and understood architecture", and it was suggested by Samuel Richardson's son-in-law that the senior Richardson was a cabinetmaker and an exporter of mahogany while working at Aldersgate-street. The abilities and position of his father brought him to the attention of James Scott, 1st Duke of Monmouth. However, as Richardson claims, this was to Richardson senior's "great detriment" because of the failure of the Monmouth Rebellion, which ended in the death of Scott in 1685. After Scott's death, the elder Richardson was forced to abandon his business in London and live a modest life in Derbyshire.

=== Early life ===
The Richardsons were not exiled forever from London; they eventually returned, and young Richardson was educated at Christ's Hospital grammar school. The extent that he was educated at the school is uncertain, and Leigh Hunt wrote years later:

It is a fact not generally known that Richardson... received what education he had (which was very little, and did not go beyond English) at Christ's Hospital. It may be wondered how he could come no better taught from a school which had sent forth so many good scholars; but in his time, and indeed till very lately, that foundation was divided into several schools, none of which partook of the lessons of the others; and Richardson, agreeably to his father's intention of bringing him up to trade, was most probably confined to the writing school, where all that was taught was writing and arithmetic.

However, this conflicts with Richardson's nephew's account that "'it is certain that [Richardson] was never sent to a more respectable seminary' than 'a private grammar school' located in Derbyshire".

I recollect that I was early noted for having invention. I was not fond of play, as other boys; my school-fellows used to call me Serious and Gravity; and five of them particularly delighted to single me out, either for a walk, or at their father's houses, or at mine, to tell them stories, as they phrased it. Some I told them, from my reading, as true; others from my head, as mere invention; of which they would be most fond, and often were affected by them. One of them particularly, I remember, was for putting me to write a history, as he called it, on the model of Tommy Pots; I now forget what it was, only that it was of a servant-man preferred by a fine young lady (for his goodness) to a lord, who was a libertine. All of my stories carried with them, I am bold to say, a useful moral.

— Samuel Richardson on his storytelling.

Little is known of Richardson's early years beyond the few things that Richardson was willing to share. Although he was not forthcoming with specific events and incidents, he did talk about the origins of his writing ability; Richardson would tell stories to his friends and spent his youth constantly writing letters. One such letter, written when Richardson was almost 11, was directed to a woman in her 50s who was in the habit of constantly criticizing others. "Assuming the style and address of a person in years", Richardson cautioned her about her actions. However, his handwriting was used to determine that it was his work, and the woman complained to his mother. The result was, as he explains, that "my mother chid me for the freedom taken by such a boy with a woman of her years" but also "commended my principles, though she censured the liberty taken".

After his writing ability was known, he began to help others in the community write letters. In particular, Richardson, at the age of 13, helped many of the young women with whom he associated to write responses to various love letters they received. As Richardson claims, "I have been directed to chide, and even repulse, when an offence was either taken or given, at the very time that the heart of the chider or repulser was open before me, overflowing with esteem and affect". Although this helped his writing ability, he in 1753 advised the Dutch minister Stinstra not to draw large conclusions from these early actions:

You think, Sir, you can account from my early secretaryship to young women in my father's neighbourhood, for the characters I have drawn of the heroines of my three works. But this opportunity did little more for me, at so tender an age, than point, as I may say, or lead my enquiries, as I grew up, into the knowledge of female heart.

He continued to explain that he did not fully understand females until writing Clarissa; or, The History of a Young Lady, and these letters were only a beginning.

=== Early career ===
The elder Richardson originally wanted his son to become a clergyman, but he was not able to afford the education that the younger Richardson would require, so he let his son pick his own profession. He selected the profession of printing because he hoped to "gratify a thirst for reading, which, in after years, he disclaimed". At the age of 17, in 1706, Richardson was bound in seven-year apprenticeship under John Wilde as a printer. Wilde's printing shop was in Golden Lion Court on Aldersgate Street, and Wilde had a reputation as "a master who grudged every hour... that tended not to his profit".

I served a diligent seven years to it; to a master who grudged every hour to me that tended not to his profit, even of those times of leisure and diversion, which the refractoriness of my fellow-servants obliged him to allow them, and were usually allowed by other masters to their apprentices. I stole from the hours of rest and relaxation, my reading times for improvement of my mind; and, being engaged in correspondence with a gentleman, greatly my superior in degree, and of ample fortune, who, had he lived, intended high things for me; these were all the opportunities I had in my apprenticeship to carry it on. But this little incident I may mention; I took care that even my candle was of my own purchasing, that I might not, in the most trifling instance, make my master a sufferer (and who used to call me the pillar of his house) and not to disable myself by watching or sitting-up, to perform my duty to him in the day time.

— Samuel Richardson on his time with John Wilde.

While working for Wilde, he met a rich gentleman who took an interest in Richardson's writing abilities and the two began to correspond with each other. When the gentleman died a few years later, Richardson lost a potential patron, which delayed his ability to pursue his own writing career. He decided to devote himself completely to his apprenticeship, and he worked his way up to a position as a compositor and a corrector of the shop's printing press. In 1713, Richardson left Wilde to become "Overseer and Corrector of a Printing-Office". This meant that Richardson ran his own shop, but the location of that shop is unknown. It is possible that the shop was located in Staining Lane or may have been jointly run with John Leake in Jewin Street.

In 1719, Richardson took the freedom of the City of London, and set up his own printing shop near the Salisbury Court district close to Fleet Street. Although he claimed to business associates that he was working out of the well-known Salisbury Court, his printing shop was more accurately located on the corner of Blue Ball Court and Dorset Street in a house that later became Bell's Building. On 23 November 1721, Richardson married Martha Wilde, the daughter of his former employer and master John Wilde. The match was "prompted mainly by prudential considerations", although Richardson would claim later that there was a strong love-affair between them. He soon brought her to live with him in the printing shop that served also as his home.

A key moment in Richardson's career came on 6 August 1722 when he took on his first apprentices: Thomas Gover, George Mitchell, and Joseph Chrichley. He would later take on William Price (2 May 1727), Samuel Jolley (5 September 1727), Bethell Wellington (2 September 1729), and Halhed Garland (5 May 1730).

One of Richardson's first major printing contracts came in June 1723, when he began to print the bi-weekly The True Briton for Philip Wharton, 1st Duke of Wharton. This was a Jacobite political paper which attacked the government and was soon censored for printing "common libels". However, Richardson's name was not on the publication, and he was able to escape any of the negative fallout, although it is possible that Richardson participated in the papers as far as actually writing one himself. The only lasting effect from the paper would be the incorporation of Wharton's libertine characteristics in the character of Lovelace in Richardson's Clarissa, although Wharton would be only one of many models of libertine behaviour that Richardson would find in his life. In 1724, Richardson befriended Thomas Gent, Henry Woodfall, and Arthur Onslow, the latter of those would become the Speaker of the House of Commons.

Richardson anonymously published pamphlets as described in Samuel Richardson as Anonymous Editor and Printer : Recycling Texts for the Book Market

Over their ten years of marriage, Martha and Samuel Richardson had five sons and one daughter – three of the boys were successively named Samuel after their father, but all three died as infants. Martha died in childbirth on 23 January 1731, and their youngest son, Samuel, succumbed to illness in 1732. In 1733, Richardson married Elizabeth Leake, the daughter of printer John Leake. Samuel and Elizabeth had six children (five daughters and one son). Four of their daughters, Mary, Martha, Anne, and Sarah, reached adulthood. Their son, another Samuel, was born in 1739 but died in 1740.

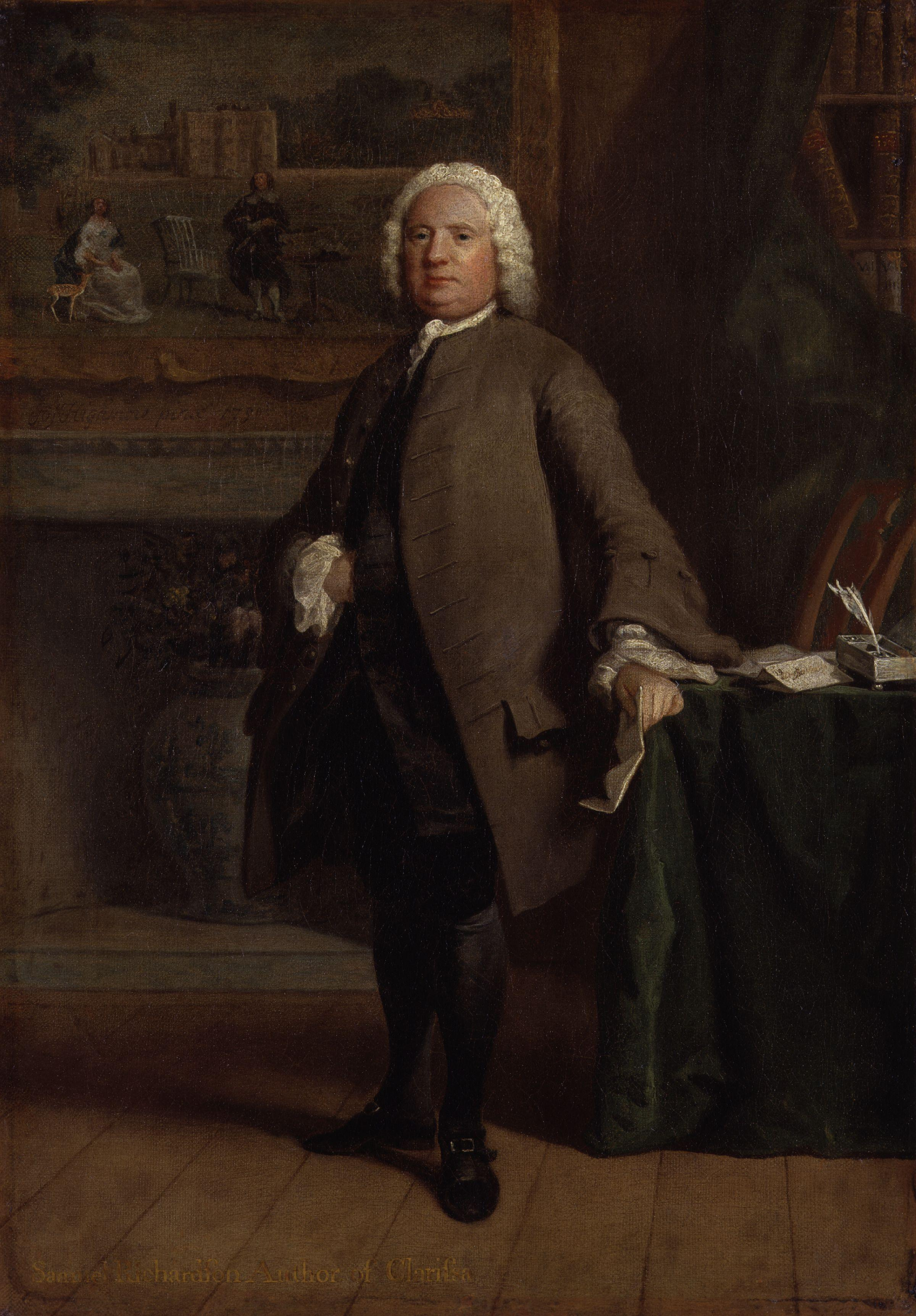
Portrait of Samuel Richardson by Joseph Highmore. National Portrait Gallery, Westminster, England.

In 1733, Richardson was granted a contract with the House of Commons, with help from Onslow, to print the Journals of the House. The 26 volumes of the work soon improved his business. Later in 1733, he wrote The Apprentice's Vade Mecum, urging young men like himself to be diligent and self-denying. The work was intended to "create the perfect apprentice". Written in response to the "epidemick Evils of the present Age", the text is best known for its condemnation of popular forms of entertainment including theatres, taverns and gambling. The manual targets the apprentice as the focal point for the moral improvement of society, not because he is most susceptible to vice, but because, Richardson suggests, he is more responsive to moral improvement than his social betters. During this time, Richardson took on five more apprentices: Thomas Verren (1 August 1732), Richard Smith (6 February 1733), Matthew Stimson (7 August 1733), Bethell Wellington (7 May 1734), and Daniel Green (1 October 1734). His total staff during the 1730s numbered seven, as his first three apprentices were free by 1728, and two of his apprentices, Verren and Smith, died soon into their apprenticeship. The loss of Verren was particularly devastating to Richardson because Verren was his nephew and his hope for a male heir that would take over the press.

=== First novel ===
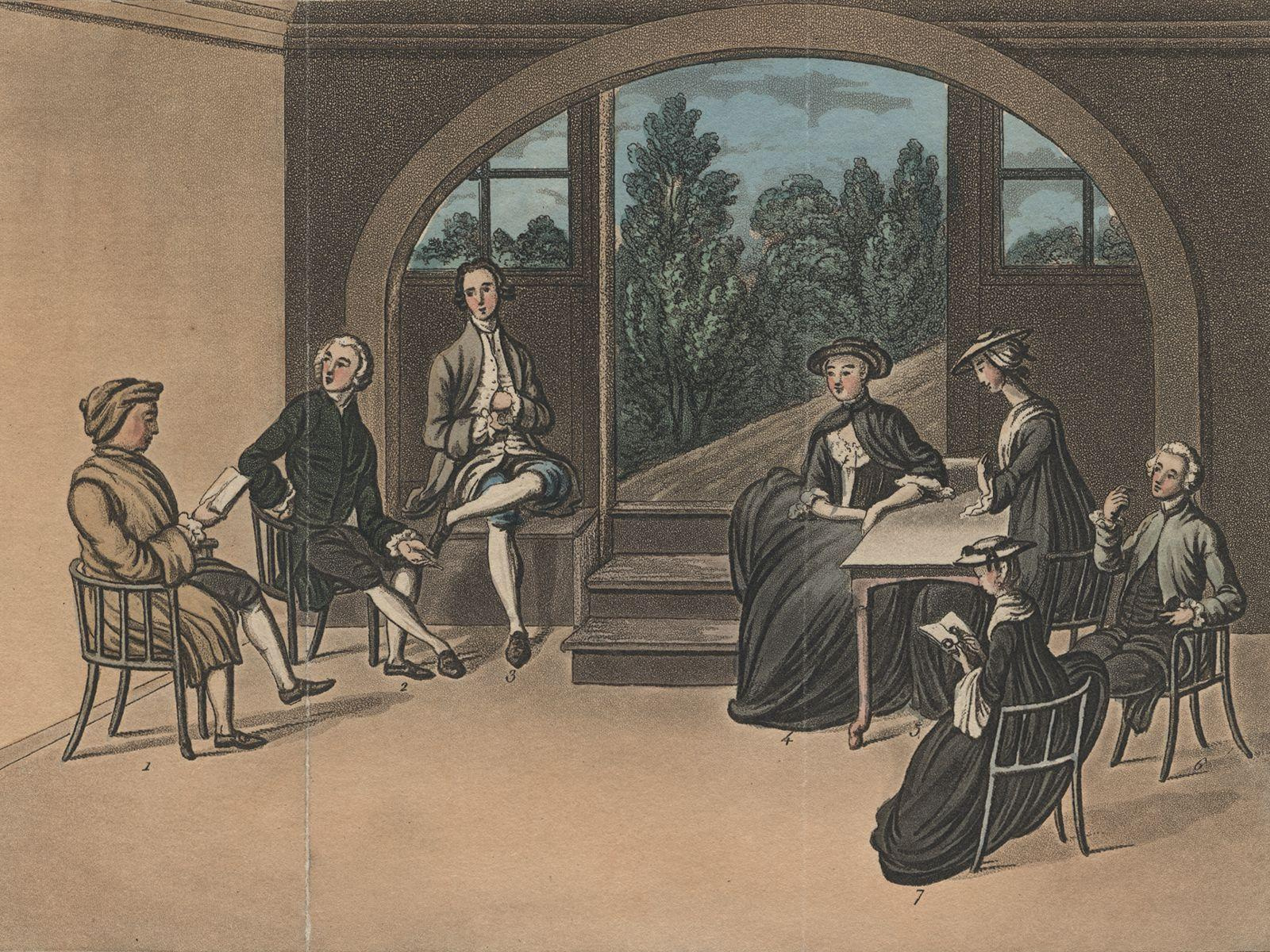
Samuel Richardson reading aloud the manuscript of Sir Charles Grandison to a group of friends in 1751. Coloured Engraving by Miss Highmore. National Portrait Gallery, Westminster, England.

Work continued to improve, and Richardson printed the Daily Journal between 1736 and 1737, and the Daily Gazetteer in 1738. During his time printing the Daily Journal, he was also printer to the "Society for the Encouragement of Learning", a group that tried to help authors become independent from publishers, but collapsed soon after. In December 1738, Richardson's printing business was successful enough to allow him to lease a house in Fulham in London. This house, which would be Richardson's residence from 1739 to 1754, was later named "The Grange" in 1836. In 1739, Richardson was asked by his friends Charles Rivington and John Osborn to write "a little volume of Letters, in a common style, on such subjects as might be of use to those country readers, who were unable to indite for themselves". While writing this volume, Richardson was inspired to write his first novel.

Richardson made the transition from master printer to novelist on 6 November 1740 with the publication of Pamela: or, Virtue Rewarded. Pamela was sometimes regarded as "the first novel in English" or the first modern novel. Richardson explained the origins of the work:

In the progress of [Rivington's and Osborn's collection], writing two or three letters to instruct handsome girls, who were obliged to go out to service, as we phrase it, how to avoid the snares that might be laid against their virtue, and hence sprung Pamela... Little did I think, at first, of making one, much less two volumes of it... I thought the story, if written in an easy and natural manner, suitably to the simplicity of it, might possibly introduce a new species of writing, that might possibly turn young people into a course of reading different from the pomp and parade of romance-writing, and dismissing the improbable and marvellous, with which novels generally abound, might tend to promote the cause of religion and virtue.

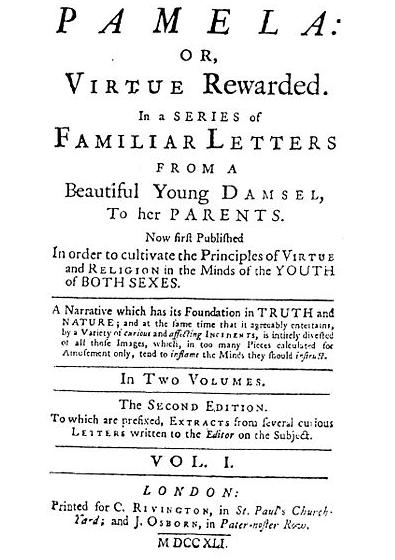
Title page of Pamela

After Richardson started the work on 10 November 1739, his wife and her friends became so interested in the story that he finished it on 10 January 1740. Pamela Andrews, the heroine of Pamela, represented "Richardson's insistence upon well-defined feminine roles" and was part of a common fear held during the 18th century that women were "too bold". In particular, her "zeal for housewifery" was included as a proper role of women in society. Although Pamela and the title heroine were popular and gave a proper model for how women should act, they inspired "a storm of anti-Pamelas" (like Henry Fielding's Shamela and Joseph Andrews and Eliza Haywood's The Anti-Pamela) because the character "perfectly played her part".

Later that year, Richardson printed Rivington and Osborn's book which inspired Pamela under the title of Letters written to and for particular Friends, on the most important Occasions. Directing not only the requisite Style and Forms to be observed in writing Familiar Letters; but how to think and act justly and prudently, in the common Concerns of Human Life. The book contained many anecdotes and lessons on how to live, but Richardson did not care for the work and it was never expanded even though it went into six editions during his life. He went so far as to tell a friend, "This volume of letters is not worthy of your perusal" because they were "intended for the lower classes of people".

Multiple sequels to Pamela were written by other writers, such as Pamela's Conduct in High Life, which was written by John Kelly and published by Ward and Chandler in September 1741. Published that same year were two anonymous sequels: Pamela in High Life and The Life of Pamela, the latter being a third-person retelling of both Richardson's original novel and Kelly's continuation. These unofficial sequels capitalised off the character's popularity and readers desire to learn what happened to Pamela and Mr. B after the conclusion of Richardson's novel. This compelled Richardson to write a sequel to the novel, Pamela in her Exalted Condition, in December 1741. The novel had a poorer reception than the first, as Peter Sabor writes, "the continuation is a far blander affair than the original work," focusing on Pamela's gentility and married life. The public's interest in the characters was waning, and this was only furthered by Richardson's focusing on Pamela discussing morality, literature, and philosophy.

=== Later career ===
After the failures of the Pamela sequels, Richardson began to compose a new novel. It was not until early 1744 that the content of the plot was known, and this happened when he sent Aaron Hill two chapters to read. In particular, Richardson asked Hill if he could help shorten the chapters because Richardson was worried about the length of the novel. Hill refused, saying,

You have formed a style, as much your property as our respect for what you write is, where verbosity becomes a virtue; because, in pictures which you draw with such a skilful negligence, redundance but conveys resemblance; and to contract the strokes, would be to spoil the likeness.

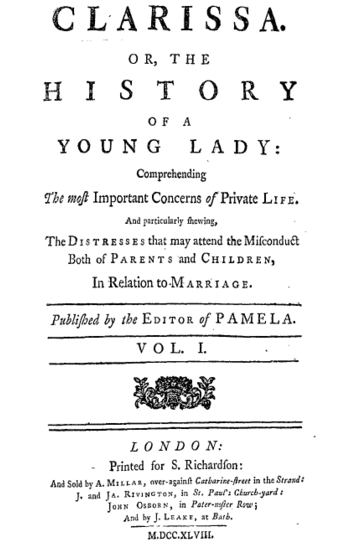
Title page of Clarissa

In July, Richardson sent Hill a complete "design" of the story, and asked Hill to try again, but Hill responded, "It is impossible, after the wonders you have shown in Pamela, to question your infallible success in this new, natural, attempt" and that "you must give me leave to be astonished, when you tell me that you have finished it already". However, the novel was not complete to Richardson's satisfaction until October 1746. Between 1744 and 1746, Richardson tried to find readers who could help him shorten the work, but his readers wanted to keep the work in its entirety. A frustrated Richardson wrote to Edward Young in November 1747:

What contentions, what disputes have I involved myself in with my poor Clarissa through my own diffidence, and for want of a will! I wish I had never consulted anybody but Dr. Young, who so kindly vouchsafed me his ear, and sometimes his opinion.

Richardson did not devote all of his time just to working on his new novel, but was busy printing various works for other authors that he knew. In 1742, he printed the third edition of Daniel Defoe's Tour through Great Britain. He filled his few further years with smaller works for his friends until 1748, when Richardson started helping Sarah Fielding and her friend Jane Collier to write novels. By 1748, Richardson was so impressed with Collier that he accepted her as the governess to his daughters. In 1753, she wrote An Essay on the Art of Ingeniously Tormenting with the help of Sarah Fielding and possibly James Harris or Richardson, and it was Richardson who printed the work. But Collier was not the only author to be helped by Richardson, as he printed an edition of Young's Night Thoughts in 1749.

By 1748 his novel Clarissa; or, The History of a Young Lady was published in full: two volumes appeared in November 1747, two in April 1748, and three in December 1748. Unlike the novel, the author was not faring well at this time. By August 1748, Richardson was in poor health. He had a sparse diet that consisted mostly of vegetables and drinking vast amounts of water, and was not robust enough to prevent the effects of being bled upon the advice of various doctors throughout his life. He was known for "vague 'startings' and 'paroxysms'", along with experiencing tremors. Richardson once wrote to a friend that "my nervous disorders will permit me to write with more impunity than to read" and that writing allowed him a "freedom he could find nowhere else".

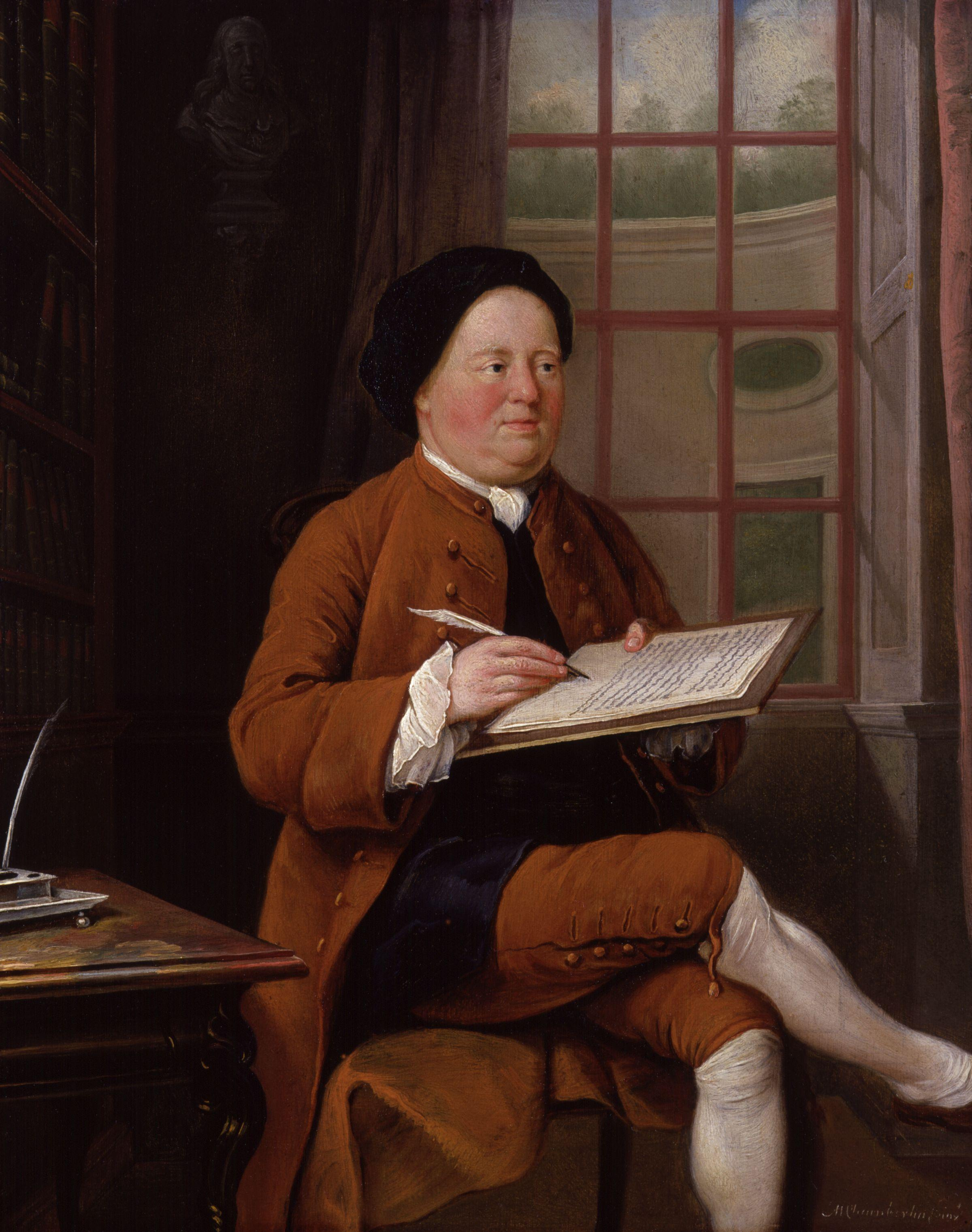
Portrait of Richardson from the 1750s by Mason Chamberlin

However, his condition did not stop him from continuing to release the final volumes of Clarissa after November 1748. To Hill he wrote: "The Whole will make Seven; that is, one more to attend these two. Eight crouded into Seven, by a smaller Type. Ashamed as I am of the Prolixity, I thought I owed the Public Eight Vols. in Quantity for the Price of Seven". Richardson later made it up to the public with "deferred Restorations" of the fourth edition of the novel being printed in larger print with eight volumes and a preface that reads: "It is proper to observe with regard to the present Edition that it has been thought fit to restore many Passages, and several Letters which were omitted in the former merely for shortening-sake."

The response to the novel was positive, and the public began to describe the title heroine as "divine Clarissa". It was soon considered Richardson's "masterpiece", his greatest work, and was rapidly translated into French in part or in full, for instance by the abbé Antoine François Prévost, as well as into German. The Dutch translator of Clarissa was the distinguished Mennonite preacher, Johannes Stinstra (1708–1790), who as a champion of Socinianism had been suspended from the ministry in 1742. This gave him sufficient leisure to translate Clarissa, which was published in eight volumes between 1752–1755. However, Stinstra later wrote in a letter to Richardson of 24 December 1753 that the translation had been "a burden too heavy for [his] shoulders". In England there was particular emphasis on Richardson's "natural creativity" and his ability to incorporate daily life experience into the novel. However, the final three volumes were delayed, and many of the readers began to "anticipate" the concluding story and some demanded that Richardson write a happy ending. One such advocate of the happy ending was Henry Fielding, who had previously written Joseph Andrews to mock Richardson's Pamela. Although Fielding was originally opposed to Richardson, Fielding supported the original volumes of Clarissa and thought a happy ending would be "poetical justice". Those who disagreed included the Sussex diarist Thomas Turner, writing in about July 1754: "Clarissa Harlow [sic], I look upon as a very well-wrote thing, tho' it must be allowed it is too prolix. The author keeps up the character of every person in all places; and as to the maner [sic] of its ending, I like it better than if it had terminated in more happy consequences."

Others wanted Lovelace to be reformed and for him and Clarissa to marry, but Richardson would not allow a "reformed rake" to be her husband, and was unwilling to change the ending. In a postscript to Clarissa, Richardson wrote:

if the temporary sufferings of the Virtuous and the Good can be accounted for and justified on Pagan principles, many more and infinitely stronger reasons will occur to a Christian Reader in behalf of what are called unhappy Catastrophes, from a consideration of the doctrine of future rewards; which is every where strongly enforced in the History of Clarissa.

Although few were bothered by the epistolary style, Richardson feels obliged to continue his postscript with a defence of the form based on the success of it in Pamela.

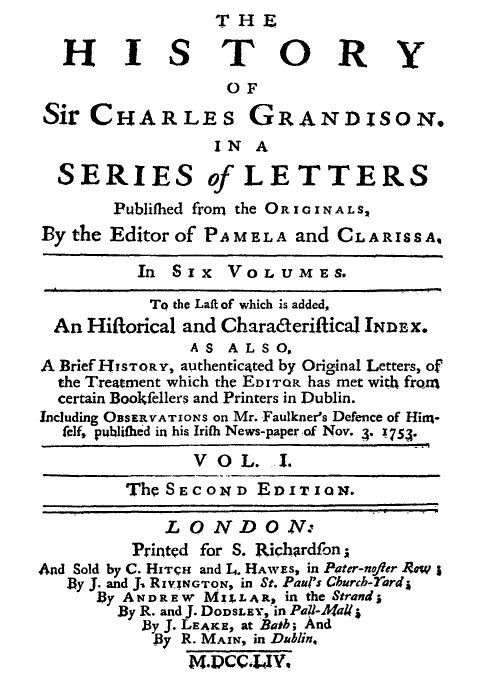
Title page of Grandison

However, some did question the propriety of having Lovelace, the villain of the novel, act in such an immoral fashion. The novel avoids glorifying Lovelace, as Carol Flynn puts it,

by damning his character with monitory footnotes and authorial intrusions, Richardson was free to develop in his fiction his villain's fantasy world. Schemes of mass rape would be legitimate as long as Richardson emphasized the negative aspects of his character at the same time.

But Richardson still felt the need to respond by writing a pamphlet called Answer to the Letter of a Very Reverend and Worthy Gentleman. In the pamphlet, he defends his characterisations and explains that he took great pains to avoid any glorification of scandalous behaviour, unlike the authors of many other novels that rely on characters of such low quality.

In 1749, Richardson's female friends started asking him to create a male figure as virtuous as his heroines "Pamela" and "Clarissa" in order to "give the world his idea of a good man and fine gentleman combined". Although he did not at first agree, he eventually complied, starting work on a book in this vein in June 1750. Near the end of 1751, Richardson sent a draft of the novel The History of Sir Charles Grandison to Mrs. Donnellan, and the novel was being finalised in the middle of 1752. When the novel was being printed in 1753, Richardson discovered that Irish printers were trying to pirate the work. He immediately fired those he suspected of giving the printers advanced copies of Grandison and relied on multiple London printing firms to help him produce an authentic edition before the pirated version was sold. The first four volumes were published on 13 November 1753, and in December the next two would follow. The remaining volume was published in March to complete a seven-volume series while a six-volume set was simultaneously published, and these met with success. In Grandison, Richardson was unwilling to risk having a negative response to any "rakish" characteristics that Lovelace embodied, and denigrated the immoral characters "to show those mischievous young admirers of Lovelace once and for all that the rake should be avoided".

=== Death ===
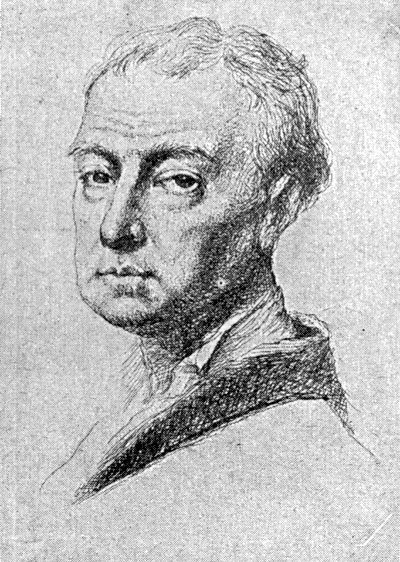
Bust of Richardson

In his final years, Richardson received visits from the Archbishop of Canterbury, Thomas Secker, other important political figures, and many London writers. By that time, he enjoyed a high social position and was Master of the Stationers' Company. In early November 1754, Richardson and his family moved from the Grange to a home at Parsons Green, now in west London. During this time Richardson received a letter from Samuel Johnson asking for money to pay a debt that Johnson was unable to afford. On 16 March 1756, Richardson responded with more than enough money and their friendship was certain by this time.

At the same time as he was associating with important figures of the day, Richardson's career as a novelist drew to a close. Grandison was his final novel, and he stopped writing fiction afterwards. It was Grandison that set the tone for Richardson's followers after his death. However, he was continually prompted by various friends and admirers to continue to write along with suggested topics. Richardson did not like any of the topics, and chose to spend all of his time composing letters to his friends and associates. The only major work that Richardson would write would be A Collection of the Moral and Instruction Sentiments, Maxims, Cautions, and Reflexions, contained in the Histories of Pamela, Clarissa, and Sir Charles Grandison. Although it is possible that this work was inspired by Johnson asking for an "index rerum" for Richardson's novels, the Collection contains more of a focus on "moral and instructive" lessons than the index that Johnson sought.

After June 1758, Richardson began to suffer from insomnia, and in June 1761, he was afflicted with apoplexy. This moment was described by his friend, Miss Talbot, on 2 July 1761:

Poor Mr. Richardson was seized on Sunday evening with a most severe paralytic stroke.... It sits pleasantly upon my mind, that the last morning we spent together was particularly friendly, and quiet, and comfortable. It was 28 May – he looked then so well! One has long apprehended some stroke of this kind; the disease made its gradual approaches by that heaviness which clouded the cheerfulness of his conversation, that used to be so lively and so instructive; by the increased tremblings which unfitted that hand so peculiarly formed to guide the pen; and by, perhaps, the querulousness of temper, most certainly not natural to so sweet and so enlarged a mind, which you and I have lately lamented, as making his family at times not so comfortable as his principles, his study, and his delight to diffuse happiness, wherever he could, would otherwise have done

Two days later, aged 71, on 4 July 1761, Richardson died at Parsons Green and was buried at St. Bride's Church in Fleet Street near his first wife Martha.

During Richardson's life, his printing press produced about 10,000 pieces, including novels, historical texts, Acts of Parliament, and newspapers, making his print house one of the most productive and diverse in the 18th century. He wanted to keep the press in his family, but after the death of his four sons and a nephew, his printing press would be left in his will to his only surviving male heir, a second nephew. This happened to be a nephew whom Richardson did not trust, doubting his abilities as a printer. Richardson's fears proved well-founded, for after his death the press stopped producing quality works and eventually stopped printing altogether. Richardson owned copyrights to most of his works, and these were sold after his death, in twenty-fourth share issues, with shares in Clarissa bringing in 25 pounds each and those for Grandison bringing in 20 pounds each. Shares in Pamela, sold in sixteenths, went for 18 pounds each.

The first full biography of Richardson was written by Clara Linklater Thomson and published in 1900, and is credited with bringing "Richardson back into view as a major novelist at a time when he was no longer being read".

== Epistolary novels ==
Richardson was a skilled letter writer and his talent traces back to his childhood. Throughout his whole life, he would constantly write to his various associates. Richardson had a "faith" in the act of letter writing, and believed that letters could be used to accurately portray character traits. He quickly adopted the epistolary novel form, which granted him "the tools, the space, and the freedom to develop distinctly different characters speaking directly to the reader". The epistolary form gave Richardson, as well as others, the means to impact his audience more effectively as readers were able to get a more intimate insight into a novel's characters. This allowed a stronger sense of engagement with the text to develop. Richardson structured his epistolary work to offer multiple perspectives so readers could interpret the text in varied ways. However, Richardson "hoped he would eventually convince his audience to read in the ways that he chose—ways that he hoped would lead to moral regeneration." These epistolary novels were a "moral project" as well as a literary one; Susan Whyman writes that Richardson's "goal was not only to reform reading practices but to reform lives as well."

In his first novel, Pamela, he explored the various complexities of the title character's life, and the letters allow the reader to witness her develop and progress over time. The novel was an experiment, but it allowed Richardson to create a complex heroine through a series of her letters. When Richardson wrote Clarissa, he had more experience in the form and expanded the letter writing to two main correspondents and a diverse cast of supporting and minor correspondents, which created a complex system of characters growing and changing over time. One of the two main letter-writers, Lovelace, is the villain of the story, writing primarily to a rakish friend of his efforts to seduce the virtuous Clarissa. The other is Clarissa herself, writing primarily to her best friend Anna Howe of her efforts to avoid being married off or seduced. Leo Braudy described the benefits of the epistolary form of Clarissa as, "Language can work: letters can be ways to communicate and justify". By the time Richardson writes Grandison, he transforms the letter writing from telling of personal insights and explaining feelings into a means for people to communicate their thoughts on the actions of others and for the public to celebrate virtue. The letters are no longer written for a few people, but are passed along in order for all to see. The characters of Pamela, Clarissa, and Grandison are revealed in a personal way, with the first two using the epistolary form for "dramatic" purposes, and the last for "celebratory" purposes.

== Works ==
=== Novels ===
1. Pamela; or, Virtue Rewarded (1740–1761) – revised through 8 editions (1st edition: November 1740, 2nd edition: 14 February 1741, 3rd edition: 12 March 1741, 4th edition: 05 May 1741, 5th edition: 22 September 1741, 6th edition: 10 May 1742, 7th edition: 1754, and posthumous 8th edition: 28 October 1761)
2. Pamela in her Exalted Condition (1741–174[6?]) – the sequel to Pamela, usually published together in 4 Volumes – revised through 4 editions (1st edition: 07 December 1741, 2nd edition: between December 1741 and May 1742, 3rd edition: 10 May 1742, and 4th edition: 18 October 174[6?])
- Clarissa, or, the History of a Young Lady (1747–59) – revised through 4 editions - 1st edition: 1747-48, revised 2nd edition: 1749 (volumes 1-4 only), revised 3rd edition: 1750, and revised 4th edition: 1751 and 1759
  - Letters and Passages Restored to Clarissa (in the revised 4th edition: 1751)
1. The History of Sir Charles Grandison (1753–1761) – restored and corrected through 4 editions (1st edition: 1753-54, 2nd edition: 1754, 3rd edition: 1754, and 4th edition: 1756 (volume 7 only) and all volumes posthumously in 1762)
2. The History of Mrs. Beaumont – A Fragment – an unfinished manuscript which was actually a part of The History of Sir Charles Grandison but later conceived as a separate novel which was partially published posthumously in the Correspondence of Samuel Richardson Selected from the Original Manuscripts Bequeathed by him to his Family (volume 5) edited by Anna Laetitia Barbauld (1804). The full manuscript is still unpublished.

=== Supplements ===
- A Reply to the Criticism of Clarissa (1749)
- Meditations on Clarissa (1751)
- The Case of Samuel Richardson (1753)
- An Address to the Public (1754)
- 2 Letters Concerning Sir Charles Grandison (1754)
- A Collection of Moral Sentiments (1755)
- Conjectures on Original Composition in a Letter to the Author 1st and 2nd editions (1759) (with Edward Young)

=== As editor ===
- Aesop's Fables – 1st, 2nd, and 3rd editions (1739–1753)
- The Negotiations of Thomas Roe (1740)
- A Tour through Great Britain (4 Volumes) by Daniel Defoe – 3rd, 4th, 5th, and 6th editions (1742–1761)
- The Life of Sir William Harrington (knight) by Anna Meades – revised and corrected

=== Other works ===
- The Apprentice's Vade Mecum (1734)
- A Seasonable Examination of the Pleas and Pretensions Of the Proprietors of, and Subscribers to, Play-Houses, Erected in Defiance of the Royal License. With Observations on the Printed Case of the Players belonging to Drury-Lane and Covent-Garden Theatres (1735)
- Verses Addressed to Edward Cave and William Bowyer (1736)
- A compilation of letters published as a manual, with directions on How to think and act justly and prudently in the Common Concerns of Human Life (1741)
- The Familiar Letters 6 Editions (1741–1755)
- The Life and heroic Actions of Balbe Berton, Chevalier de Grillon (2 volumes) 1st and 2nd Editions by Lady Marguerite de Lussan (as assistant translator of an anonymous female translator)
- No. 97, The Rambler (1751)

=== Posthumous works ===
- 6 Letters upon Duelling (1765)
- Letter from an Uncle to his Nephew (1804)
