= Huhailou congshu =

Qing collectaneum

Huhailou congshu (simplified Chinese: 湖海楼丛书; traditional Chinese: 湖海樓叢書; Wade–Giles: Hu-hai-lou ts’ung-shu) is a Chinese congshu (collected series of texts). The series was compiled and printed in the Qing dynasty by Chen Chun 陈春. It comprises thirteen works, with a total of 109 juan.

Its titles cover Confucian classics, early philosophical texts, Daoist writings, and philological miscellanies. Most of the classical commentaries and writings of various philosophical schools were reprinted from high-quality copies preserved in the private library of Wang Jipei 汪继培. Wang's annotated and collated editions of works such as Qianfu lun 潜夫论, Shizi 尸子, and Yinwenzi 尹文子 are considered particularly careful and philologically precise. The Hanyu da zidian (HYDZD), for example, references the following works from the series: Shizi 尸子, Qianfu lun 潜夫论 (Wang Fu 王符), Longjin fengsui pan 龙筋凤髓判 (Zhang Zhuo 张鷟), and Ding'e zalu 订讹杂录 (Hu Mingyu 胡呜玉).

== Overview ==
The Huhailou congshu contains the following works (mostly following kanji.zinbun.kyoto-u.ac.jp):

- Zhouyi Zheng zhu 周易鄭注, twelve juan with an additional juan of editorial notes, written by Zheng Xuan 鄭玄 during the Han dynasty. The edition was compiled by Wang Yinglin 王應麟 in the Song dynasty and later revised in the Qing period by Ding Jie 丁杰. Textual corrections were carried out by Zhang Huiyan 張惠言, while Zang Yong 臧庸 contributed a preface and editorial record. The work was printed in 1819, during the Jiaqing reign.
- Lunyu leikao 論語類考, twenty juan, written by Chen Shiyuan 陳士元 during the Ming dynasty and printed in 1819.
- Mengzi zaji 孟子雜記, four juan, was also written by Chen Shiyuan 陳士元 during the Ming dynasty.
- Liezi 列子, eight juan, with the Liezi Chongxu zhizhen zhenjing shiwen 列子沖虛至德眞經釋文 in two juan. The main commentary was by Zhang Zhan 張湛 of the Jin dynasty, while the explanatory shiwen was compiled by Yin Jingshun 殷敬順 during the Tang dynasty. Additional supplements were added by Chen Jingyuan 陳景元 of the Song dynasty. The edition was printed in 1813.
- Shizi 尸子, two juan with an additional juan entitled cunyi 存疑, written and reconstructed by Wang Jipei 汪繼培 during the Qing dynasty. It was printed in 1812.
- Yinwenzi 尹文子, one juan, collated by Wang Jipei 汪繼培 during the Qing dynasty. The edition was printed in 1812.
- Qianfu lun 潛夫論, ten juan, written by Wang Fu 王符 during the Eastern Han and annotated by Wang Jipei 汪繼培 during the Qing dynasty. The edition was printed in 1817.
- Xuelin 學林, ten juan, was written by Wang Guanguo 王觀國 during the Song dynasty. The Qing reprint dates to 1809.
- Zhilin 巵林, ten juan with an additional juan of supplements, was compiled by Zhou Ying 周嬰 during the Ming dynasty. It was printed in 1815.
- Ding'e zalu 訂譌雜錄, ten juan, compiled by Hu Mingyu 胡嗚玉 during the Qing dynasty and printed in 1813.
- Longjin fengsui pan 龍筋鳳髓判, four juan, written by Zhang Zhuo 張鷟 during the Tang dynasty, annotated by Liu Yunpeng 劉允鵬 during the Ming dynasty, with additional corrections by Chen Chun 陳春 during the Qing dynasty. The edition was printed in 1811.
- Yongjia xiansheng ba mian feng 永嘉先生八面鋒, thirteen juan, written by Chen Fuliang 陳傅良 during the Song dynasty and printed in 1812.
- Huiji san fu 會稽三賦, one juan, written by Wang Shipeng 王十朋 during the Song dynasty, annotated by Zhou Shize 周世則 and supplemented by Shi Zhu 史鑄, both of the Song dynasty. The edition was printed in 1812.

== Bibliography ==
- Li Xueqin, Lü Wenyu (eds.): Siku da cidian 四庫大辭典, Changchun: Jilin daxue chubanshe 1996 (2 vols.), p. 2084a
- Hanyu da zidian. 1993 (one-volume ed.)
