= Nematollah Fazeli =

Iranian anthropologist, author, and translator (born 1964)

Nematollah Fazeli (born 23 August 1964) is an Iranian anthropologist, author, and translator.

== Career ==
Fazeli received his PhD in Social Anthropology from the School of Oriental and African Studies. He received a masters in cultural anthropology from Tehran University. He is currently associate professor of cultural anthropology and cultural studies at the Institute for Humanities and Cultural Studies. He has been a Research Associate of SOAS since 2005. Fazeli's formal academic training was in anthropology and the social sciences but he concurrently continued his studies of cultural studies and sociology of literature and art at a professional academic level. He is predominantly an ethnographer whose written works are on Iranian contemporary society, higher education studies, education, and urban studies.

Fazeli's main research undertaking has been the demonstration of modernity and the modernisation process in Iran. "Modernization or Contemporization of the Iranian Culture" (original title in Persian: “مدرن یا امروزی شدن فرهنگ ایران”), is a collection of his ethnographic case studies narrating the process of Iran's modernization through the prism of cultural studies. The book consists of two sections: “Reinvention or Contemporization of Traditions” and “Culture’s Mediazation and Technologization”, with nine chapters aiming to cast a look on the process of Iran's modernization, with his focus mainly on the 1380s (2001–2011).

Fazeli has written more than one hundred articles for scholarly journals and dozens editorials for venues such as "Sharq Newspaper". In Iran he has appeared in public forums and the media.

== Bibliography ==
- Nematollah, Fazeli (2006). Politics of Culture in Iran: Anthropology, Politics and Society in the Twentieth Century. London and New York: Routledge/BIPS Persian Studies Series. Routledge. doi:10.4324/9780203029879-8 (inactive 1 July 2025).
- 2008, Modernization and Contemporisation of Iranian Culture, Pazhuheshkade Motaleate Farhangi Vezarat Ulom.
- 2008, Culture and University: Anthropological and Cultural Studies Approaches, Nashre Sales
- 2011, Traveling Ethnographies: Descriptive Account of Today’s Culture and Society of the West, Nashre Araste.
- 2011, Cultural Anthropology: Essays on Applied and Theoretical Cultural Anthropology, Nashre Araste
- 2012, Ethnography of Art: Sociological and Anthropological Essays on Painting, Poetry, Film, Music, Photography and Art, Entesharat Fakhrakia
- 2012, Humanities and Social Sciences in Iran: Challenges, Developments and Strategies, Nasle Aftab
- 2012, Ethnography of Modernity: Indigenous Modernity and Indigenization of Modernity in Iran, Nashre Hermes
- 2012, Educational Ethnography: Some Ethnographic Studies on Iranian Education, Nashre Elm
- 2012, Culture and City: Cultural Turn in Urban Discourses Focusing on Tehran Studies. Tehran: Edare Kole Motaleate Ejtemai va Farhangi Share Tehran and Entesharate Tisa.
- Nematollah, Fazeli (2014). "Academic Disciplines: Functions, Dysfunctions and Developments" (PDF). Interdisciplinary Studies in the Humanities. 6 (1): 1–30.
- Alireza, Araghieh; Kourosh, Fathi Vajargah; Ahmadali, Foroughi Abari Foroughi Abari; Nematollah, Fazeli (2010). "Curriculum Integration: An Appropriate Approach for Developing a Multicultural Curriculum in Higher Education" (PDF). Interdisciplinary Studies in the Humanities. 2 (1): 149–165. doi:10.7508/isih.2010.05.006.
