= Sociological criticism =

Sociological criticism is literary criticism directed to understanding (or placing) literature in its larger social context; it codifies the literary strategies that are employed to represent social constructs through a sociological methodology. Sociological criticism analyzes both how the social functions in literature and how literature works in society. This form of literary criticism was introduced by Kenneth Burke, a 20th-century literary and critical theorist, whose article "Literature As Equipment for Living" outlines the specification and significance of such a critique.

Sociological criticism is influenced by New Criticism; however, it adds a sociological element as found with critical theory (Frankfurt School), and considers art as a manifestation of society, one that contains metaphors and references directly applicable to the existing society at the time of its creation. According to Kenneth Burke, works of art, including literature, "are strategic namings of situations" (Adams, 942) that allow the reader to better understand, and "gain a sort of control" (Adams, 942) over societal happenings through the work of art.

This complicates the basic trend of New Criticism which simply calls for a close textual reading without considering affective response or the author's intentions. While Burke also avoids affective response and authorial intention, he specifically considers pieces of art and literature as systematic reflections of society and societal behavior. He understands the way in which these artworks achieve this to be strategically employed through the work, and he therefore suggests the standardization of the methods used by the artists and authors so as to be able to consider works of art within a social context.

== Sociology and literature ==
=== Importance ===
Austin Harrington outlines in his book Art and Social Theory six ways in which art can be approached from a sociological standpoint: 1) humanistic historic approach, 2) Marxist social theory, 3) cultural studies, 4) theory of art in analytical philosophy, 5) anthropological studies of art, and 6) empirical studies of contemporary art institutions (Harrington, 15). The variety of sociological approaches introduced by Harrington confronts traditional, metaphysical approaches to art. According to Harrington, "sociological approaches generally possess a stronger sense of the material preconditions, historical flux and cultural diversity of discourse, practices and institutions of art," (Harrington, 31).

Harrington argues that pieces of art can serve as "normative sources of social understanding in their own right" (Harrington, 207); the ways in which these sources make manifest this social understanding is precisely what is of interest to Kenneth Burke. As Harrington observes, there are several methods of regarding art from a sociological perspective, and considering the sociological element is essential because art is inevitably full of references and commentaries on present-day society. Sociological critics are then to look at exactly how such references and commentaries function within the work of art, so that codification of their method is possible.

=== Employment ===
In Franco Moretti's article "The Dialectic of Fear", he addresses the methods by which Mary Shelley and Bram Stoker highlight the problems and inconsistencies within their societies through their respective novels Frankenstein, and Dracula. Moretti notes that the fear in Frankenstein lies in the protagonist and not the reader, so as to encourage the reader to "reflect on a number of important problems (the development of science, the ethic of family, respect for tradition) and agree – rationally – that these are threatened by powerful and hidden forces," (Moretti, 12). Shelley does this, notes Moretti, by keeping the novel in the past tense, and not hiding any of the monster's qualities, but rather informing the readers totally, (Moretti, 12). Stoker, by contrast, wants to scare his readers, and so Moretti recognizes the way in which this is done: "the narrative time is always in the present, and the narrative order – always para tactic – never establishes causal connections ... the reader has only clues" (Moretti, 12). Kenneth Burke would approach these pieces of literature through their statements on society, and push for sociological critics to standardize methods like the ones employed by Shelley and Stoker as a way of regarding art as a function of, and functioning in, society – a criticism technique that "cut[s] across previously established disciplines" (Adams, 942).

=== Types ===
There are many sub classifications of sociological criticism, two of the most prominent being Marxist criticism and feminist criticism.

== See also ==
- Literary criticism
- Literary theory
- Comparative literature
- Sociology of literature
