= Sociology of literature =

Aspect of sociology

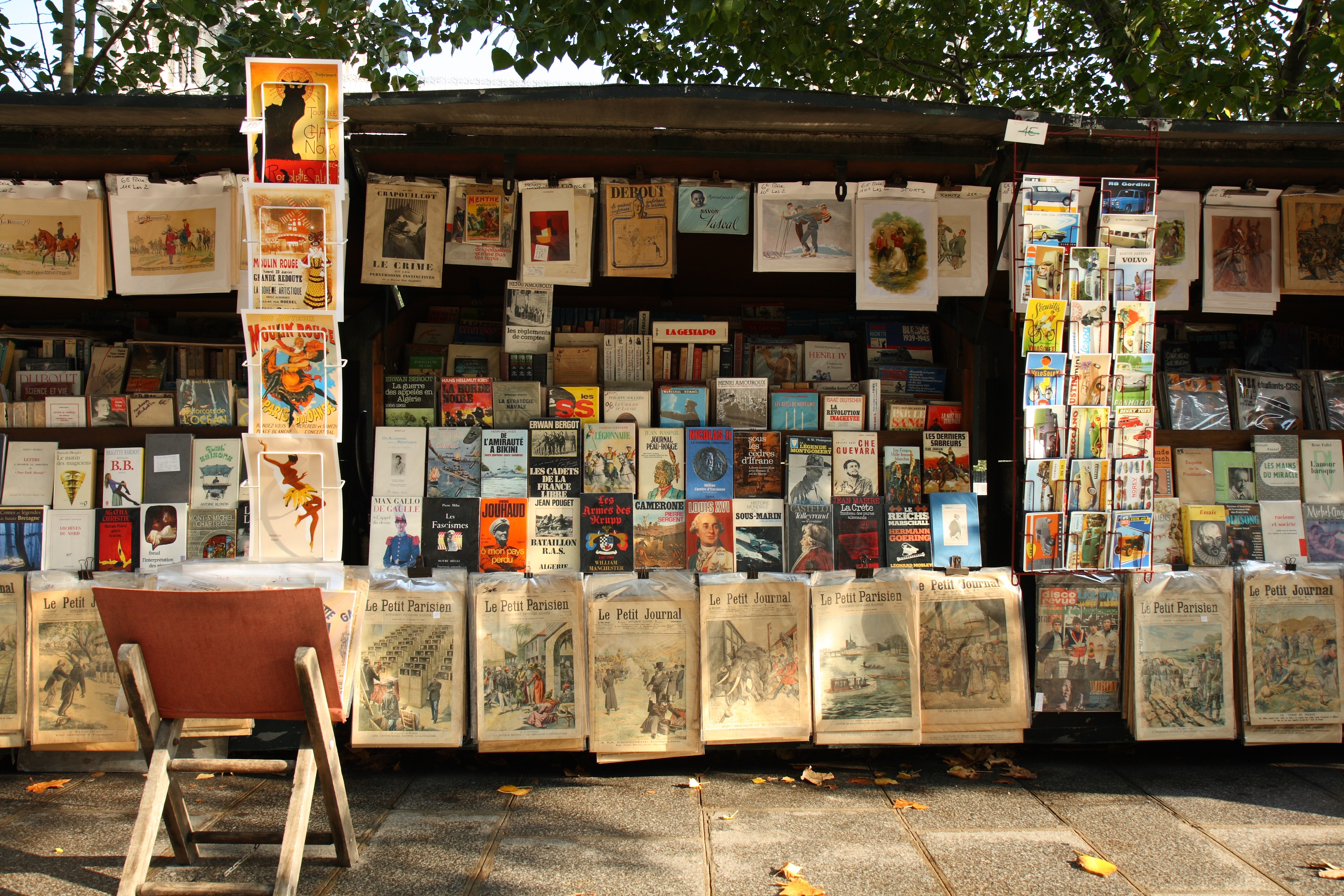
A stand of a bouquiniste (French term for second-hand books resellers), in Paris, near the Cathedral Notre-Dame of Paris.

The sociology of literature is a subfield of the sociology of culture. It studies the social production of literature and its social implications. A notable example is Pierre Bourdieu's 1992 Les Règles de L'Art: Genèse et Structure du Champ Littéraire, translated by Susan Emanuel as Rules of Art: Genesis and Structure of the Literary Field (1996).

== Classical sociology ==
None of the 'founding fathers' of sociology produced a detailed study of literature, but they did develop ideas that were subsequently applied to literature by others. Karl Marx's theory of ideology has been directed at literature by Pierre Macherey, Terry Eagleton and Fredric Jameson. Max Weber's theory of modernity as cultural rationalisation, which he applied to music, was later applied to all the arts, literature included, by Frankfurt School writers such as Theodor Adorno and Jürgen Habermas. Emile Durkheim's view of sociology as the study of externally defined social facts was redirected towards literature by Robert Escarpit. Bourdieu's work is clearly indebted to Marx, Weber and Durkheim.

== Lukács and the theory of the novel ==
An important first step in the sociology of literature was taken by Georg Lukács's The Theory of the Novel, first published in German in 1916, in the Zeitschrift fur Aesthetik und Allgemeine Kunstwissenschaft. In 1920 it was republished in book form and this version strongly influenced the Frankfurt School. A second edition, published in 1962, was similarly influential on French structuralism. The Theory of the Novel argued that, whilst the classical epic poem had given form to a totality of life pregiven in reality by the social integration of classical civilisation, the modern novel had become 'the epic of an age in which the extensive totality of life is no longer directly given'. The novel form is therefore organised around the problematic hero in pursuit of problematic values within a problematic world.

Lukács's second distinctive contribution to the sociology of literature was The Historical Novel, written in German but first published in Russian in 1937, which appeared in English translation in 1962. Here, Lukács argued that the early 19th century historical novel's central achievement was to represent realistically the differences between pre-capitalist past and capitalist present. This was not a matter of individual talent, but of collective historical experience, because the French Revolution and the revolutionary and Napoleonic wars had made history for the first time a mass experience. He went on to argue that the success of the 1848 revolutions led to the decline of the historical novel into 'decorative monumentalization' and the 'making private of history'. The key figures in the historical novel were thus those of the early 19th century, especially Sir Walter Scott.

Lukács was an important influence on Lucien Goldmann's Towards a Sociology of the Novel, Alan Swingewood's discussion of the sociology of the novel in Part 3 of Laurenson and Swingewood's The Sociology of Literature and Franco Moretti's Signs Taken for Wonders.

== The Frankfurt School ==
Founded in 1923, the Institute for Social Research at the University of Frankfurt developed a distinctive kind of 'critical sociology' indebted to Marx, Weber and Freud. Leading Frankfurt School critics who worked on literature included Adorno, Walter Benjamin and Leo Löwenthal. Adorno's Notes to Literature, Benjamin's The Origin of German Tragic Drama and Löwentahl's Literature and the Image of Man were each influential studies in the sociology of literature. Löwenthal continued this work at the University of California, Berkeley, during the 1950s.

Adorno's Notes to Literature is a collection of essays, the most influential of which is probably 'On Lyric Poetry and Society'. It argued that poetic thought is a reaction against the commodification and reification of modern life, citing Goethe and Baudelaire as examples. Benjamin's The Origin of German Tragic Drama argued that the extreme 'sovereign violence' of the 16th and 17th century German 'Trauerspiel' (literally mourning play, less literally tragedy) playwrights expressed the historical realities of princely power far better than had classical tragedy.

Habermas succeeded Adorno to the Chair of Sociology and Philosophy at Frankfurt. Habermas's first major work, Strukturwandel der Öffentlichkeit was published in German in 1962, and in English translation as The Structural Transformation of the Public Sphere in 1989. It attempted to explain the socio-historical emergence of middle-class public opinion in the seventeenth and eighteenth centuries. Developing a new kind of institutional sociology of literature, it argued that the public sphere had been organised around literary salons in France, learned and literary societies in Germany, and coffee houses in England. These institutions sustained the early novel, newspaper and periodical press.

== The sociology of the avant-garde ==
Peter Bürger was Professor of French and Comparative Literature at the University of Bremen. His Theorie der Avantgarde was published in German in 1974 and in English translation in 1984. Like Habermas, Bürger was interested in the institutional sociology of literature and art. He postulated a historical typology of aesthetic social relations, measured along three main axes, the function of the artwork, its mode of production and its mode of reception. This gave him three main kinds of art, sacral, courtly and bourgeois. Bourgeois art, he argued, had as its function individual self-understanding and was produced and received individually. It became a celebration in form of the liberation of art from religion, the court and, eventually, even the bourgeoisie. Modernist art was thus an autonomous social 'institution', the preserve of an increasingly autonomous intellectual class. The 'historical avant-garde' of the inter-war years developed as a movement within and against modernism, he concluded, as an ultimately unsuccessful revolt against precisely this autonomy.

Habermas adopts a very similar approach in his own account of the avant-garde.

== The sociology of the book trade ==
Robert Escarpit held the position of Professor of Comparative Literature at the University of Bordeaux and founded the Centre for the Sociology of Literary Facts. His works included The Sociology of Literature, (French: Sociologie de la littérature) published in French in 1958 and in English translation in 1971, and The Book Revolution (French: La Révolution du livre), published in French in 1965 and in English in 1966. In Durkheimian fashion, Escarpit aimed to concern himself only with the externally defined "social facts" of literature, especially those registered in the book trade. His focus fell on the "community of writers", understood in aggregate as "generations" and "teams". He extended the definition of literature to include all "non-functional" writing and also insisted that literary success resulted from "a convergence of intentions between author and reader".

Lewis Coser in the United States and Peter H. Mann in Britain carried out analogously empirical studies of the sociology of the book trade.

Lucien Febvre and Henri-Jean Martin's L'Apparition du livre, first published in French 1958 and in English translation as The Coming of the Book in 1976, is - strictly speaking - a work of social history (Febvre was a leading figure in the Annales school of historiography). But it is deeply sociological in character - Annales history was determinedly social scientific - and provides a systematic account of the long-run development of the European book trade (it covers the period from 1450 to 1800).

== Genetic structuralism ==
Lucien Goldmann was Director of Studies at the School for Advanced Studies in the Social Sciences in Paris and founding Director of the Centre for the Sociology of Literature at the Free University of Brussels. Like Escarpit, Goldmann was influenced by Durkheim: hence, his definition of the subject matter of sociology as the 'study of the facts of consciousness'. But he was also interested in developing a sociology of the text. The central task of the literary sociologist, he argued, was to bring out the objective meaning of the literary work by placing it in its historical context, studied as a whole.

Goldmann defined the creating subject as transindividual, that is, as an instance of Durkheim's 'collective consciousness'. Following Marx and Lukács, however, Goldmann also assumed that group consciousness was normally class consciousness. The mediating agency between a social class and the work of literature then became the 'world vision', which binds the individual members of a social class together. Le Dieu caché, his study of Blaise Pascal and Jean Racine, was published in French in 1955 and in English translation as The Hidden God in 1964. It identified 'structural homologies' between the Jansenist 'tragic vision', the textual structures of Pascal's Pensées and Racine's plays, and the social position of the seventeenth-century 'noblesse de robe'. Goldmann's structuralism was 'genetic' because it sought to trace the genesis of literary structures in extra-literary phenomena.

In 1964 Goldmann published Pour une Sociologie du Roman translated by Alan Sheridan as Towards a Sociology of the Novel in 1974. Like Lukács, Goldmann sees the novel as revolving around the problematic hero's search for authentic values in a degraded society. But Goldmann also postulates a 'rigorous homology' between the literary form of the novel and the economic form of the commodity. The early novel, he argues, is concerned with individual biography and the problematic hero, but, as competitive capitalism evolves into monopoly capitalism, the problematic hero progressively disappears. The period between the First and Second World Wars witnesses a temporary experiment with the community as collective hero: Goldmann's example is André Malraux. But the main line of development is characterised by the effort to write the novel of 'the absence of subjects'. Here, Goldmann's example is the nouveau roman of Alain Robbe-Grillet and Nathalie Sarraute.

Andrew Milner's John Milton and the English Revolution (1981) is essentially an application of Goldmann's genetic structuralism to the study of seventeenth-century English literature.

== Sociocriticism ==
Goldmann's sociology of literature remains significant in itself and as a source of inspiration, both positive and negative, to the kind of 'sociocriticism' developed by Edmond Cros, Pierre Zima and their co-workers in France and Canada.

== Neo-Marxian ideology critique ==
Marx used the term ideology to denote the inner connectedness of culture, including literature, and class. The philosopher Louis Althusser elaborated on this notion in the early 1970s, arguing that ideology functions so as to constitute biological individuals as social 'subjects' by representing their imaginary relation to their real conditions of existence.

For Althusser himself art was not ideology. But his theory was applied to literature by Macherey in France, Eagleton in Britain and Jameson in the United States. The central novelty of Eagleton's Criticism and Ideology was its argument that literature could be understood as 'producing' ideology, in the sense of performing it. Jameson's The Political Unconscious argued that literary analysis can be focussed on three distinct levels, 'text', 'ideologeme' and 'ideology of form', each of which has its socio-historical corollary, in the equivalent 'semantic horizon' of political history, society and mode of production. The version of ideology Jameson applies to all three levels is essentially Althusserian. The novelty of his position, however, was to argue for a 'double hermeneutic' simultaneously concerned with ideology and utopia.

Macherey, Eagleton and Jameson were literary critics by profession, but their applications of ideology-critique to literature are sociological in character, insofar as they seek to explain literary phenomena in extra-literary terms.

== Bourdieu ==
Bourdieu was Professor of Sociology at the Collège de France and Director of the Centre de Sociologie Européenne. His first major contribution to the sociology of literature (and other arts) was La Distinction, published in French in 1979 and in English translation in 1984. It is based on detailed sociological surveys and ethnographic observation of the social distribution of cultural preferences. Bourdieu identified three main zones of taste, 'legitimate', 'middle-brow' and 'popular', which he found to be dominant respectively in the educated sections of the dominant class, the middle classes and the working classes. He described legitimate taste as centred on an 'aesthetic disposition' to assert the primacy of form over function. The 'popular aesthetic', by contrast, is based on continuity between art and life and 'a deep-rooted demand for participation'. Hence, its hostility to representations of objects that in real life are either ugly or immoral. Artistic and social 'distinction' are inextricably interrelated, he concluded, because the 'pure gaze' implies a break with ordinary attitudes towards the world and, as such, is a 'social break'.

The Rules of Art is more specifically focused on literature, especially the significance of Gustave Flaubert for the making of modern French literature. Bourdieu postulated a model of 'the field of cultural production' as structured externally in relation to the 'field of power' and internally in relation to two 'principles of hierarchization', the heteronomous and the autonomous. The modern literary and artistic field is a site of contestation between the heteronomous principle, subordinating art to economy, and the autonomous, resisting such subordination. In Bourdieu's map of the French literary field in the late nineteenth century, the most autonomous genre, that is, the least economically profitable - poetry - is to the left, whilst the most heteronomous, the most economically profitable - drama - is to the right, with the novel located somewhere in between. Additionally, higher social status audiences govern the upper end of the field and lower status audiences the lower end. Flaubert's distinctive achievement in L'Éducation sentimentale was, in Bourdieu's account, to have understood and defined the rules of modern autonomous art.

== The rise of the novel ==
One of the earliest English-language contributions to the sociology of literature is The Rise of the Novel (1957) by Ian Watt, Professor of English at Stanford University. For Watt, the novel's 'novelty' was its 'formal realism', the idea 'that the novel is a full and authentic report of human experience'. His paradigmatic instances are Daniel Defoe, Samuel Richardson and Henry Fielding. Watt argued that the novel's concern with realistically described relations between ordinary individuals, ran parallel to the more general development of philosophical realism, middle-class economic individualism and Puritan individualism. He also argued that the form addressed the interests and capacities of the new middle-class reading public and the new book trade evolving in response to them. As tradesmen themselves, Defoe and Richardson had only to 'consult their own standards' to know that their work would appeal to a large audience.

== Cultural materialism ==
Raymond Williams was Professor of Drama at Cambridge University and one of the founders of contemporary cultural studies. He described his own distinctive approach as a 'cultural materialism', by which he meant a theory of culture 'as a (social and material) productive process' and of the arts 'as social uses of material means of production'. This is clearly a sociological perspective, as distinct from a literary-critical perspective. Hence, its most general exposition in the United States is The Sociology of Culture and in Britain it is Culture, a 1981 title in Fontana's New Sociology series. Although Williams's interests ranged widely across the whole field of literary and cultural studies, his major work was concentrated on literature and drama. He was thus a sociologist of culture, specialising in the sociology of literature.

In The Long Revolution (1961), Williams developed pioneering accounts of the sociology of the book trade, the sociology of authorship and the sociology of the novel. In The English Novel from Dickens to Lawrence (1970), he argued that the modern novel articulated a distinctively modern 'structure of feeling', the key problem of which was the 'knowable community'. In The Country and the City (1973) he developed a social history of English country-house poetry, aimed at demystifying the idealisations of rural life contained in the literature: 'It is what the poems are: not country life but social compliment; the familiar hyperboles of the aristocracy and its attendants'. His Marxism and Literature (1977) - simultaneously a critique of both Marxism and 'Literature' - is an extensive formal elaboration of Williams's own theoretical system.

Alan Sinfield's Faultlines: Cultural Materialism and the Politics of Dissident Reading (1992) and Literature, Politics and Culture in Postwar Britain (1997) are both clearly indebted to Williams. So, too, is Andrew Milner's Literature, Culture and Society (2005).

== World-systems theory ==
Franco Moretti was, by turn, Professor of English Literature at the University of Salerno, of Comparative Literature at Verona University and of English and Comparative Literature at Stanford University. His first book, Signs Taken for Wonders (1983) was subtitled Essays in the Sociology of Literary Forms and was essentially qualitative in method. His later work, however, became progressively more quantitative.

Applying Immanuel Wallerstein's world-systems theory to literature, Moretti argued, in Atlas of the European Novel (1998), that the nineteenth-century literary economy had comprised 'three Europes', with France and Britain at the core, most countries in the periphery and a variable semiperiphery located in between. Measured by the volume of translations in national bibliographies, he found that French novelists were more successful in the Catholic South and British in the Protestant North, but that the whole continent nonetheless read the leading figures from both. London and Paris 'rule the entire continent for over a century', he concluded, publishing half or more of all European novels.

Moretti's theses prompted much subsequent controversy, collected together in Christopher Prendergast's edited collection Debating World Literature (2004). Moretti himself expanded on the argument in his Distant Reading (2013).

== Recent developments ==
Building on earlier work in the production of culture, reception aesthetics and cultural capital, the sociology of literature has recently concentrated on readers' construction of meaning. New developments include studying the relationship between literature and group identities; concerning institutional and reader-response analysis; reintroducing the role of intentions of the author in literature; reconsidering the role of ethics and morality in literature and developing a clearer understanding of how literature is and is not like other media.

The sociology of literature has also recently taken an interest in the global inequality between First-World and Third-World authors, where the latter tend to be strongly dependent on the editorial decisions of publishers in Paris, London or New York and are often excluded from participation in the global literary market.

The journal New Literary History devoted a special issue to new approaches to the sociology of literature in Spring 2010.
