= The Rise of the Novel =

Ian Watt's 1957 book

The Rise of the Novel: Studies in Defoe, Richardson and Fielding
- 1957 Book cover
- Author: Ian Watt
- Subject: 1700–1799 — Criticism, interpretation — Fictional works
- Genre: Criticism, interpretation, etc
- Set in: 18th century novels
- Published: 1957
- Publisher: Chatto and Windus, Ltd., London, and University of California Press
- Publication place: United States
- Media type: Print, e-book, audio
- Pages: 319
- ISBN: 9780520013179 9780520013186
- OCLC: 170736
- Website: Official website

The Rise of the Novel: Studies in Defoe, Richardson and Fielding is a nonfiction book that recounts the confluence of events in literary history that defined the emergence of the novel in the eighteenth century. It was written by Ian Watt. It was originally published in 1957 by Chatto & Windus in London, followed by the University of California Press, United States, also in 1957.

== Synopsis ==
Ian Watt's The Rise of the Novel is seen as a major contribution for establishing how the novel appeared as a literary form during the 18th century. Also much of the discussion and commentary for over forty years, about the novel's beginnings, center on Watt's ideas in this book. The Rise of the Novel is an important work in the history of academic literary criticism. It is considered by many contemporary literary scholars as the seminal work on the origins of the novel, and an important study of literary realism. The book traces the rise of the modern novel to philosophical, economic and social trends and conditions that become prominent in the early 18th century.

=== A shifting society ===
In his book, Watt saw the appearance of the novel as a clear-cut "literary form" in the 18th century, which was a result of five fundamental shifts that occurred in society. These are:

1. A society-wide inclination for fiction that realistically represented life.
2. Readers aligned themselves with Individualism.
3. Readers were becoming more mature intellectually and emotionally.
4. The growing influence and power of the middle class.
5. A significant increase in female readership.

Watts said that the novel was a new literary genre that was born in the 18th century. He also thought that the novel is different from earlier forms of fiction. His focus is on formal realism as the most important aspect of this new genre. Watt says that these five social and cultural changes created a receptive audience for this new literary form. Additionally, he says that three authors — Daniel Defoe, Samuel Richardson, and Henry Fielding — are the pioneers of the novel, whose works within a single generation embodied this new genre. At the same time, these works reflected a changing society.

=== Historiography ===
Historians of the novel had already identified the above five fundamental changes in the reading public before Ian Watt's The Rise of the Novel in 1957. So, Watt wasn't the first to suggest the eighteenth century as the era when the novel emerged as a distinct literary form. But this has not detracted from his influence. He was part of a tradition of literary historians who shared this view. The idea that the novel is connected to societal changes wasn't a new discovery by Watt. Scholars had been aware of this link for at least three decades before his book.

Realism was an important topic in these earlier studies that focused on the novel. For example, Ernest A. Baker's multivolume History of the English Novel extensively discussed realism. Other scholars — Frank Godfrey Singer (in 1933), Bruce McCullough (in 1946), Arnold Kettle (in 1951), and Diana Neill (in 1951) — also discussed how close attention to realistic depictions are central to the novel's form.

Hence, while Watt's work has been influential, it wasn't original. It built upon a foundation of existing research that was in agreement with the importance of realism. Additionally, Watt never claimed originality, pointing out that "historians of the novel have... seen `realism' as the defining characteristic which differentiates the work of the early eighteenth-century novelists from previous fiction." Therefore, in this context, Watt's contribution can be seen more as being engaged in "codifying [an existing] body of knowledge."

Additionally, there are other aspects of the novel previously discussed by historians prior to Watt's book.

=== New Criticism ===
Significantly, Watt challenges the pervasive literary theory of his day, New Criticism, in which a work of literature functions as a self-contained, self-referential aesthetic object. In contrast, Watt insisted that "a work is not an autonomous object, [and] ideas and novels do not exist independently of each other." Rather, an artist's work is involuntarily enmeshed with the social and moral norms of their world and their time.

Also, Watt discusses historical and literary analysis to show how the novel's narratives are affected by the intellectual and social outlook of the 18th century. Here, Watt says that understanding an artwork requires taking into account its historical, social, and biographical context. This knowledge not only helps to understand the author's intended meaning but also the effects of a culture that were unseen to the author and their original audience. According to Watt, Literature is very important because it emulates the Zeitgeist, or spirit, of that era. It also "in turn becomes a significant part of the cultural and intellectual history."

== See also ==
- The True Story of the Novel
