= Peter V. Zima =

Peter Václav Zima is a literary critic and a social scientist born in Prague, in 1946. He is of Czech-German origin and has dual nationality such as Austrian and Dutch. He is emeritus professor of the Alpen-Adria-Universität in Klagenfurt (Austria) where he held the chair of General and Comparative Literature from 1983 to 2012.

== Education ==
He studied sociology and politics at the University of Edinburgh from 1965 to 1969 and gained two doctorates in the Sociology of Literature at the universities of Paris IV (Doctorat du 3e cycle: 1971.) and Paris I (Doctorat d'Etat: 1979).

== Career ==
He taught Sociology of Literature at the University of Bielefeld (Germany: 1972-1975) and Theory of Literature at the University of Groningen (Netherlands: 1976-1983). In 1983 he was appointed full professor of General and Comparative Literature at the Alpen-Adria-University in Klagenfurt (Austria). He worked as visiting professor at the Istituto Orientale in Naples (1985) and at the Universities of Leuven (1988), Graz (1991/92), Vienna (1994/95) and Santiago de Compostela (2004).

In 1998, he was elected corresponding Member of the Austrian Academy of Sciences; in Vienna in 2010, he became a member of the Academia Europaea in London. In 2014, he was appointed honorary professor at the East China Normal University, in Shanghai.

== Research ==
His fields of research include: theory of literature and aesthetics, sociology and social philosophy

1. Sociology of texts: Zima has developed a sociology of texts which draws partly on the works of the Russian philosopher and literary critic, Mikhail M. Bakhtin, and Algirdas J. Greimas, the Lithuanian semiotician. He attempts to explain all types of texts or discourses within the framework of a social and linguistic situation and in relation to group languages or sociolects.
2. Ideology and theory: In the context of this sociology, Zima has proposed a distinction between ideology and theory as discourses. Unlike ideology, which is a discourse structured by dualism, monologue and the claim to be identical with reality, theory is a discourse structured by ambivalence and a constructivist approach to the real which cannot be represented as such but only as a contingent construction to be assessed and tested in an open dialogue with competing theories.
3. Dialogical Theory: Zima has proposed Dialogical Theory as a new version of Critical Theory of the Frankfurt School (in the sense of Adorno and Horkheimer). The aim is to confront competing and contradictory sociological theories systematically in order to show that none of the sociological theories at stake can claim to be an adequate representation of society and that social reality with its trends and counter-trends can best be observed in a theoretical dialogue in which theories are made to collide in a kind of crash-test. To test theories in the social sciences, he proposes Otto Neurath's "Erschütterung" ("shaking") of theories or hypotheses as an alternative to Karl R. Popper's model of "falsification" or "refutation". In contrast to the natural sciences, the notion of "falsification" does not seem practicable in the cultural and social sciences. "Dialogical Theory" has been the subject of a lively and polemical discussion in Ethik und Sozialwissenschaften. Streitforum für Erwägungskultur, (EuS 10, 4)
4. Dialogical Subjectivity: Drawing on Bakhtin's dialogism, Zima develops a dialogical theory of the individual subject, arguing that subjectivity is an open-ended process which is best understood as a permanent dialogue with others and with alterity in general
5. Theory of Literature: In his work, The Philosophy of Modern Literary Theory (1999), Zima has reconstructed the philosophical and aesthetic foundations of literary theories from Anglo-American New Criticism and Russian Formalism to Deconstruction. The key argument is that literary theories can only be adequately understood in relation to the philosophies and aesthetics of Kant, Hegel and Nietzsche in which they originated.
6. Sociology of the novel: Zima has developed a sociological theory of the novel based on the thesis that increasing agnosticism due to the growing indeterminacy of social values affects the semantic and narrative structures of the (experimental) novel. While novels of the 19th century (e.g. Jane Austen's Pride and Prejudice, 1813) came about in a relatively well-defined value system and hence could resolve ambiguities of situations, characters and actions, modernist novels of the 20th century are marked by an unsurmountable ambivalence which narrators can no longer resolve: truth and lie, good and evil become inseparable, and this ambivalence of characters and their actions weakens the narrative structure of novels such as Joyce's Ulysses, Kafka's The Trial or Musil's The Man without Qualities. As in Nietzsche's work, this ambivalence tends to turn into indifference (as interchangeable values) which is heralded by Camus' The Outsider and underlies Claude Simon's, Butor's or Robbe-Grillet's Nouveaux Romans. (Cf. Joseph Jurt "Von der Ambiguität zur Indifferenz. Zu Peter V. Zimas Versuch einer Sozialgeschichte des modernen Romans" Neue Züricher Zeitung, 09.03.1990.)
7. Modern / Postmodern: As a development of these ideas, Zima defines late modernity or modernism as a problematic structured by ambivalence and postmodernity as a problematic structured by indifference as interchangeability of cultural values.

Zima has published books and articles in four languages: English, German, French and Dutch; articles in Italian, Spanish and Czech. His books have been translated into nine languages: Arabic, Chinese, Czech, English, Italian, Korean, Persian, Spanish and Turkish.

== Publications ==
=== Books as author ===
==== English books ====
- The Philosophy of Modern Literary Theory, Athlone-Continuum, London, 1999 ( ISBN 978-0-8264-7893-1);
- Deconstruction and Critical Theory, Continuum, London-New York, 2002 ( ISBN 978-1-84790-008-1) (English translation of Die Dekonstruktion: cf. below);
- What is Theory? Cultural Theory as Discourse and Dialogue, Continuum, London-New York, 2007 ( ISBN 0-8264-9050-6) (augmented English version of Was ist Theorie?: cf. below);
- Modern / Postmodern. Society, Philosophy, Literature, Continuum, London-New York, 2010 ( ISBN 978-1-4411-9901-0) (augmented English version of Moderne / Postmoderne: cf. below);
- Subjectivity and Identity. Between Modernity and Postmodernity, Bloomsbury, London-New York, 2015 (ISBN 978-1-78093-780-9) (augmented English version of Theorie des Subjekts: cf. below).
- Discourse and Power. An Introduction to Critical Narratology: Who Narrates Whom? Routledge, London-New York, 2023.

==== French books ====
- Le Désir du mythe. Une lecture sociologique de Marcel Proust, Nizet, Paris, 1973;
- Goldmann. Dialectique de l'immanence, Ed. Universitaires, Paris, 1973;
- L'Ecole de Francfort. Dialectique de la particularité, Ed. Universitaires, Paris, 1974, L'Harmattan, Paris, 2005 ( ISBN 2-7475-7719-8);
- Pour une sociologie du texte littéraire, UGE : 10/18, Paris, 1978, L'Harmattan, Paris, 2000 ( ISBN 2-7384-9081-6) (French version of Kritik der Literatursoziologie : cf. below);
- L'Ambivalence romanesque. Proust – Kafka – Musil, Le Sycomore, Paris (1980), L'Harmattan, Paris, 2002 (2nd ed.) ( ISBN 2-7475-3117-1);
- L'Indifférence romanesque. Sartre – Moravia – Camus, Le Sycomore, Paris (1982), L'Harmattan, Paris, 2005 (2nd ed.) ( ISBN 2-7475-8001-6);
- Manuel de sociocritique, Picard, Paris, 1985, Paris, L'Harmattan, Paris, 2000 (2nd ed.) ( ISBN 2-7384-9087-5);
- (an enlarged version of the Dutch book Literatuur en maatschappij. Inleiding in de literatuur- en tekstsociologie, Van Gorcum, Assen, 1981, ISBN 90-232-1831-0);
- La Déconstruction. Une critique, PUF, Paris, 1994 (ISBN 9-782-130-4599-72);
- La Négation esthétique. Le sujet, le beau et le sublime de Mallarmé et Valéry à Adorno et Lyotard, L'Harmattan, Paris, 2002 ( ISBN 2-7475-3116-3);
- Critique littéraire et esthétique. Les fondements esthétiques des théories de la littérature, L'Harmattan, Paris, 2003 ( ISBN 2-7475-5810-X) (French version of The Philosophy of Modern Literary Theory: cf. supra);
- Théorie critique du discours. La discursivité entre Adorno et le postmodernisme, L'Harmattan, Paris, 2003 ( ISBN 9782747552479);
- Texte et société. Perspectives sociocritiques, L'Harmattan, Paris, 2011 ( ISBN 978-2-296-55926-4);
- Essai et essayisme. Le potentiel théorique de l'essai: De Montaigne jusqu'à la postmodernité, Classiques Garnier, Paris, 2018 ( ISBN 9782406068358) (augmented version of Essay / Essayismus: cf. below).

==== German books ====
- Kritik der Literatursoziologie, Suhrkamp, Frankfurt, 1978 ( ISBN 3-518-10857-3);
- Textsoziologie. Eine kritische Einführung, Metzler, Stuttgart, 1980 ( ISBN 978-3-476-10190-7);
- Der gleichgültige Held. Textsoziologische Untersuchungen zu Sartre, Moravia und Camus, Metzler, Stuttgart, 1983, WVT, Trier, 2004 ( ISBN 3-88476-600-7) (revised and augmented German version of L'indifférence romanesque: cf. above);
- Roman und Ideologie. Zur Sozialgeschichte des modernen Romans, Fink, Munich, 1986 ( ISBN 3-7705-2365-2);
- Ideologie und Theorie. Eine Diskurskritik, Francke, Tübingen, 1989 ( ISBN 3-7720-1823-8);
- Literarische Ästhetik. Methoden und Modelle der Literaturwissenschaft, Francke, Tübingen, 1991, 3rd enlarged ed. 2020 ( ISBN 978-3-8252-1590-3, 978-3-8252-5481-0);
- Komparatistik. Einführung in die Vergleichende Literaturwissenschaft, Francke, Tübingen, 1992, 2nd enlarged ed. 2011 ( ISBN 978-3-8252-1705-1);
- Die Dekonstruktion. Einführung und Kritik, Francke-UTB, Tübingen, 1994, 2nd ed. 2016 (enlarged German version of La Déconstruction: cf. above) ( ISBN 978-3-8252-4689-1);
- Moderne / Postmoderne. Gesellschaft – Philosophie – Literatur, Francke-UTB, Tübingen, 1997, 4th augmented ed. 2016 ( ISBN 9-783825-246907);
- Theorie des Subjekts. Subjektivität und Identität zwischen Moderne und Postmoderne, Francke-UTB, Tübingen, 2000, 4th revised ed. 2017 ( ISBN 978-3-8252-4796-6);
- Das literarische Subjekt. Zwischen Spätmoderne und Postmoderne, Francke, Tübingen, 2001, 2024 2nd ed. (ISBN 978-3-381-12711-5);
- Was ist Theorie? Theoriebegriff und Dialogische Theorie in den Kultur- und Sozialwissenschaften, Francke-UTB, Tübingen, 2004, 2nd revised ed. 2017 ( ISBN 978-3-8252-4797-3);
- Ästhetische Negation. Das Subjekt, das Schöne und das Erhabene von Mallarmé und Valéry zu Adorno und Lyotard, Königshausen und Neumann, Würzburg, 2005 (augmented version of La Négation esthétique: cf. supra), 2nd enlarged edition 2018 ( ISBN 978-3-8260-6178-3);
- Der europäische Künstlerroman. Von der romantischen Utopie zur postmodernen Parodie, Tübingen, Francke, Tübingen, 2008 ( ISBN 978-3-7720-8263-4);
- Narzissmus und Ichideal, Psyche – Gesellschaft – Kultur, Francke, Tübingen, 2009 ( ISBN 9783772083372);
- Komparatistische Perspektiven. Zur Theorie der Vergleichenden Literaturwissenschaft, Francke, Tübingen, 2011 ( ISBN 978-3-7720-8407-2);
- Essay / Essayismus. Zum theoretischen Potenzial des Essays von Adorno bis zur Postmoderne, Königshausen und Neumann, Würzburg, 2012, 2024, 2nd ed. ( ISBN 978-3-8260-4727-5);
- Entfremdung. Pathologien der postmodernen Gesellschaft, Francke-UTB, Tübingen, 2014 ( ISBN 978-3-8252-4305-0);
- Soziologische Theoriebildung. Ein Handbuch auf dialogischer Basis, Francke-UTB, Tübingen, 2020 ( ISBN 978-3-8252-5370-7);
- Diskurs und Macht. Einführung in die herrschaftskritische Erzähltheorie, Verlag Barbara Budrich, Opladen & Toronto, 2022 ( ISBN 978-3-8252-5830-6);
- Die Kritische Theorie zwischen Spätmoderne und Postmoderne: Nostalgie als Kritik, Narr Francke Attempto Verlag, Tübingen, 2024 (ISBN 978-3-381-12701-6).
- Italian book:
- Breve introduzione alla sociologia del testo, Edizioni Libreria Sapere, Naples, 1985.

==== Books as editor and co-editor ====
- Textsemiotik als Ideologiekritik, Suhrkamp, Frankfurt, 1977 ( ISBN 3-518-10796-8);
- Texte et idéologie. Degrés. Revue de synthèse à orientation sémiologique, No. 24-25, hivers 1980-1981;
- Semiotics and Dialectics. Ideology and the Text, Benjamins, Amsterdam 1981 ( ISBN 90-272-1505-7);
- Europäische Avantgarde (ed. with J. Strutz), Peter Lang, Frankfurt-New York, 1987 ( ISBN 3-8204-0057-5);
- Komparatistik als Dialog. Literatur und interkulturelle Beziehungen in der Alpen-Adria-Region und in der Schweiz (ed. with J. Strutz), Peter Lang, Frankfurt-New York, 1991 ( ISBN 3-631-42279-2);
- Literatur intermedial. Musik, Malerei, Photographie, Film, Wiss. Buchgesellschaft, Darmstadt, 1995 ( ISBN 3-534-12315-8);
- Literarische Polyphonie. Übersetzung und Mehrsprachigkeit in der Literatur (ed. with J. Strutz), Narr, Tübingen, 1996 ( ISBN 3-8233-5163-X);
- Vergleichende Wissenschaften. Interdisziplinarität und Interkulturalität in den Komparatistiken, Narr, Tübingen, 2000 (ISBN 3-8233-5212-1);
- Strategien der Verdummung. Infantilisierung in der Fun-Gesellschaft (ed. with J. Wertheimer), Beck, Munich, 2001, 6th ed. 2006 ( ISBN 978-3-406-45963-4);
- Krise und Kritik der Sprache. Literatur zwischen Spätmoderne und Postmoderne (ed. with R. Kacianka), Francke, Tübingen, 2004 ( ISBN 3-77-20-8055-3);
- Kritische Theorie heute (ed. with R. Winter), Transcript, Bielefeld, 2007 ( ISBN 3-89942-530-8).
- Fiction:
- Grenzgang. Prosa, Hoffmann und Campe, Hamburg, 1979 ( ISBN 3-455-08741-8).

== Prizes and distinctions ==
- Heatly Prize in Politics (Department of Politics University of Edinburgh, 1969)
- Woitschach-Forschungspreis im Stifterverband für die Deutsche Wissenschaft (Bonn, 1993)
- Corresponding Member of The Austrian Academy of Sciences (Vienna, 1998)
- Member of the Academia Europaea (London, 2010)
- Honorary Professor of East China Normal University (2014)

== See also ==
- Sociological criticism
- Comparative literature
- Postmodernism
