= The True Story of the Novel =

1996 non-fiction book by Margaret Anne Doody

- 1996 Book cover
- Author: Margaret Anne Doody
- Subject: Fiction technique, history and criticism. Literary criticism. Interpretation.
- Published: 1996
- Publisher: Rutgers University Press
- Publication place: United States
- Media type: Print, E-book
- Pages: 580
- ISBN: 9780585234205 9780813524535
- OCLC: 44964682
- Dewey Decimal: 809.3
- LC Class: PN3355.D66 1996
- Website: Official website
- Includes bibliographical references (p. 531-553) and index.

The True Story of the Novel is an extensive nonfiction book that is a feminist critique and revisionist history of the novel. It was written by Margaret Anne Doody and published by Rutgers University Press in 1996.

== Synopsis ==
Doody says the ancient novel has significantly impacted Western culture and it influenced changes in the culture over time. She focuses on the high quality of writing that these ancient novels seem to demonstrate. Doody enlarges the traditional definition of the novel by noting the similarities between these works found across the two thousand years of their existence. This approach views the novel as both an archetype throughout time and a modern form of creation.

One of the main thrusts of this book is to challenge the established divisions within literary history, such as those between novels and romances, ancient and modern works, realistic and fantastical narratives, and historical accounts and fictional creations. It aims to break down these conventional divisions and create a new understanding of the novel's evolution.

In the introductory chapter, the author notes Nietzsche's criticism of Alexandrian culture, which Nietzsche saw as corrupt and decadent from divergent conditions and foreign influences. However, the author flips this negative view around, full-circle, using Nietzsche's descriptions not to condemn the variety of cultures but to tout it as a model for inclusivity.

Hence, Doody aims to challenge "parochial" (narrow) theories such as in Ian Watt's seminal work, The Rise of the Novel, that have focused on a chosen time period or language. She argues that such views discount significant influences and discount the evolution of the novel over time and in different cultures.

== Critique ==
Ashley Brown, writing for an academic journal, The Comparatist, says that Doody incorrectly assumes that most students believe that the novel originated in 18th-century England. Also, Brown says that Doody challenges Ian Watt's seminal work, The Rise of the Novel. While Watt primarily focuses on English authors like Defoe, Fielding, Richardson and perhaps Sterne, he never asserts that the novel was invented during this period. Also in defense of Watt, Brown says that Watt correctly emphasizes the significant rise in the novel's importance within British literature during this era, particularly through the influence of authors like Richardson on continental European literature.

Peter New, writing for an academic journal, The Modern Language Review, says that the examples of common tropes that Doody employs to advance her argument that the novel has a millennia-long history does not succeed. In this, New says that Doody inaccurately contends that the novel's history encompasses "a continuous history from ancient Greek and Latin prose fiction, through Medieval and Renaissance works in the Romance languages" as well as a geography that goes much further than has been acknowledged by Western scholars. He also says that the book has too much encyclopedic detail to be convincing.

== Awards ==
The True Story of the Novel was chosen as a "finalist for the 1997 National Book Critics Circle Awards in the criticism category."
