= You Xian Ku =

Cover of a modern edition of the book You Xian Ku

Pages of a printed edition of You Xian Ku

You Xian Ku or Youxian ku (Chinese: 遊仙窟 ; translated as "A Visit to a Fairy Cave", "Cavern of the Disporting Fairies" or "Journey to the Immortals' Grotto") is a Chinese tale from the Tang dynasty, written by Zhang Zhuo (張鷟, also known as Zhang Wencheng 張文成) (658–730). It is one of the most noted works of chuanqi fiction (唐人傳奇).

The text, depends on the editions, has around 12,500 characters, (Note: The Classical Chinese version of You Xian Ku have around 12,482 Chinese characters. The vernacular versions of You Xian Ku are longer.) making it one of the longer early Tang chuanqi literature. The text's composition has been dated to between 681 and 684 in the late 7th-century.

== Author and story ==
Zhang Zhuo (Chinese: 張鷟, born 658–730 CE), bestowed the honorary name of Wencheng (文成), was a Tang dynasty jinshi, a former imperial censor (御史), and a native of Luze, Shenzhou (now Shenxian 深縣 county, Hebei province).

You Xian Ku is a story of the author's purported first-hand account visiting Heyuan (now Qinghai province, Xinghai county), passing through Jishi (積石) mountain. "The days turn to nights, and the road is far. The horse is weary and the man tired" (日晚途遙, 馬疲人乏). He stayed in the fairy grotto and met two women by chance: Cui Shi Niang (崔十娘) and Wu Sao (五嫂), a widow. There they drank wine, wrote poetry, flirted, and joked around.

The text is written in a mixture of different styles, including pianwen (parallel prose) and bianwen, and it features rhymes and is leisurely in tone. (Note: Poem text: 天上無雙，人間有一。 依依弱柳，束作腰支； 焰焰橫波，翻成眼尾。 才舒兩頰，孰疑地上無華； 乍出雙眉，漸覺天邊失月。)

Some scholars called the work a "new form of novel" (新體小說). You Xian Ku can be considered as one of the Tang dynasty's earliest romances, based on the wanton lives of prostitutes first met by Tang scholars. It has had a profound influence on the love stories and romance novels written by later generations of writers. The work's popularity in Japan also proved to be enormous. According to the Old Book of Tang, every time Japan sent an envoy to China during the Tang dynasty, they had to pay a lot to buy copies of the book. In the late Qing dynasty, the book was reprinted and sent back to China.

In Bai Xianyong's (白先勇) novel Crystal Boys, the chapter "Journey to the Goblin Cave" (You Yao Ku, 遊妖窟) is a parody of You Xian Ku.

Illustrations of scenes from You Xian Ku

== See also ==
- The Tale of Genji
- Chuanqi
