= Qianfu Lun =

The Qianfu Lun (Chinese: 潛夫論, Qiánfū lún, "Comments of a Recluse"), also known by its Wade-Giles romanization Ch'ien-fu Lun, is a political-metaphysical text by the Later Han philosopher Wang Fu. It contains criticisms of contemporary societies, especially the power of consort clans and the growing regionalism. In the work, Wang Fu strongly supports the Confucian model of good government and humanism.
