= Ian Watt =

Literary critic, professor at Stanford (1917-1999)

Ian Watt (9 March 1917 – 13 December 1999) was a literary critic, literary historian and professor of English at Stanford University.

== Biography ==
Born 9 March 1917, in Windermere, Westmorland, in England, Watt was educated at Dover County School for Boys and at St John's College, Cambridge, where he earned first-class honours in English.

Watt joined the British Army at the age of 22 and served with distinction in the Second World War as an infantry lieutenant from 1939 to 1946. He was wounded in the Battle of Singapore in February 1942 and listed as "missing, presumed killed in action".

He had been taken prisoner by the Japanese and remained at the Changi Prison until 1945, working with other prisoners on the construction of the Burma Railway which crossed Thailand, a feat that inspired the Pierre Boulle book The Bridge over the River Kwai, and the film adaptation, The Bridge on the River Kwai by David Lean. Watt criticised both the book and the film for the liberties they took with the historical details of the prisoner of war experience and, more subtly, their refusal to acknowledge the moral complexities of the situation. More than 12,000 prisoners died during the building of the railway, most of them from disease, and Watt was critically ill from malnutrition for several years. "There was a period when I expected to die", Watt told The San Francisco Examiner in a 1979 interview. "But I didn't know how sick I was until they gave me some of the vitamin pills that had just come into the camp. I remember being very surprised that I was considered sick enough to receive vitamins."

Watt died in Menlo Park, California, after a long illness and a spell in a nursing home.

== Literary criticism ==
A key element Watt explores is the decline in importance of the philosophy of classical antiquity, with its various strains of idealistic thought that viewed human experience as composed of universal Platonic "forms" with an innate perfection. Such a view of life and philosophy dominated writers from ancient times to the Renaissance, resulting in classical poetic forms and genres with essentially flat plots and characters. (Russian theorist Mikhail Bakhtin has written that such literature can literally be read front to back, or back to front, with no significant difference in effect.) These philosophical beliefs began to be replaced perhaps in the later Renaissance, into the Enlightenment, and, most importantly, in the early 18th century. The importance of rationalist philosophers such as John Locke, Descartes, Spinoza, and many others who followed them, and the scientific, social and economic developments of this period, began to have ever greater impact. In place of the older classical idealism, a realistic, pragmatic, empirical understanding of life and human behaviour, which recognised human individuality and conscious experience, began to emerge. This was reflected in the novels of Daniel Defoe, Samuel Richardson, and Henry Fielding, who began to write about unique individual lives and experiences lived in realistic, intersubjective (the term is Husserl's), environments. Watt wrote that the novel form's "primary criterion was truth to individual experience". This focus on individual experience characterises the novel in Wattian terms.

A second major trend that Watt studies is the "rise of the reading public" and the growth of professional publishing during this period. Publishers at this time "occupied a strategic position between author and printer, and between both of these and the public". The growth of profit concerns impelled publishers to reach out to a wider reading public. In addition the specialisation of professions, which narrowed the everyday experiences of this new reading public, created a market for portrayals of a greater array of different classes, peoples, ages, sexes, etc. (Writing intended for women, and writing by women, is an important trend of 18th century literature.) Such detailed writings of the experiences of different people can be seen in the novels Watt examines, and had rarely been seen before. Watt presents many statistical details in this section of the book in support of his argument.

== Impact and significance ==
His The Rise of the Novel: Studies in Defoe, Richardson and Fielding (1957) is an important work in the history of academic literary criticism. The Rise of the Novel is considered by many contemporary literary scholars as the seminal work on the origins of the novel, and an important study of literary realism. The book traces the rise of the modern novel to philosophical, economic and social trends and conditions that become prominent in the early 18th century. He is the subject of an intellectual biography by Marina MacKay, Ian Watt: The Novel and the Wartime Critic (2018).

== Works by Watt ==
- The Rise of the Novel
- Myths of Modern Individualism: Faust, Don Quixote, Don Juan, Robinson Crusoe
- Essays on Conrad
- Essays on The Social Function Of Literature
- Conrad's "Secret Agent" (Casebook)
- Conrad in the Nineteenth Century
- Conrad: Nostromo [Landmarks of World Literature]
- Jane Austen, ed. (20th Century Views)
- The Victorian Novel: Modern Essays in Criticism, ed.
- The humanities on the River Kwai (The Grace A. Tanner Lecture in human values)
- Conrad criticism and The Nigger of the 'Narcissus'
- The Literal Imagination: selected essays

=== Editor and with others ===
- Introduction to The Secret Sharer: An Episode from the Coast by Joseph Conrad
- The Literal Imagination: Selected Essays by Ian P. Watt, edited by Bruce Thompson
- The Consequences of Literacy (with Jack Goody)
- Editor: The Life and Opinions of Tristram Shandy, Gentleman by Laurence Sterne
