= Robert Escarpit =

French academic, writer and journalist

- Born: 24 April 1918; Saint-Macaire, France
- Died: 19 November 2000 (aged 82); Langon, France
- Known for: satiric articles

Academic work
- Discipline: English literature communication science
- Institutions: Faculty of Arts of Bordeaux

Robert Escarpit (24 April 1918 in Saint-Macaire – 19 November 2000 in Langon) was a French academic, writer and journalist. He is most known to the public for his satiric articles in newspapers such as Le Monde in which he wrote around twenty columns per month from 1949 to 1979.

== Life ==
=== Youth ===
Escarpit spent his childhood and adolescence in Gironde. At the age of eighteen (1936), he chose to study English, more by necessity and interest as he wanted to continue his studies. He finished his associate, graduate, and postgraduate studies ending with a "Doctor of Literature" degree. He worked as a high-school teacher in Arcachon ( Gironde ) from 1943 to 1945. As a specialist in English literature, he is the author of some fifty books between fiction and sociological essays and novels .

=== Journalist ===
Escarpit became known for his satirical short stories in Le Monde and as a literary critic for many magazines, columnist of Le Matin in 1983, then Sud-Ouest.

=== Professor and sociologist ===
After World War II, he was Secretary General and Director of the French Institute of Latin America in Mexico. Later he was an assistant professor of English and professor of comparative literature at the Faculty of Arts of Bordeaux (1951–1970), and founder of the Sociology Center of Literature which opened in 1960 (later Institute of Literature and Art of Mass Techniques) .

Escarpit served as the scientific director of the "International Dictionary of Literary Terms" Project (DITL V.2), ongoing project funded by the International Comparative Literature Association continued from 1988 by Jean-Marie Grassin.

=== Communication science ===
In his own words: "To measure the stakes of writing, one must understand what reading is, how to receive the text message. This is a strictly scientific approach." He published articles in the journal of the University of Belgrade, Filološki pregled, in 1963. His book The sociology of literature (French: La sociologie de la littérature) published in French in 1958, was translated into 23 languages.

In 1965, he wrote, at the request of UNESCO, The Revolution of the book (French: La révolution du livre). The book, translated into 20 languages, analyzes the phenomenon of the mass-market paperback book and the consequences of the arrival in the world of inexpensive books. He found that the book-problem must be studied as a problem of communication through writing. So, immersed in literature of "communicology", he became one of the first scholars to introduce and promote in France the science of communication.

=== Career and recognition of CIS ===
In 1960, he founded the "Centre for Sociology of Literary Facts" which became in 1965 the "Institute of Literature and Art Mass Techniques", and in 1978 "Science Lab for Information and Communication" (French: Laboratoire des Sciences de L’information et de la Communication). This center would be recognized as the engine of the "School of Bordeaux," a leader in this discipline.

In 1967, he was commissioned to create the "School of Bordeaux", which focused on social and socio-cultural entertainment, being the director of it from 1970 to 1975.

In 1972, in co-operation with other writers, researchers, and academics, including Jean Meyriat and Roland Barthes, he created a pressure group whose aim is to obtain academic recognition for Information and Communication Sciences.

This leads to the creation of an Information Science and Communication Committee, which became the French Society of Information Science and Communication (SFSIC).

Escarpit became president of the University of Bordeaux, and Professor of Information Sciences and Communication between 1975 and 1978.

=== His research and his theory of information science and communication ===
In 1976, he was a pioneer, at least in France, coming out with the "General Theory of Information Sciences and Communication". This study, which presents an overview of information science and communication for today remains an essential book for anyone interested in this field of science. It affirms the need to account for both phenomena of the information, so the documentation in general and those relating to communication.

As he himself says: "For me, the information is the content of the communication, and the communication is the vehicle of information".

=== Political commitment ===
Robert Escarpit was an activist in the SFIO (Section française de l'Internationale ouvrière) at the time of the Popular Front. Engaged in the French Resistance, he participated in 1945 in the fighting of the Médoc with the Carnot Brigrade. He was the editor of the Le Canard enchaîné during the Algerian war of independence. Follower of the French Communist Party (PCF), Robert Escarpit eventually became member of the Aquitaine Regional Council (1986–1992) and councilor on the PCF lists.

Escarpit was the co-founder of the "Franco-Albanian Friendship Society", director of Albanie (Albania) newspaper, and supported Communism in Albania. In March 1990, he published in the daily Le Monde' his vision for the future of back then communist countries in relation to Perestroika. Comparing the communist parties to useful churches to hear a different voice, but victims of their bureaucratic functioning and device preservation strategies, he quoted Ramiz Alia, successor of Enver Hoxha at the head of the Albanian Labor Party in September 1989 which reaffirmed that "...The debate and confrontation of ideas, solutions, alternatives, practices are quite normal".

=== Writer ===
Escarpit received in 1960 the "Peinture fraîche" prize. He has published several novels, including the Young Man and Night (Jeune Homme et la nuit) (1980), and A beautiful day to die (Un si beau jour pour mourir) (1992).

In 1964, he published one of his most famous novels, the Littératron. Ministricule followed after the 1968 government changes, and it makes fun of politicians and businessmen.

In the 1980s, he wrote children's books which he illustrated himself, included in the series Rouletabosse. He then wrote the trilogy of Travels of Azembat, seaman of Biscay (French: Voyages d'Azembat, marin de Gascogne).

In 1953, and with the agreement of Jean Bruel, founding director of the Bateau Mouche of Paris, Robert Escarpit wrote a biography of the fictional Jean-Sébastien Mouche, where he is both the collaborator of Georges-Eugène Haussmann, the inventor of riverboats, and the creator of a police inspectorate specialized in intelligence, the "cookies". A reception in honor of the centenary of Jean-Sébastien Mouche saw even the presence of a minister.

== Publications ==
- Sociology of literature (Sociologie de la littérature), Paris, Presses Universitaires de France, 1958.
- Humour (L’Humour), Paris, Presses Universitaires de France, 1960 [10th edition: 1994]
- The Revolution of the book (La Révolution du livre), Paris, Unesco, 1965. [ 2 e edition revised and updated: Unesco, 1969]
- Literary and social: elements for a sociology of literature (Le Littéraire et le social : éléments pour une sociologie de la littérature), ed. Robert Escarpit. Paris, Flammarion, 1970 New edition: Flammarion, 1977. (Champs 5. sociological field)
- Call me Therese (Appelez-moi Thérèse), Paris, Flammarion, 1975.
- The French Book: 1972 International Book Year, a balance sheet (Le Livre français : 1972, année internationale du livre, un bilan), prepared under the direction of Julien Cain, Robert Escarpit, Henri-Jean Martin. Paris, Government Printing Office, 1972.
- The Written and communication (L’Écrit et la communication), Paris, Presses Universitaires de France, 1973. [4th edition: 1983].
- The Book yesterday, today, tomorrow (Le Livre, hier, aujourd’hui, demain), Paris, R. Laffont; Lausanne, Grammont, 1975. (Library Laffont major theme; 37) [Contains the text of an interview with Robert Escarpit].
- General information theory and communication (Théorie générale de l’information et de la communication), Paris, Hachette, 1976. [New edition under the title: Information and communication: general theory, Hachette, 1991. (Hachette Communication University.)].
- Theory of political and practical information(Théorie de l’information et pratique politique), Paris, Seuil, 1981.
- White Paper on communication (Livre blanc de la communication), Talence, LASIC 1982.

== Bibliography ==
- Marie-France Blanquet, Robert Escarpit, SavoirsCDI, April 2008.
- Jean Meyriat, Robert Escarpit, La Documentation et les sciences de l’Inforcom, Documentaliste - Sciences de l’information, 2000, vol. 37, no.5-6, p.|326-328.
- Jean Devèze et Anne-Marie Laulan, Interview de Robert Escarpit en 1992, publié par la SFSIC.
- Jean Devèze, La Disparition d'un maître fondateur, Hermès (CNRS), 2001.
- Anne-Marie Laulan, Autour de Robert Escarpit : l'effervescence bordelaise (1960-1972), Paris, Hermès (CNRS), 2007.
- Actes de la journée d'hommage à Robert Escarpit du 23 octobre 1998, Communication et Organisation, (ISIC-GRECO Université de Bordeaux 3), hors-série, s.2e, semestre 2000.
- Nicole Robine, Hommage à Robert Escarpit, universitaire, écrivain, journaliste, Bordeaux, PUB, 2001.
