= Zhang Zhuo =

Chinese writer

Zhang Zhuo (traditional Chinese: 張鷟; simplified Chinese: 张𬸦; ca. 658 – ca. 730), courtesy name Zhang Wencheng (張文成), style Fuxiuzi (浮休子), was a Chinese writer of the Tang period. He was from Shenzhou (深州; modern Shenxian 深縣, Hebei province).

Zhang Zhuo is known as the author of the Chaoye qianzai (朝野僉載; "Record of all Matters relating to the Court and abroad"), a collection of stories written in the "brush-notes" (biji 筆記) style. He also authored the encyclopaedia Longjin fengsui pan (龍筋鳳髓判), and the prose narrative work You xianku (游仙窟), a noted work of chuanqi that is considered a prototype of Chinese and East Asian extended work of prose fiction.

== Works (in selection) ==
The Hanyu da zidian f.e. is using his works in the following editions:

- Chaoye qianzai 朝野佥载 (Baoyantang mijitang 宝颜堂秘笈)
- Longjin fengsui pan 龙筋凤髓判 (Huhailou congshu 湖海楼丛书)
- You xianku 游仙窟 (photographic reproduction of the Beixin shuju 北新书局 edition 1929 by the publisher Shanghai guji chubanshe 上海古籍出版社 1985)

== Bibliography ==
- Levy, Howard S.: China’s First Novellette: The Dwelling of Playful Goddesses by Chang Wen-ch’eng (ca. 657-730). Tokyo: Dai Nippon Insatsu, 1965
- Li Xueqin, Lü Wenyu, eds.: Siku da cidian 四庫大辭典, 2 vols. Jilin daxue chubanshe, Changchun 1996
