= Styles and themes of Jane Austen =

Academic analyses of Jane Austen's published works

Jane Austen's (1775–1817) distinctive literary style relies on a combination of parody, burlesque, irony, free indirect speech and a degree of realism. She uses parody and burlesque for comic effect and to critique the portrayal of women in 18th-century sentimental and Gothic novels. Austen extends her critique by highlighting social hypocrisy through irony; she often creates an ironic tone through free indirect speech in which the thoughts and words of the characters mix with the voice of the narrator. The degree to which critics believe Austen's characters have psychological depth informs their views regarding her realism. While some scholars argue that Austen falls into a tradition of realism because of her finely executed portrayal of individual characters and her emphasis on "the everyday", others contend that her characters lack a depth of feeling compared with earlier works, and that this, combined with Austen's polemical tone, places her outside the realist tradition.

Often characterized as "country house novels" or "comedies of manners", Austen's novels also include fairy tale elements. They have less narrative or scenic description and much more dialogue than other early 19th-century novels. Austen shapes a distinctive and subtly constructed voice for each character.

Her plots are fundamentally about education; her heroines come to see themselves and their conduct more clearly, and become better, more moral people. While Austen steers clear of the formal moralizing common in early-19th-century literature, morality—characterized by manners, duty to society and religious seriousness—is a central theme of her works. Throughout her novels, serious reading is associated with intellectual and moral development. The extent to which the novels reflect feminist themes has been extensively debated by scholars; most critics agree that the novels highlight how some female characters take charge of their own worlds, while others are confined, physically and spiritually. Almost all Austen's works explore the precarious economic situation in which women of the late-18th and early-19th centuries found themselves.

Austen's novels have variously been described as politically conservative and progressive. For example, one strand of criticism claims that her heroines support the existing social structure through their dedication to duty and sacrifice of their personal desires. Another argues that Austen is sceptical of the paternalistic ruling "other", evidenced by her ironic tone. Within her exploration of the political issues surrounding the gentry, Austen addresses issues relating to money and property, particularly the arbitrary quality of property inheritance and the precarious economic position of women. Throughout her work there is a tension between the claims of society and the claims of the individual. Austen is often considered one of the originators of the modern, interiorized novel character.

== Styles ==
=== Parody and burlesque ===
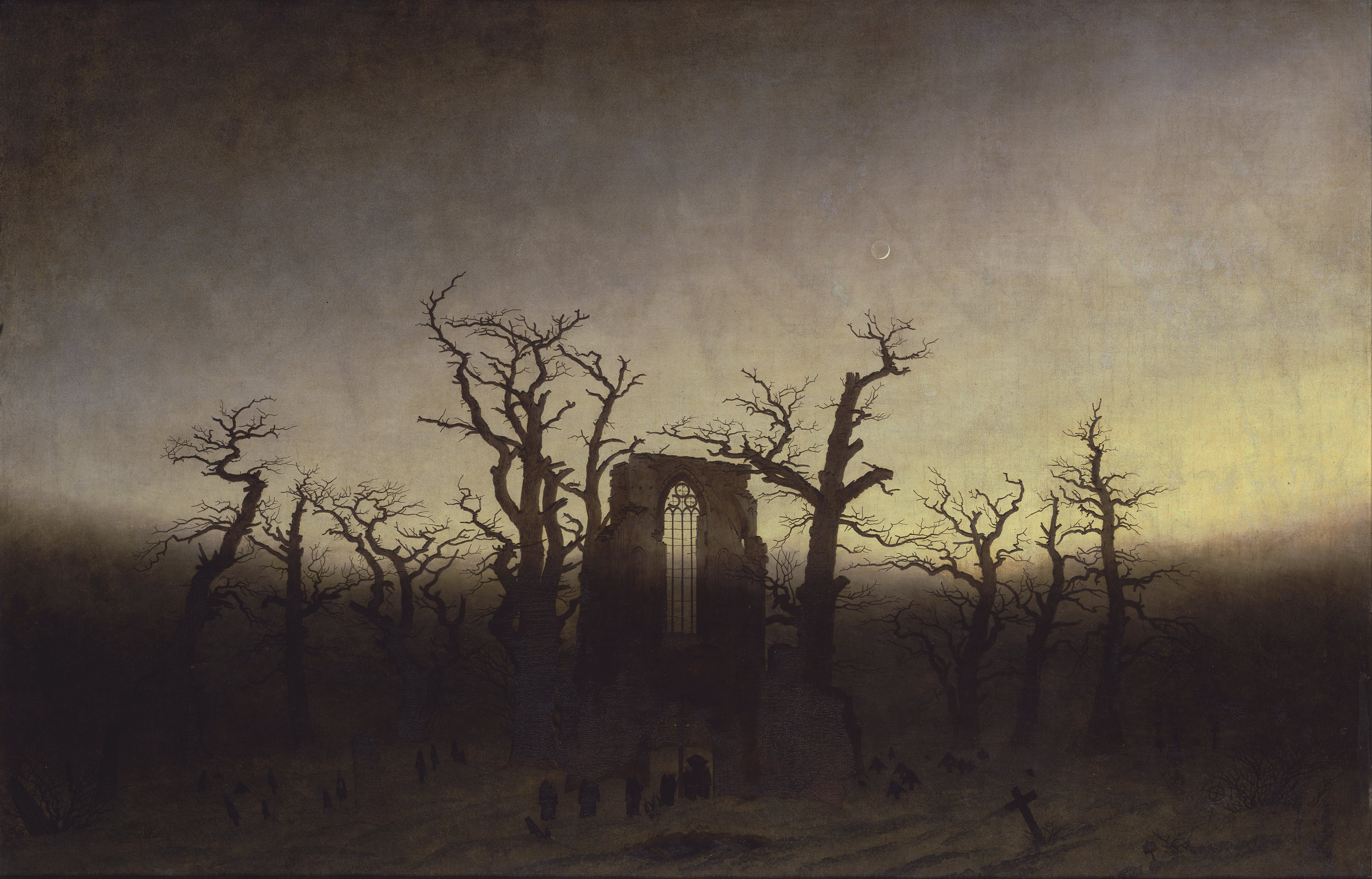
In Northanger Abbey, Austen parodies the Gothic literary style popular during the 1790s.

Austen's juvenile writings are parodies and burlesques of popular 18th-century genres, such as the sentimental novel. She humorously demonstrates that the reversals of social convention common in sentimental novels, such as contempt for parental guidance, are ridiculously impractical; her characters "are dead to all common sense". Her interest in these comedic styles, influenced in part by the writings of novelist Frances Burney and playwrights Richard Brinsley Sheridan and David Garrick, continued less overtly throughout her professional career.

Austen's burlesque is characterized by its mocking imitation and its exaggerated, displaced emphasis. For example, in Northanger Abbey, she ridicules the plot improbabilities and rigid conventions of the Gothic novel. However, she does not categorically reject the Gothic. As Austen scholar Claudia Johnson argues, Austen pokes fun at the "stock gothic machinery—storms, cabinets, curtains, manuscripts—with blithe amusement", but she takes the threat of the tyrannical father seriously. Austen uses parody and burlesque not only for comedic effect, but also, according to feminist critics, to reveal how both sentimental and Gothic novels warped the lives of women who attempted to live out the roles depicted in them. As Susan Gubar and Sandra Gilbert explain in their seminal work, The Madwoman in the Attic (1979), Austen makes fun of "such novelistic clichés as love at first sight, the primacy of passion over all other emotions and/or duties, the chivalric exploits of the hero, the vulnerable sensitivity of the heroine, the lovers' proclaimed indifference to financial considerations, and the cruel crudity of parents".

=== Irony ===
"She [Lady Bertram] was a woman who spent her days in sitting, nicely dressed, on a sofa, doing some long piece of needlework, of little use and no beauty, thinking more of her pug than her children, but very indulgent to the latter when it did not put herself to inconvenience ..."

— Jane Austen, Mansfield Park (1814)

Irony is one of Austen's most characteristic and most discussed literary techniques. She contrasts the plain meaning of a statement with the comic, undermining the meaning of the original to create ironic disjunctions. In her juvenile works, she relies upon satire, parody and irony based on incongruity. Her mature novels employ irony to foreground social hypocrisy.

In particular Austen uses irony to critique the marriage market. Perhaps the most famous example of irony in Austen is the opening line of Pride and Prejudice: "It is a truth universally acknowledged, that a single man in possession of a good fortune, must be in want of a wife." At first glance, the sentence is straightforward and plausible, but the plot of the novel contradicts it: it is women without fortunes who need husbands and seek them out. By the end of the novel, the truth of the statement is acknowledged only by a single character, Mrs. Bennet, a mother seeking husbands for her daughters.

Austen's irony goes beyond the sentence level. As Austen scholar Jan Fergus explains, "the major structural device in Pride and Prejudice is the creation of ironies within the novel's action which, like parallels and contrasts, challenge the reader's attention and judgment throughout, and in the end also engage his feelings." Austen's irony illuminates the foibles of individual characters and her society. In her later novels, in particular, she turns her irony "against the errors of law, manners and customs, in failing to recognize women as the accountable beings they are, or ought to be".

=== Free indirect speech ===
Austen is most renowned for her development of free indirect speech, a technique pioneered by 18th-century novelists Henry Fielding and Frances Burney. In free indirect speech, the thoughts and speech of the characters mix with the voice of the narrator. Austen uses it to provide summaries of conversations or to compress, dramatically or ironically, a character's speech and thoughts. In Sense and Sensibility, Austen experiments extensively for the first time with this technique. For example,

Mrs John Dashwood did not at all approve of what her husband intended to do for his sisters. To take three thousand pounds from the fortune of their dear little boy, would be impoverishing him to the most dreadful degree. She begged him to think again on the subject. How could he answer it to himself to rob his child, and his only child too, of so large a sum?

As Austen scholar Norman Page explains, "the first sentence is straight narrative, in the 'voice' of the [narrator]; the third sentence is normal indirect speech; but the second and fourth are what is usually described as free indirect speech." In these two sentences, Austen represents the inner thoughts of the character and creates the illusion that the reader is entering the character's mind. She often uses indirect speech for background characters. However, Page writes that "for Jane Austen ... the supreme virtue of free indirect speech ... [is] that it offers the possibility of achieving something of the vividness of speech without the appearance for a moment of a total silencing of the authorial voice."

=== Conversation and language ===
"Then," observed Elizabeth, "you must comprehend a great deal in your idea of an accomplished woman."

"Yes, I do comprehend a great deal in it."

"Oh! certainly," cried his [Darcy's] faithful assistant [Miss Bingley], "no one can be really esteemed accomplished who does not greatly surpass what is usually met with. A woman must have a thorough knowledge of music, singing, drawing, dancing, and the modern languages, to deserve the word; and besides all this, she must possess a certain something in her air and manner of walking, the tone of her voice, her address and expressions, or the word will be but half-deserved."

"All this she must possess," added Darcy, "and to all this she must yet add something more substantial, in the improvement of her mind by extensive reading."

"I am no longer surprised at your knowing only six accomplished women. I rather wonder now at your knowing any."

— Jane Austen, Pride and Prejudice (1813)

Compared to other early 19th-century novels, Austen's have little narrative or scenic description—they contain much more dialogue, whether spoken between characters, written as free indirect speech, or represented through letters. For example, in Pride and Prejudice, which began as an epistolary novel, letters play a decisive role in the protagonist's education and the opening chapters are theatrical in tone. Austen's conversations contain many short sentences, question and answer pairs, and rapid exchanges between characters, most memorable perhaps in the witty repartee between Elizabeth and Darcy. This has made Austen's fiction popular in quoted snippets and in books of quotation.

Austen grants each of her characters a distinctive and subtly constructed voice: they are carefully distinguished by their speech. For example, Admiral Croft is marked by his naval slang in Persuasion and Mr. Woodhouse is marked by his hypochondriacal language in Emma. However, it is the misuse of language that most distinguishes Austen's characters. As Page explains, in Sense and Sensibility, for example, the inability of characters such as Lucy Steele to use language properly is a mark of their "moral confusion". (Note: Other examples include Mary Crawford in Mansfield Park and Mrs. Elton in Emma.) In Catharine, or the Bower, Camilla can only speak in fashionable stock phrases which convey no meaning. She is unable to express real feeling, since all of her emotions are mediated through empty hyperbole. Austen uses conversations about literature in particular to establish an implicit moral frame of reference. In Catharine, or the Bower, for example, Catharine makes moral judgments about Camilla based on her superficial and conventional comments about literature.

=== Realism ===
The extent to which Austen's novels are realistic is vigorously debated by scholars. The lack of physical description in her novels lends them an air of unreality. In Austen novels, as Page notes, there is a "conspicuous absence of words referring to physical perception, the world of shape and colour and sensuous response". Yet, Austen carefully researched the background of her novels, using almanacs and read books to accurately describe the chronology and geography of her fictional worlds. Alastair Duckworth argues that she displays "a concern that the novelist should describe things that are really there, that imagination should be limited to an existing order." Austen's prose also repeatedly contains "a relatively small number of frequently-used words, mainly epithets and abstract nouns indicating personal qualities—qualities, that is, of character and temperament rather than outward appearance". This allows readers to feel as if they know the characters "intimately as a mind". Many scholars view this connection between the reader and character as a mark of realism. For example, Janet Todd writes that "Austen creates an illusion of realism in her texts, partly through readerly identification with the characters and partly through rounded characters, who have a history and a memory." However, there is little agreement regarding the depth of Austen's characters. Butler has argued that Austen is not primarily a realist writer because she is not interested in portraying the psychology of her heroines. Seeing Austen as a polemicist against sensibility, Butler argues that she avoided "the sensuous, the irrational, [and] the involuntary types of mental experience because, although she cannot deny their existence, she disapproves of them."

At the time Austen was writing, the historical novels of Walter Scott and early realist novels of Maria Edgeworth had already initiated the realist tradition. Austen's novels are sometimes seen as an outgrowth of these new genres. In an early review of Emma, Scott himself praised Austen's ability to copy "from nature as she really exists in the common walks of life, and presenting to the reader ... a correct and striking representation of that which is daily taking place around him". However, as Austen scholar William Galperin has argued, Austen could not have participated in 19th-century realism—the realism with which she later became associated—because it had not yet been fully defined. He argues Austen's novels were part of the beginning phases of realism. Therefore, instead of seeing Austen as a realist writer, he sees her as a picturesque writer on the cusp of realism. Her attention to detail, probability, and oppositionality, lead him to call her the "historian of the everyday".

John Wiltshire argues that Austen's works may also be distinguished from the realist tradition in their treatment of illness and health. In the realist tradition, good health is taken for granted, as part of the invisible background, and characters who are ill, or injured, or deformed, become prominently visible for that reason. In Austen's works, the issue of health is in the foreground—Emma's good health, Mr. Woodhouse's hypochondria, Fanny Price's "physical insecurity." Health (good or bad) is an important part of the characterization of many of Austen's principal characters, and beginning with Mansfield Park becomes a crucial element in the unfolding of her plots. For a woman, health is a commodity, making her more or less appealing to the patriarchal male gaze (e.g. Marianne is more "marketable" after her illness).

=== Genre ===
Jane Austen famously wrote to her nephew James Edward Austen that his "strong, manly, spirited Sketches, full of Variety and Glow" would not fit on "the little bit (two Inches wide) of Ivory on which I work with so fine a Brush, as produces little effect after much labour." Austen novels have often been characterized as "country house novels" or as "comedies of manners". Comedies of manners are concerned "with the relations and intrigues of gentlemen and ladies living in a polished and sophisticated society" and the comedy is the result of "violations of social conventions and decorum, and relies for its effect in great part on the wit and sparkle of the dialogue." However, Austen's novels also have important fairy tale elements to them. Pride and Prejudice follows the traditional Cinderella plot while "Persuasion rewrites the Cinderella narrative, as it shifts the fairy tale's emphasis from the heroine's transformation into a beauty to the prince's second look at her face." However, Fanny, in Mansfield Park, rejects the Prince Charming character and at least one scholar has suggested that in this Austen is signalling "a general attack on the dangers of 'fiction'".

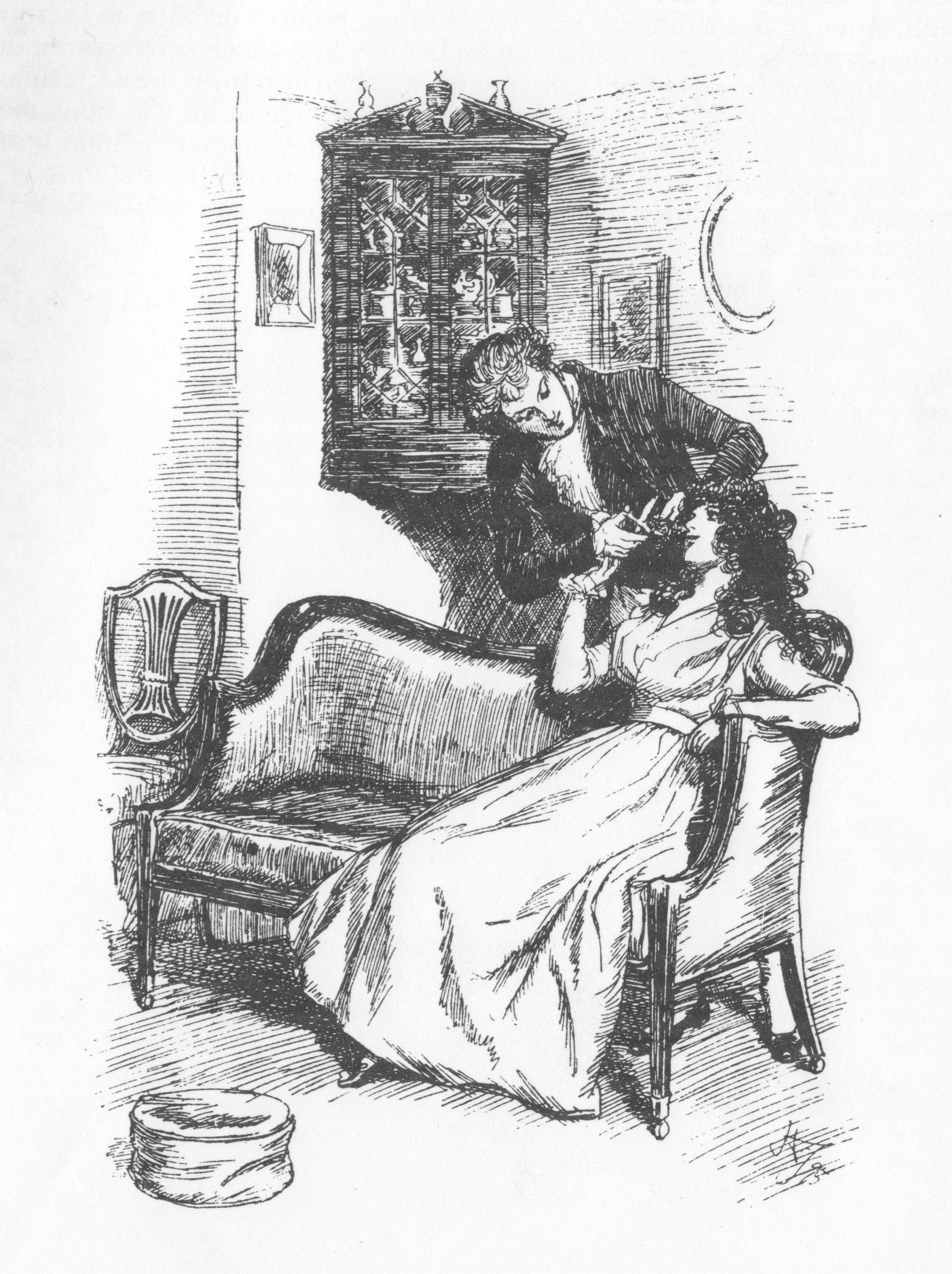
Willoughby cutting off a lock of Marianne's hair in Sense and Sensibility

Austen's novels can easily be situated within the 18th-century novel tradition. Austen, like the rest of her family, was a great novel reader. Her letters contain many allusions to contemporary fiction, often to such small details as to show that she was thoroughly familiar with what she read. Austen read and reread novels, even minor ones. She read widely within the genre, including many works considered mediocre both then and now, but tended to emphasize domestic fiction by women writers, and her own novels contain many references to these works. For example, the phrase "pride and prejudice" comes from Burney's Cecilia, and the Wickham subplot in Pride and Prejudice is a parody of Henry Fielding's Tom Jones.

Austen's early works are often structured around a pair of characters. For example, Sense and Sensibility is a didactic novel based on the contrast between the beliefs and conduct of two heroines, a novel format that was particularly fashionable in the 1790s and exemplified by Edgeworth's Letters of Julia and Caroline and Elizabeth Inchbald's Nature and Art. Because circulating libraries often used catalogues that only listed a novel's name, Austen chose titles that would have resonance for her readers; abstract comparisons like "sense and sensibility" were part of a moralistic tradition and eponymous heroine names were part of a new romantic novel tradition. Elinor, representing "sense", and Marianne, representing "sensibility", articulate a contrast "between two modes of perception", according to Butler. "Marianne's way is subjective, intuitive, implying confidence in the natural goodness of human nature when untrammelled by convention. Her view is corrected by the more cautious orthodoxy of Elinor, who mistrusts her own desires, and requires even her reason to seek the support of objective evidence." (Note: Pride and Prejudice can be seen as a contrast between Elizabeth and Darcy and between the two couples, Elizabeth and Darcy and Jane and Bingley.) However, other critics have argued that the contrast between the two characters is not a strict binary. For example, Marianne reasonably discusses propriety and Elinor passionately loves Edward.

Between 1760 and 1820, conduct books reached the height of their popularity in Britain; one scholar refers to the period as "the age of courtesy books for women". Conduct books integrated the styles and rhetorics of earlier genres, such as devotional writings, marriage manuals, recipe books, and works on household economy. They offered their readers a description of (most often) the ideal woman while at the same time handing out practical advice. Thus, not only did they dictate morality, but they also guided readers' choice of dress and outlined "proper" etiquette. Austen's fiction built on and questioned the assumptions of this tradition, reacting against conduct book writers such as Hannah More, John Gregory, and Hester Chapone. Beginning with the juvenilia, as early as Catharine, or the Bower, Austen viewed this genre as thoroughly mindless and irrelevant to social realities.

== Themes ==
=== Education and reading ===
"I will not adopt that ungenerous and impolitic custom so common with novel writers, of degrading by their contemptuous censure the very performances, to the number of which they are themselves adding—joining with their greatest enemies in bestowing the harshest epithets on such works, and scarcely ever permitting them to be read by their own heroine, who, if she accidentally take up a novel, is sure to turn over its insipid pages with disgust ... Let us not desert one another; we are an injured body. Although our productions have afforded more extensive and unaffected pleasure than those of any other literary corporation in the world, no species of composition has been so much decried."

— Jane Austen, Northanger Abbey (1817)

Austen's plots are fundamentally about education; her heroines undergo a "process through which they come to see clearly themselves and their conduct" and thereby "become better people". For example, in Pride and Prejudice, Elizabeth goes through a process of error, recognition of error, remorse, and determination to do better. She realizes that she was mistaken about both Wickham and Darcy. In examining her mental processes, it dawns on her that she has never been objective about Darcy. She understands that, apart from her stubbornly maintained feelings of antipathy, she has no objective reason to dislike or reject him:

She grew absolutely ashamed of herself.—Of neither Darcy nor Wickham could she think, without feeling that she had been blind, partial, prejudiced, absurd. 'How despicably have I acted!' she cried.—'I, who have prided myself on my discernment! ... Pleased with the preference of one, and offended by the neglect of the other, on the very beginning of our acquaintance, I have courted prepossession and ignorance, and driven reason away, where either was concerned. Till this moment, I never knew myself.'

Austen's narratives move towards these moments of self-realization, which are the most dramatic and memorable in her novels. (Note: Northanger Abbey is about the education of Catherine; she comes to realize what her own mistakes were: "The visions of romance were over. Catherine was completely awakened." Emma's discovery that she loves Knightley "brings her back to the directness and truth she is capable of when her judgment is clear" and instills in her a new humility and willingness to criticize herself. In Persuasion, Wentworth makes the mistake of abandoning Anne Elliot and then comes to recognize this error, saying "I shut my eyes, and would not understand you, or do you justice.") Austen is also attempting to educate readers, particularly their emotions. For example, in Sense and Sensibility and the later novels she focuses on eliciting judgment and sympathy.

Throughout Austen's novels, reading is associated with intellectual and moral development. Not all reading practices result in "improvement," however. Those characters who read superficially to accumulate knowledge for the purpose of displaying their grasp of culture (such as Mary Bennet in Pride and Prejudice), or of flaunting their social status, do not benefit from this moral growth. The ideal reader is represented in Elizabeth, who revises her opinion of Darcy by rereading his letter and keeping herself open to reinterpretations of it. (Note: The readings habits of the eponymous heroine of Catharine, or the Bower are contrasted with Camilla's. Catharine reads history and literature and cultivates self-control and judgment, while Camilla reads superficially, ending up vain and materialistic.)

=== Morality ===
Morality, characterized by manners, duty to society and religious seriousness, is a central theme of Austen's works. Drawing on the Johnsonian tradition, Austen uses words such as "duty" and "manners" consistently throughout her fiction as signifiers of her ethical system. Manners for Austen are not just etiquette, but also a moral code. According to one important interpretation, Austen can be considered a "conservative Christian moralist" whose view of society was "ultimately founded in religious principle". However, Austen's works are unique among her contemporaries in containing few, if any, references to the Bible. Instead, she often refers to works by moral poets such as William Cowper. Yet other critics have pointed out that Mansfield Park can be seen as a challenge to the conservative novels of the 1790s because the character who most closely adheres to the values of piety, filial obedience and modesty, Fanny, is the one most harmed by the failures of conservative ideology.

Austen feared that economic considerations would overcome moral considerations in human conduct; her most amoral characters—Wickham, Mary Crawford, Mr. Elliot—are the most economically motivated. Moral improvement in her works is not only for the characters but also for the readers. Her novels are intended to "instruct and to refine the emotions along with the perceptions and the moral sense". Believing in a complex moral conscience rather than an innate moral sense, Austen felt that it was necessary to inculcate readers with proper virtues by portraying morally ambiguous characters from which they could learn. Although she and Johnson shared a similar sense of morality, Johnson argued that only one-dimensional characters could instill virtue in readers. Burney and Austen by contrast are both "interested in the emotions which make moral action difficult and in the moral principles which complicate emotions".

=== Religion ===
Critics and commentators have long agreed that Austen was "a conscientious and believing churchwoman." References in her remaining letters suggest to Oliver MacDonagh that Austen was an orthodox Anglican, that she conceived of the Anglican church (in patriotic terms) as national in character, and that she was pleased with "the increasing religiosity and advance in public morality" in England during her lifetime. In 1939, Canon Harold Anson argued that "Austen's novels are religious not because they contain religious controversy or 'a strong ecclesiastical motif' ... but because they show 'the underlying principles upon which men live their lives and by which they judge the characters of others'." According to Gary Kelly, "this has become the dominant view of those critics who find Austen to be a religious novelist.

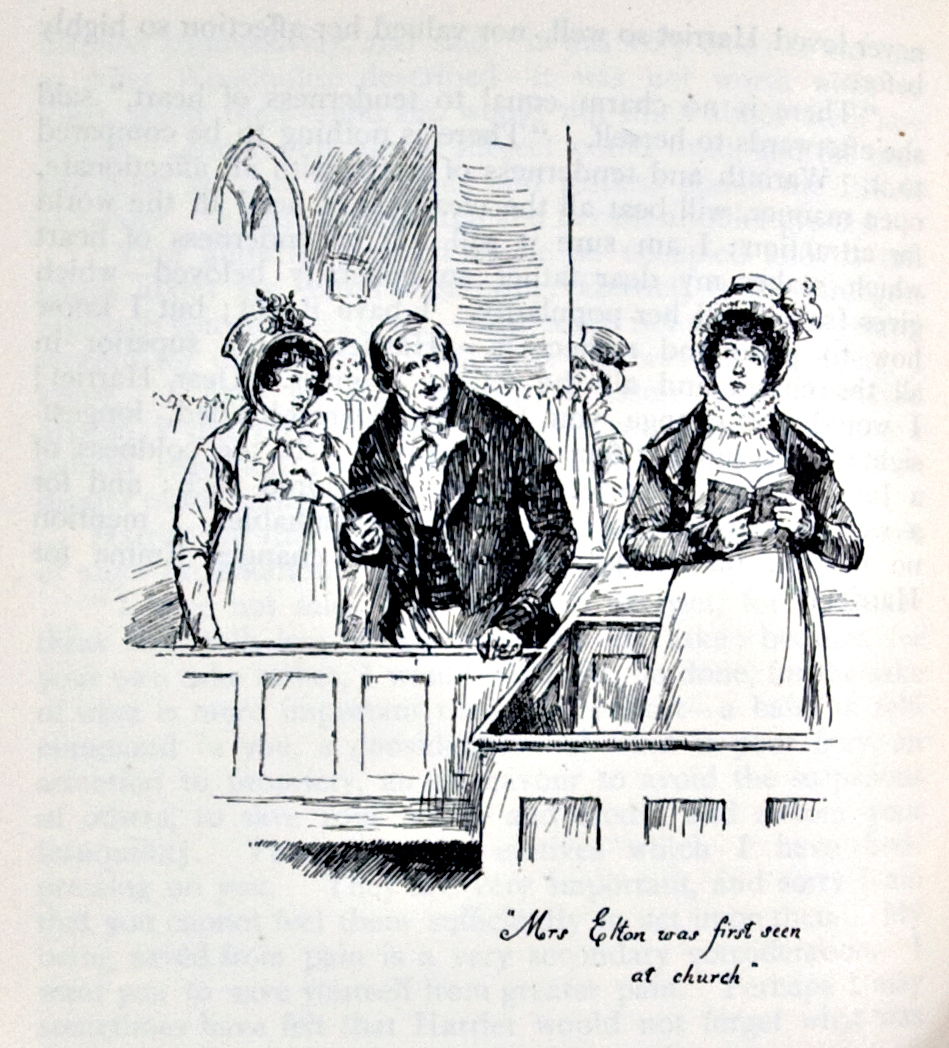
Church was a social as well as a religious event. In Emma, for example, the first time the town sees Mr. Elton's wife is at church. (Chris Hammond, 1898)

Austen's style was heavily influenced by the language of the King James Version of the Bible and, especially, by the Book of Common Prayer, both of which Austen heard spoken every week all of her life as a part of Anglican services. According to Isabel Grundy, "the almost prehistorical authors of the Old Testament have bequeathed her their rapidity and spareness of narrative, the New Testament writers their remarkable ability to enter the common mind and to conjure an illusion of verisimilitude by means of a single detail ... her taste for brief declarative sentences is something she shares with the gospels." However, while Austen's style was heavily influenced by these works, she seems to have decided not to refer in her work directly to the Bible or other sacred works. Doody points out that "she is singular among novelists of her age in her refusal to admit references to the Bible, or to biblical characters, scenes or stories."

Critics are uncertain about Austen's relationship to the rising Evangelical movement within the Anglican church of her day. (Note: The direct evidence of Austen's writings is ambiguous. Austen wrote to her sister, Cassandra, in 1809 in reaction to the publication of Hanna More's popular novel Colebs in Search of a Wife, that "My disinclination for it before was affected, but now it is real; I do not like Evangelicals." By 1814 Austen's attitudes had evidently changed. In a letter to her niece, Fanny Knight, commenting on Fanny's first serious relationship, Austen stated that she was "by no means convinced that we ought not all to be Evangelicals".) In the first two decades of the 19th century, Evangelicalism became effective as a powerful upper-middle class pressure group supporting reform of abuses and opposing vice. According to Butler, whether or not Austen was sympathetic to Evangelical religion, her works reflect society's growing seriousness of tone and desire for reform. Other critics have taken a more decisive stance on Austen's personal views. For example, both MacDonagh and Waldron argue that she personally disliked the movement. Waldron contends that Austen would not have approved of the movement's idealization of behaviour. MacDonagh believes that Austen's letters and other private writings suggest that she became more serious religiously as she became older. Mansfield Park and Persuasion are the novels most often cited as examples of Austen's growing religiosity. For example, Persuasion "is subtly different from the laxer, more permissive social atmosphere of the three novels Jane Austen began before 1800" and contains more frequent references to Providence. In Mansfield Park, Fanny stands for spirituality and proper morality. It is she who most clearly characterizes Henry Crawford's affair with Maria in religious terms, in the language of sin, guilt and punishment. She is portrayed as an earnest, strict and struggling Christian, not perfect but trying hard.

=== Gender ===
==== Feminism ====
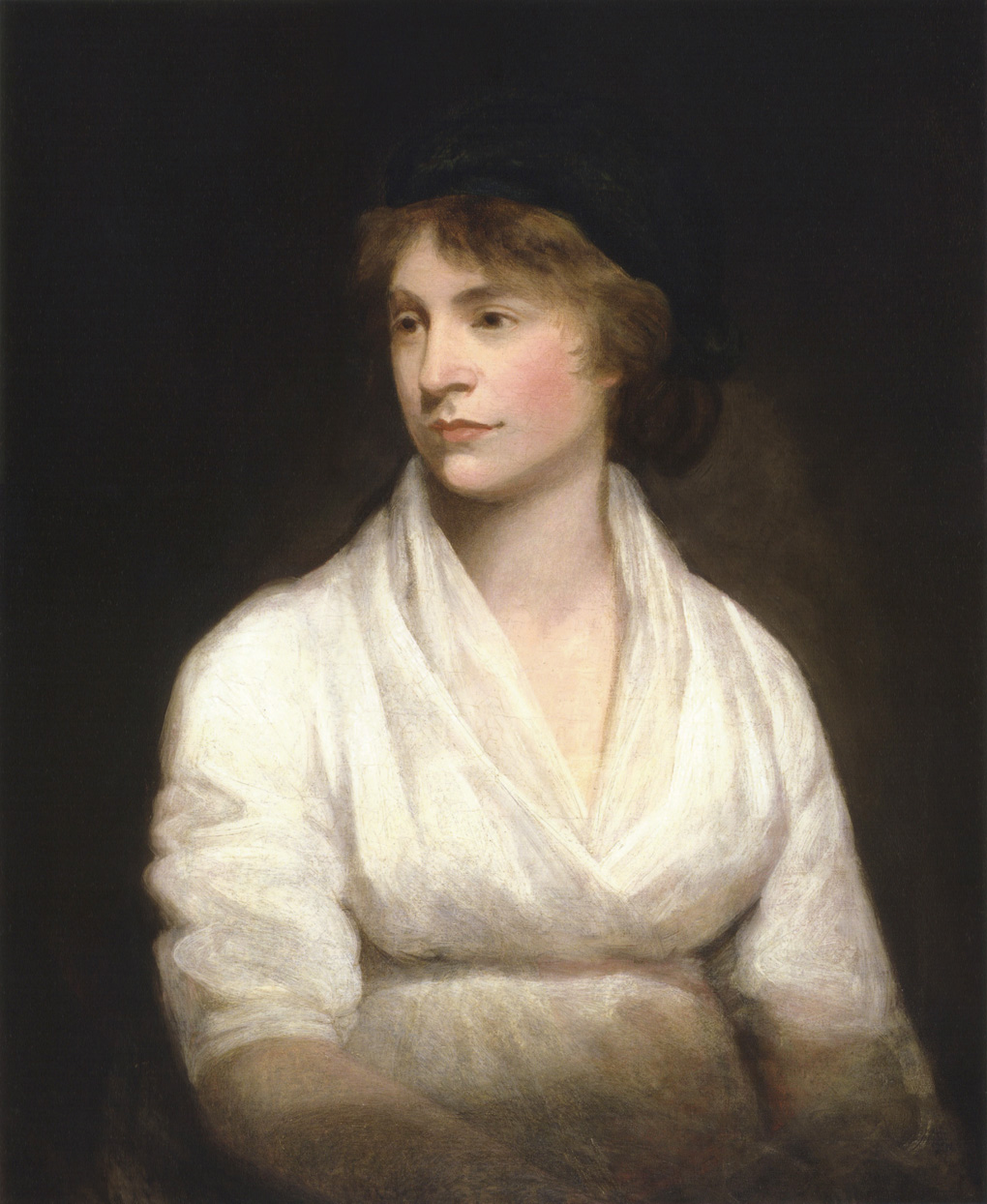
There is intense scholarly debate as to whether Austen's works follow in the tradition of Enlightenment feminists such as Mary Wollstonecraft.

Since the rise of feminist literary criticism in the 1970s, the question of to what extent Austen was a feminist writer has been at the forefront of Austen criticism. Scholars have identified two major strains of 18th-century feminism: "Tory feminism" and "Enlightenment feminism". Austen has been associated with both. Tory feminism, which includes such writers as Mary Astell and Dorothy Wordsworth, is a tradition of thought which recognized that "women were treated as an inferior class in a man's world". Writers in this tradition urged women to counter this discrimination through moral and spiritual self-cultivation and charitable service to the family and community. Butler has argued that Austen belongs to the Tory feminist tradition because of her stylistic and thematic affinity to the writings of Maria Edgeworth. Moreover, Austen's "heroines' subordinate role in the family ... their dutifulness, meditativeness, self-abnegation, and self-control" are characteristics shared by the heroines of conservative authors such as Jane West and Mary Brunton.

Enlightenment feminism, which includes such writers as Catharine Macaulay and Mary Wollstonecraft, is a tradition of thought that claims that "women share the same moral nature as men, ought to share the same moral status, and exercise the same responsibility for their conduct". Margaret Kirkham has argued that Austen is part of this tradition because, for one, her "heroines do not adore or worship their husbands, though they respect and love them. They are not, especially in the later novels, allowed to get married at all until the heroes have provided convincing evidence of appreciating their qualities of mind, and of accepting their power of rational judgement, as well as their good hearts." Anne Elliot, the heroine of Persuasion, is an example of such a protagonist. Kirkham argues that Austen knew and admired the works of Mary Wollstonecraft, particularly A Vindication of the Rights of Woman (1792). Moreover, she and others argue that Austen's novels followed in the tradition of the radical Jacobin novels of the 1790s, which often dealt with feminist issues.

Throughout Austen's fiction, according to feminist critics, female characters comment on male-authored texts and take charge of the creation of their own worlds. In their seminal work The Madwoman in the Attic (1979), noted feminist critics Sandra Gilbert and Susan Gubar argue that the literary world is dominated by men and their stories, and that Austen recognized and critiqued this. The best-known example is from Northanger Abbey, in which the heroine, Catherine, complains that history "tells [her] nothing that does not either vex or weary [her]. The quarrels of popes and kings, with wars or pestilences, in every page; the men all so good for nothing, and hardly any women at all—it is very tiresome". Austen's juvenile parody of Oliver Goldsmith's History of England is "authored" by "a partial, prejudiced, and ignorant Historian". In such statements, Austen suggests that history is a masculine fiction and of little importance to women. Feminist critics also focus on the role of the female artist in Austen's fiction. For example, Claudia Johnson views Emma as a powerful heroine, an artist who controls her home, her marriage choice, her community and her money. Emma composes stories for people's lives and thereby represents the figure of the female artist.

Despite arguing that Austen's novels have feminist elements, scholars have still noted that women are frequently represented as confined in Austen's novels and that there are few depictions of female authority figures. Women are literally confined in small spaces but are constrained even more effectively by social factors such as "miseducation" and "financial dependency". Gilbert and Gubar argue that women "must acquiesce in their own confinement, no matter how stifling" because "they are too vulnerable in the world at large". For example, in Persuasion Anne Elliot describes the differences between men and women: "We live at home, quiet, confined, and our feelings prey upon us. You are forced on exertion. You have always a profession, pursuits, business of some sort or other, to take you back into the world immediately, and continual occupation and change soon weaken impressions." Butler points out that Austen's novels lack depictions of female mentors or authority figures. In the novels, Butler argues, women do not progress from ignorance to knowledge, for example, and many of them are "oddly and even unnaturally ineffective". Instead, they marry authority figures. As Gilbert and Gubar put it, "becoming a woman means relinquishing achievement and accommodating oneself to men and the spaces they provide". For example, in Persuasion, as Mary and Louisa grow up they lose their independence and become reliant on those around them.

==== Economic position of women ====
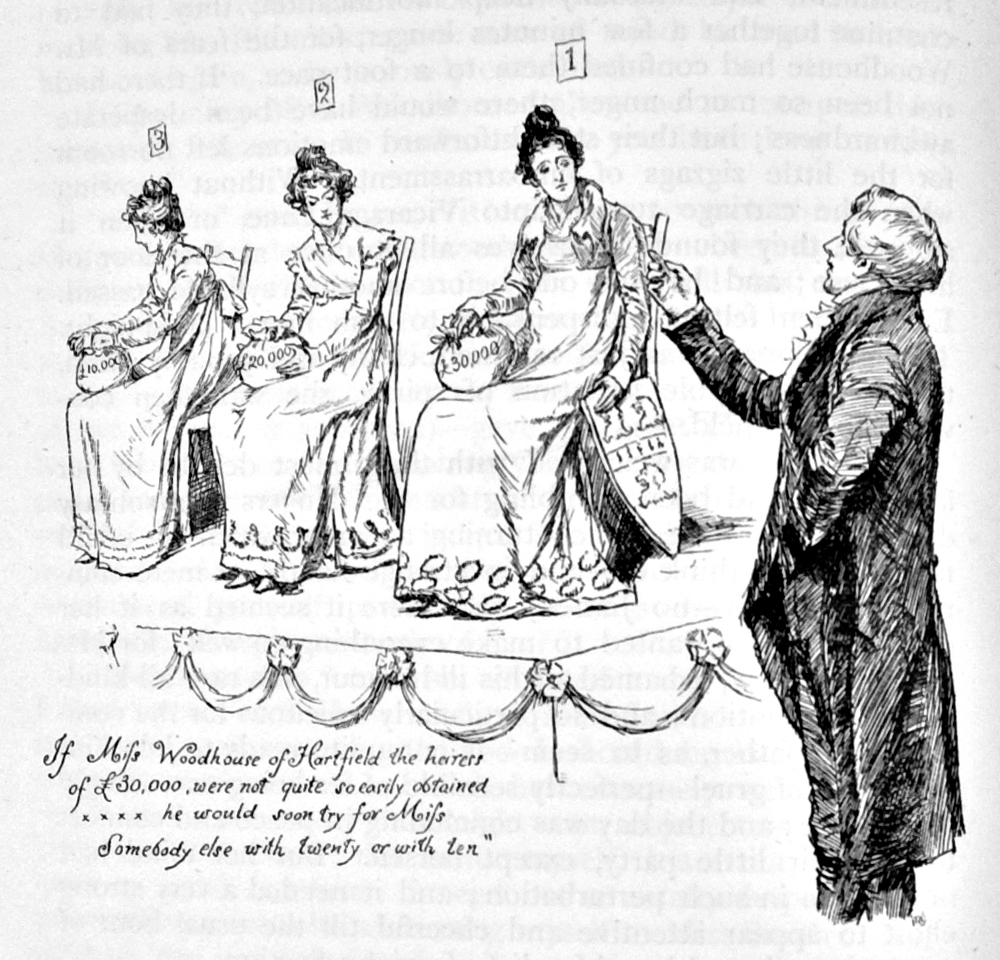
Chris Hammond's illustration, published in 1898, of Mr. Elton's economic considerations of marriage in Emma.

Austen's novels explore the precarious economic position of women of the late-18th and early-19th centuries. As Gilbert and Gubar explain, "Austen examines the female powerlessness that underlies monetary pressure to marry, the injustice of inheritance laws, the ignorance of women denied formal education, the psychological vulnerability of the heiress or widow, the exploited dependency of the spinster, the boredom of the lady provided with no vocation". In exploring these issues, she continued the tradition of Burney's novels, particularly Cecilia (1782) and Camilla (1796).

Worldly marriage is the theme of Austen's unfinished novel, The Watsons, which portrays a female economy in which the odds for marriage heavily favour those young women whose fathers can and will pay a dowry. Physical attractiveness and "accomplishments" are helpful but insufficient in the absence of adequate funds for a marriage settlement. After Mr. Watson dies, the family does not have sufficient money for the dowries or support of the four daughters. As historian Oliver MacDonagh writes, "[m]atrimony was their only hope of escape from current penury and future ruin or near-ruin. Dowerless, they were pursuing it with varying degrees of ruthlessness."

MacDonagh points out that none of the marriages in Austen's fiction of which she approved was financially imprudent. For Austen, marriage and children were a girl's natural and best aspiration. She advocated sincere attachment, material prudence and circumspect delay in the choice of a marriage partner. If the appropriate conditions were met, then marriage should follow. Austen realized that women without independent means felt very great pressure to marry someone who could look after them, because otherwise they would be a burden on their families. The marriage market that she describes is quite detailed and well understood by all concerned. For example, as is explained in Mansfield Park, "Miss Maria Ward, 'with only seven thousand pounds', had the good luck to captivate a baronet, 'her uncle, the lawyer, allowed her to be at least three thousand pounds short of any equitable claim to it'. To indulge in a marriage less lucrative than might have been expected was regarded as 'throwing oneself away', and someone like Mary Crawford, who prided herself on her realism, could not bring herself to do it."

==== Sexuality ====
Austen's depiction of sexuality is muted and indirect. While her depictions of Elizabeth and Darcy in Pride and Prejudice include descriptions of their physical reactions to each other, which was unusual at the time, the climactic moments of this and her other novels are presented from a distance. Moreover, Austen does not turn her irony on sexual experiences. She often refers to the sexual attraction between characters in oblique terms. For example, she writes that Elinor considers the "unaccountable bias in favor of beauty", which caused an intelligent man to choose a silly wife. This "unaccountable bias" represents sexual power, the physical attraction of one body to another, "everything that cannot be said about the relations between men and women".

=== Politics ===
There is no agreement on Austen's political views and it was not until the second half of the 20th century that her novels were viewed as political at all. As Gary Kelly explains:

Some see her as a political "conservative" because she seems to defend the established social order. Others see her as sympathetic to 'radical' politics that challenged the established order, especially in the form of patriarchy ... some critics see Austen's novels as neither conservative nor subversive, but complex, criticizing aspects of the social order but supporting stability and an open class hierarchy.

Marilyn Butler and Alastair Duckworth have made the case for Austen as a conservative writer. Butler argues that one measure of a conservative writer is "whether the plot, broadly, suggests a victim suffering at the hands of society". Butler argues that Austen's novels are so structured, and thus conservative. She divides Austen's works into two kinds: stories involving a "Heroine who is Right" and a spokeswoman for conservative orthodoxy, and stories involving a "Heroine who is Wrong" who must learn from her mistakes by recognizing them and resolving to do better. In the novels in which the "Heroine is Right", the same process of error, self-knowledge and resolve to follow reason is present, but in another principal character or characters. The "Heroine who is Right" helps bring about the change in these other characters. Butler contends that "Austen's stress upon her heroines' subordinate role in a family, upon their dutifulness, meditativeness, self-abnegation and self-control, were codes shared with other conservative writers, especially women moralists such as Jane West and Mary Brunton. The acquiescent heroine challenges the hero or heroine of novels of the 1790s by reformists such as Bage, Godwin, Holcroft, Hays, and Wollstonecraft, who insist on thinking independently and speaking out."

In Sense and Sensibility, for example, Elinor and Marianne represent "the view of the nature-nurture dichotomy usually adopted by conservatives", that is, "on the one hand, Marianne's way is subjective, intuitive, implying confidence in the natural goodness of human nature when untrammelled by convention. Her view is corrected by the more cautious orthodoxy of Elinor, who mistrusts her own desires, and requires even her reason to seek the support of objective evidence." Duckworth argues that Austen's heroines aim "to support and maintain an inherited structure of values and behavior", often with an explicit Christian stoicism. In his interpretation, Austen's heroines' morality is based in religious principle and duty to society. Austen's novels portray "society" positively, and her novels end with hero and heroine united in the company of true friends, society "reaffirmed around the central union, and the social fragmentation that initially threatened ... reconstituted through individual commitment into a new whole."

Scholars such as Claudia Johnson argue that Austen is indebted to the political novels of the 1790s and that she is sceptical of the paternalistic ruling order. For example, Johnson argues that Sense and Sensibility is a critique of primogeniture and the arbitrariness of property inheritance. She contends that the novel is not, as it is often assumed to be, "a dramatized conduct book patly favoring female prudence over female impetuosity". Johnson concludes that Austen created "a progressive middle ground" after the blistering political fights of the 1790s. Kelly agrees, writing that Austen embraced the "hierarchical social structure and constitution of church and state" yet also recognized that they needed reform. Jenkyns supports this view: "What must be said emphatically is that she does not praise the existing state of society." He gives as examples such flawed representatives of the status quo as Sir Walter Elliot, Sir Thomas Bertram and Emma Woodhouse's father; Austen's admiration of the Navy as an avenue of social mobility (the Crofts and Captain Wentworth in Persuasion); and her sympathetic portrayal of characters who are "in trade" or newly risen from it (Bingley and the Gardiners in Pride and Prejudice, the Westons and Frank Churchill in Emma).

=== Role of colonialism ===
"'But I [Fanny] do talk to him [Sir Thomas] more than I used. I am sure I do. Did not you hear me ask him about the slave-trade last night?'

'I [Edmund] did—and was in hopes the question would be followed up by others. It would have pleased your uncle to be inquired further.'

'And I longed to do it—but there was such a dead silence! And while my cousins were sitting by without speaking a word, or seeming at all interested in the subject, I did not like—I thought it would appear as if I wanted to set myself off at their expense, by shewing a curiosity and pleasure in his information which he must wish his own daughters to feel.'"

— Jane Austen, Mansfield Park (1814)

One of the most hotly debated topics in Austen criticism is the role of colonialism in Austen's works. In 1993 Edward Said published Culture and Imperialism, in which he argued that the relationship between the English and the Antigua estates in Mansfield Park represents the relationship between the center and the periphery of the British empire. He argued that "England was surveyed, evaluated, made known, whereas 'abroad' was only referred to or shown briefly without the kind of presence or immediacy lavished on London, the countryside, or northern industrial centers such as Manchester or Birmingham." Specifically, "Thomas Bertram's slave plantation in Antigua is mysteriously necessary to the poise and the beauty of Mansfield Park, a place described in moral and aesthetic terms" but it is rarely mentioned.

In response to Said's argument, several alternative theories were proposed. For example, it was argued that the women of Mansfield Park and the slaves in Antigua were similarly disenfranchised and victimized. Others argue that the crucial opposition is not between a center and a periphery, i.e. Mansfield and Antigua, but rather within Mansfield Park itself, between Sir Thomas and Fanny. In this view, the novel is "an inquiry into Mansfield's corruption that challenges the ethical basis for its authority both at home and, by implication, overseas". Some critics, such as Susan Fraiman, directly challenge Said, arguing that Austen's position as a dispossessed woman gave her an outsider's view of Britain and its empire, arguing that there are anti-imperialist elements in Austen's criticism of provincialiaty.

=== Property and class ===
Austen's novels raise and explore a variety of issues relating to money and property and the power they convey. For example, in Pride and Prejudice, the plot revolves around the problems caused by primogeniture, as the Bennet property is entailed away from the Bennet daughters, and Sense and Sensibility questions the arbitrariness of property inheritance when the elderly Mr. Dashwood disinherits one side of his nephew's family because of his affection for a baby on the other. As Copeland explains, "[f]rom the focus of Sense and Sensibility, Pride and Prejudice, and Northanger Abbey, where the single most significant economic problem for women is the lack of a fortune, Austen's works steadily engage women in more and more complex relationships to the economy. Mansfield Park, Emma, and Persuasion, each in turn, move through an examination of the economy as measure of social morality, as agent of social disruption, [and] as source of national identity".

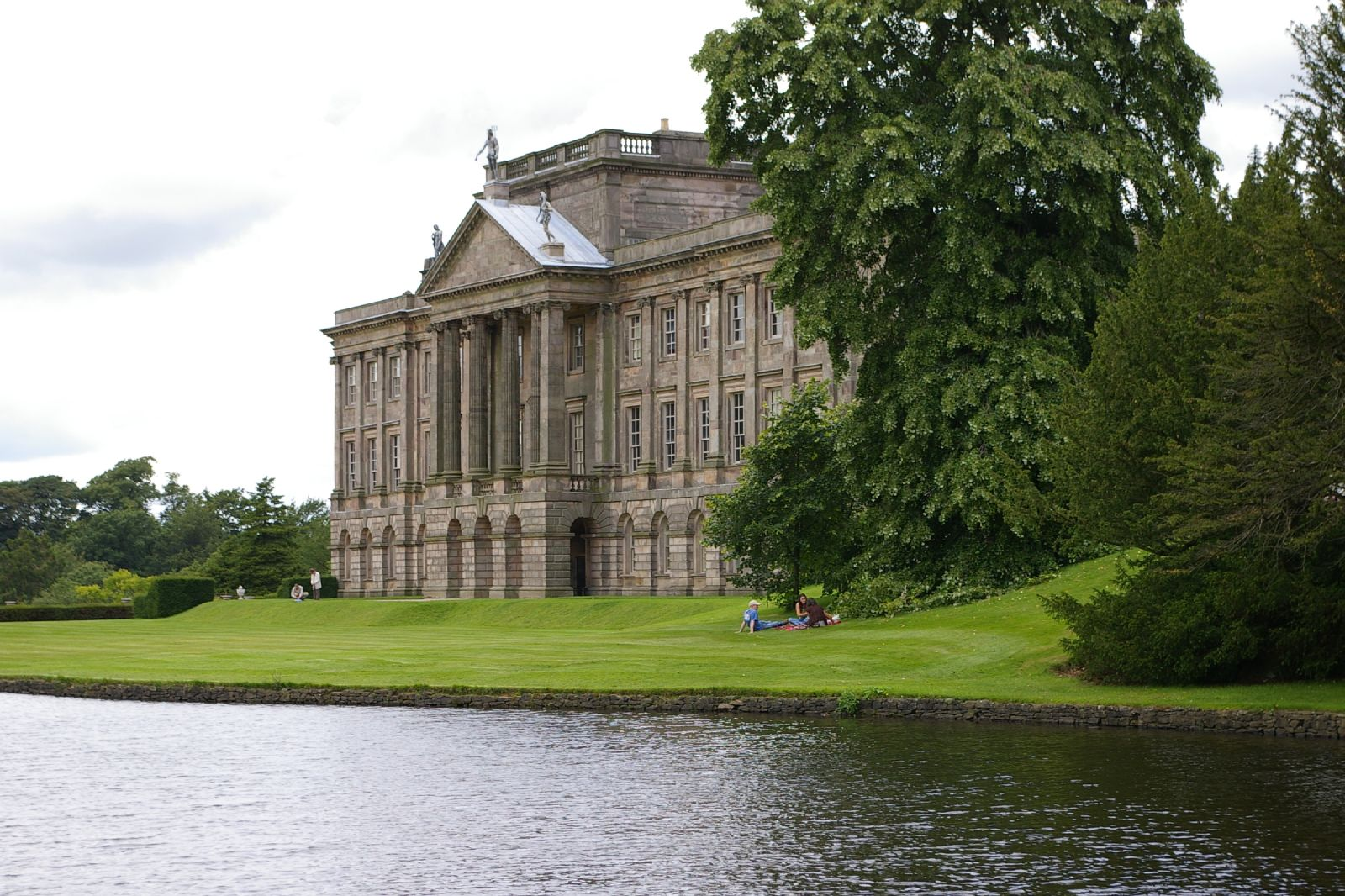
Lyme Hall, part of Lyme Park

The novels discuss social status and social position in terms of "rank", "station" and "degree", and not in terms of "class" in the modern sense. Where the more modern concept of "class" is determined principally by productivity and income, and connotes conflict, the term "rank" focused on lineage and connoted harmony, stability and order. Austen generally portrays characters in the professional classes, such as the clergy and armed forces, most positively. For example, in Mansfield Park, the heroine marries a clergyman, while in Persuasion, the model marriage is that of Admiral and Mrs. Croft. Although Austen's novels suggest that characters should be judged by moral standards and not simply by social status, she always specifies their social positions, often (as with the Gardiners in Pride and Prejudice) making it part of the earliest descriptions of a character. Austen outlines characters' social connections in detail. In Emma the reader is exposed to a wide spectrum of hierarchical society: the gentry, the near-gentry, professionals, artisans, servants and the undeserving poor. While social contact between these groups is frequent in a small village, transition between groups was uncommon. For example, Emma, a member of the gentry, dines with the Coles, "rising" members of the near-gentry, but she marries Knightley, a member of the gentry, who feels free to dine with Robert Martin, one of his tenant farmers.

In his influential analysis of the role of landed estates in Austen's fiction, Duckworth argues that "estates function not only as the settings of action but as indexes to the character and social responsibility of their owners". Landscape improvements appear as an issue in all of the novels, but in Mansfield Park they become a recurring motif, reflecting the social change at the center of the novel. In Pride and Prejudice, it is seeing Pemberley for the first time that sparks Elizabeth's love for Darcy. Duckworth writes that "when Elizabeth comes to exclaim to herself that 'to be mistress of Pemberley might be something' she has, we might conjecture, come to recognize not merely the money and status of Pemberley, but its value as the setting of a traditional social and ethical orientation, its possibilities ... as a context for her responsible social activity."

=== Individual and society ===
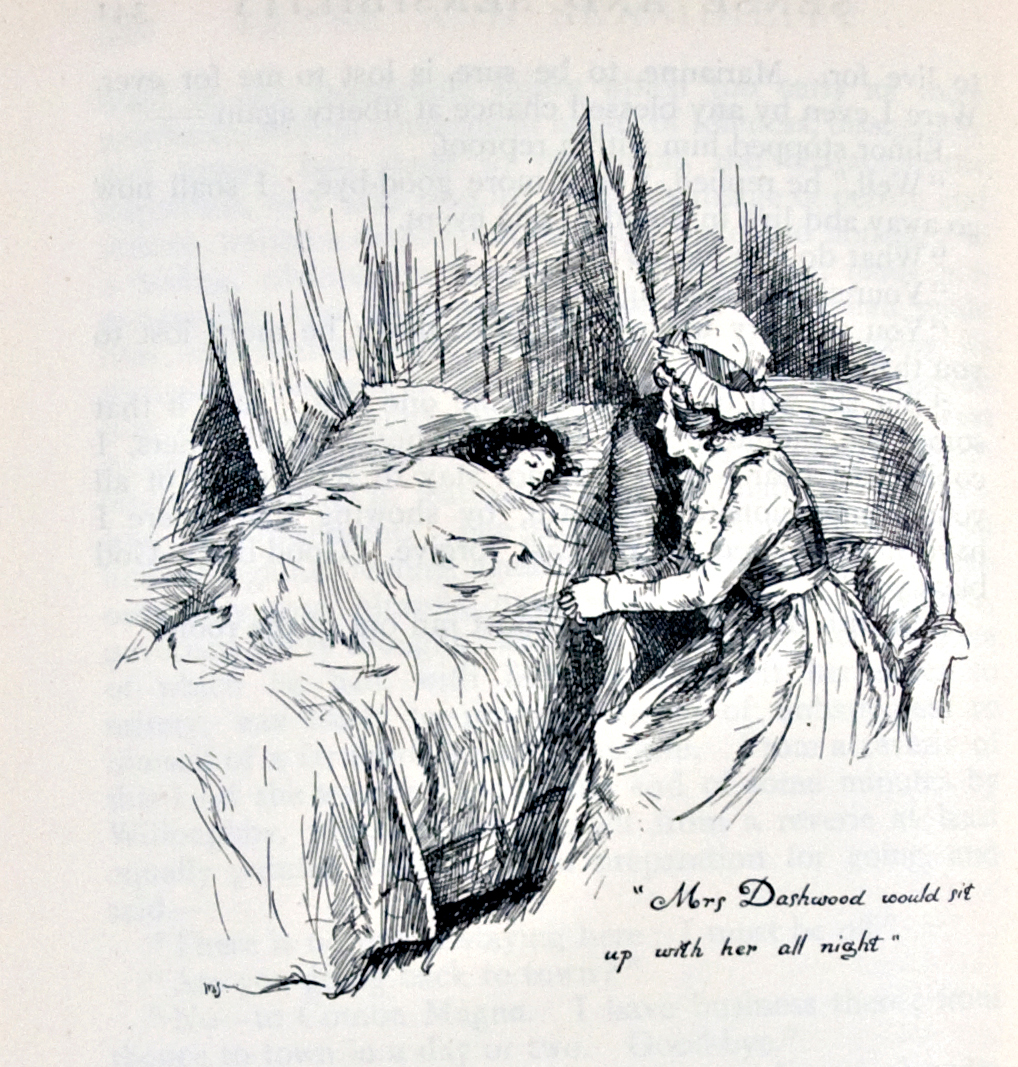
After being rejected by Willoughby, Marianne is consumed by a fever, as are many heroines of sensibility. (Chris Hammond, 1899)

Throughout Austen's work there is a tension between the claims of society and the claims of the individual. There are two major scholarly traditions in this area. Some critics, such as Reginald Ferrar, D. W. Harding and Marvin Mudrick, (Note: For a discussion of the views of these critics, see Reception history of Jane Austen.) have argued that Austen's style is detached; her work is ironically distanced and subtly subverts the prevailing values of her society. Her novels, partly through their use of free indirect speech, are part of the development of individualism and individual consciousness, represented in the history of the novel through works by authors such as Samuel Richardson, whose "fascination with inner life" influenced Austen.

In her influential book Desire and Domestic Fiction (1987), Nancy Armstrong argued that the modern individual self is a construct of late-18th and early-19th-century domestic fiction. According to Armstrong, "written representations of the self allowed the modern individual to become an economic and psychological reality". Perhaps her most important point is that subjectivity is constituted through language, specifically the printed word. In the section of her book devoted to Austen, Armstrong compares and contrasts Emma with Richardson's Pamela and contends that the novel demonstrates the power of language to construct and deconstruct communities and selves. As Wiltshire has observed, "middle class" British society in Austen's time placed a premium on outward decorum, manners and the limitation of emotional distress to "private" life. In Austen's novels, the reader is aware that a character is suffering psychological stress or disturbance, but the other characters are aware only of physical symptoms and complaints. The body becomes a place of social tension in these novels. For example, Mrs. Bennet continually refers to her "poor nerves", a bodily affliction which it was appropriate to discuss. Her obvious emotional frustrations were not an appropriate topic, as the notion of the private, individualized self developed.

Other critics, such as Duckworth, contend that Austen's heroines "support and maintain an inherited structure of values and behavior", displaying a version of Christian stoicism. He emphasizes that Austen's novels highlight the dangers of individualism; her heroines emerge from isolation and despair to be reinstated into society. In Mansfield Park, in particular, the morally suspect characters—the Crawfords, Rushworth and the Bertram daughters—represent individualism. The heroine of Emma embodies the dangers of individualism as her position of power allows her to affect everyone in Highbury. In Sense and Sensibility, Austen juxtaposes Elinor, who regulates the expression of her feelings according to social conventions, with Marianne, who expresses her feelings in accordance with sensibility and literary conventions. The novel suggests that Elinor's behaviour "is based on a truer perception of the nature of emotions" than Marianne's, even though it is based on social convention, because those very conventions allow her to process emotions like grief, while sensibility forces Marianne to indulge it. By following social conventions, Elinor is more sensitive to the feelings of those around her; her emotions bring "together private and public experience, or one's relations with oneself and with others". Individual romantic experience is less important than the social good that comes of Elinor's self-denial; however, that very self-denial leads to personal happiness in the end when she marries her love. As Lynch explains, "[a]s a whole Austen's writing is about social relations—the relationship between, say, domestic life and public life—and about reading relations—about the textual conventions by which audiences are formed and distinguished. Her narratives weave together the processes of romantic choice and cultural discrimination."

Austen's heroines often incur a cost to themselves during this social integration. Feminist critics have highlighted the ways in which her heroines accommodate themselves to masculine power by sacrificing their own creativity. Elizabeth and Emma search for replacement father figures in ways that suggest "why female survival depends on gaining male approval and protection". These father figures, who are often also mentors, show Austen's connection to the 18th-century novel, which includes many such figures. Gilbert and Gubar argue that Austen's heroines often have a fragmented self—the private and the public—pointing to Mansfield Park as the most dramatic example.

== Bibliography ==
- Armstrong, Nancy. Desire and Domestic Fiction. London: Oxford University Press, 1987. ISBN 0-19-506160-8.
- Austen, Jane. Mansfield Park. Ed. Claudia J. Johnson. 1814. New York: W. W. Norton & Co., 1998. ISBN 0-393-96791-3.
- Austen, Jane. Northanger Abbey. Ed. Marilyn Butler. 1817. New York: Penguin Books, 1995. ISBN 0-14-043413-5.
- Austen, Jane. Pride and Prejudice. Ed. Donald Gray. 1813. New York: W. W. Norton and Co., 1993. ISBN 0-393-96294-6.
- Austen, Jane. Sense and Sensibility. Ed. Ros Ballaster. 1811. New York: Penguin Books, 1995. ISBN 0-14-043425-9.
- Benedict, Barbara M. "Sensibility by the Numbers: Austen's Work as Regency Popular Fiction". Janeites: Austen's Disciples and Devotees. Ed. Deidre Lynch. Princeton: Princeton University Press, 2000. 63–86. ISBN 0-691-05005-8.
- Brownstein, Rachel M. "Northanger Abbey, Sense and Sensibility, Pride and Prejudice". The Cambridge Companion to Jane Austen. Eds. Edward Copeland and Juliet McMaster. Cambridge: Cambridge University Press, 1997. 32–57. ISBN 0-521-49867-8.
- Burrows, John F. "Style". The Cambridge Companion to Jane Austen. Eds. Edward Copeland and Juliet McMaster. Cambridge: Cambridge University Press, 1997. 170–188. ISBN 0-521-49867-8.
- Butler, Marilyn. Jane Austen and the War of Ideas. 1975 and 1987. Oxford: Oxford University Press, 2002. ISBN 0-19-812968-8.
- Collins, Irene. Jane Austen and the Clergy. London: The Hambledon Press, 1994. ISBN 1-85285-114-7.
- Copeland, Edward. "Money". The Cambridge Companion to Jane Austen. Eds. Edward Copeland and Juliet McMaster. Cambridge: Cambridge University Press, 1997. 131–48. ISBN 0-521-49867-8.
- Copeland, Edward. "Money". Jane Austen In Context. Ed.Todd, Janet, Cambridge: Cambridge University Press, 2005. ISBN 0-521-82644-6.
- Doody, Margaret. "The Short Fiction". The Cambridge Companion to Jane Austen. Eds. Edward Copeland and Juliet McMaster. Cambridge: Cambridge University Press, 1997. 84–99. ISBN 0-521-49867-8.
- Doody, Margaret. "Reading". The Jane Austen Companion. Ed. J. David Grey. New York: Macmillan, 1986. ISBN 0-025-45540-0.
- Devlin, D. D. Jane Austen and Education. London: Macmillan, 1975. ISBN 0-333-14431-7.
- Duckworth, Alistair M. The Improvement of the Estate: A Study of Jane Austen's Novels. Baltimore: Johns Hopkins University Press, 1971. ISBN 0-8018-1269-0.
- Fergus, Jan. Jane Austen and the Didactic Novel. Totowa: Barnes & Noble, 1983. ISBN 0-389-20228-2.
- Ferguson, Moira. "Mansfield Park, Slavery, Colonialism, and Gender". Oxford Literary Review 13 (1991): 118–39.
- Fraiman, Susan. "Jane Austen and Edward Said: Gender, Culture, and Imperialism". Janeites: Austen's Disciples and Devotees. Ed. Deidre Lynch. Princeton: Princeton University Press, 2000. 206–23. ISBN 0-691-05005-8.
- Galperin, William. The Historical Austen. Philadelphia: University of Pennsylvania Press, 2003. ISBN 0-8122-3687-4.
- Galperin, William. "Austen's Earliest Readers and the Rise of the Janeites". Janeites: Austen's Disciples and Devotees. Ed. Deidre Lynch. Princeton: Princeton University Press, 2000. 87–114. ISBN 0-691-05005-8.
- Grundy, Isobel. "Jane Austen and Literary Traditions". The Cambridge Companion to Jane Austen. Eds. Edward Copeland and Juliet McMaster. Cambridge: Cambridge University Press, 1997. 189–210. ISBN 0-521-49867-8.
- Gubar, Susan and Sandra Gilbert. The Madwoman in the Attic: The Woman Writer and the Nineteenth Century Literary Imagination. 1979. New Haven: Yale University Press, 1984. ISBN 0-300-02596-3.
- Harding, D. W., "Regulated Hatred: An Aspect of the Work of Jane Austen". Jane Austen: A Collection of Critical Essays. Ed. Ian Watt. Englewood Cliffs, NJ: Prentice-Hall, 1963.
- Honan, Park. Jane Austen: A Life. New York: St. Martin's Press, 1987. ISBN 0-312-01451-1.
- Jenkyns, Richard. A Fine Brush on Ivory: An Appreciation of Jane Austen. Oxford: Oxford University Press, 2004. ISBN 0-19-927661-7.
- Johnson, Claudia L. Jane Austen: Women, Politics and the Novel. Chicago: University of Chicago Press, 1988. ISBN 0-226-40139-1.
- Kelly, Gary. "Religion and politics". The Cambridge Companion to Jane Austen. Eds. Edward Copeland and Juliet McMaster. Cambridge: Cambridge University Press, 1997. 149–169. ISBN 0-521-49867-8.
- Keymer, Thomas. "Rank". Jane Austen In Context. Ed. Janet Todd. Cambridge: Cambridge University Press, 2005. 387–96. ISBN 0-521-82644-6.
- Kirkham, Margaret. Jane Austen, Feminism and Fiction. Brighton: Harvester, 1983. ISBN 0-7108-0468-7.
- Lascelles, Mary. Jane Austen and Her Art. 1939. Oxford: Oxford University Press, 1966.
- Le Faye, Deirdre, ed. Jane Austen's Letters. Oxford: Oxford University Press, 1995. ISBN 0-19-283297-2.
- Le Faye, Deirdre. "Chronology of Jane Austen's Life". The Cambridge Companion to Jane Austen. Eds. Edward Copeland and Juliet McMaster. Cambridge: Cambridge University Press, 1997. 1–11. ISBN 0-521-49867-8.
- Litz, A. Walton. Jane Austen: A Study of Her Development. New York: Oxford University Press, 1965.
- Looser, Devoney. The Daily Jane Austen: A Year of Quotes. Chicago: University of Chicago Press, 2019. ISBN 0-226-65544-X.
- Lynch, Deidre. The Economy of Character. Chicago: University of Chicago Press, 1998. ISBN 0-226-49820-4.
- MacDonagh, Oliver. Jane Austen: Real and Imagined Worlds. New Haven: Yale University Press, 1991. ISBN 0-300-05084-4.
- Mandal, Anthony. "Language". Jane Austen In Context. Ed. Janet Todd. Cambridge: Cambridge University Press, 2005. 23–32. ISBN 0-521-82644-6.
- McMaster, Juliet. "Class". The Cambridge Companion to Jane Austen. Eds. Edward Copeland and Juliet McMaster. Cambridge: Cambridge University Press, 1997. 115–30. ISBN 0-521-49867-8.
- Mudrick, Marvin. Jane Austen: Irony as Defense and Discovery. Berkeley: University of California Press, 1952.
- Page, Norman. The Language of Jane Austen. Oxford: Blackwell, 1972. ISBN 0-631-08280-8.
- Richardson, Alan. "Reading practices". Jane Austen In Context. Ed. Janet Todd. Cambridge: Cambridge University Press, 2005. 397–405. ISBN 0-521-82644-6.
- Said, Edward. Culture and Imperialism. 1993. New York: Vintage Books, 1994. ISBN 0-679-75054-1.
- Scott, Walter. "Walter Scott, an unsigned review of Emma, Quarterly Review". Jane Austen: The Critical Heritage, 1812–1870. Ed. B. C. Southam. London: Routledge and Kegan Paul, 1968. ISBN 0-7100-2942-X. 58–69.
- Southam, B. C. "Criticism, 1870–1940". The Jane Austen Companion. Ed. J. David Grey. New York: Macmillan, 1986. 102–09. ISBN 0-025-45540-0.
- Stabler, Jane. "Literary influences". Jane Austen In Context. Ed. Janet Todd. Cambridge: Cambridge University Press, 2005. 41–50. ISBN 0-521-82644-6.
- Sutherland, Kathryn. Jane Austen's Textual Lives: From Aeschylus to Bollywood. Oxford: Oxford University Press, 2005. ISBN 0-19-925872-4.
- Todd, Janet. The Cambridge Introduction to Jane Austen. Cambridge: Cambridge University Press, 2006. ISBN 978-0-521-67469-0.
- Tomalin, Claire. Jane Austen: A Life. New York: Alfred A. Knopf, 1997. ISBN 0-679-44628-1.
- Tucker. "Amateur Theatricals at Steventon". The Jane Austen Companion. Ed. J. David Grey. New York: Macmillan, 1986. ISBN 0-025-45540-0.
- Waldron, Mary. Jane Austen and the Fiction of Her Time. Cambridge: Cambridge University Press, 1999. ISBN 0-521-00388-1.
- Wiltshire, John. Jane Austen and the Body: The Picture of Health. Cambridge: Cambridge University Press, 1992. ISBN 0-521-41476-8.
