= Ellen Moers =

- Born: 1928
- Died: 1979 (aged 50–51)
- Occupation: literary critic
- Known for: gynocriticism
- Notable work: Literary Women (1976)

Ellen Moers (1928–1979) was an American academic and literary scholar. She is best known for her pioneering contribution to gynocriticism, Literary Women (1976). and leading her to write Literary Women. In the latter she established the existence of a strong nineteenth-century tradition of (international) women writers—her identification within it of what she called 'female Gothic' proving especially influential.

In the fast-moving world of feminist scholarship, her book would be challenged in the following decade as under-theorised and ethnocentric; but continued nonetheless to serve as a significant stepping-stone for future scholarship.

== Twin traditions ==
Moers pointed to the ambiguous origins of The Dandy:Brummell to Beerbohm, in a merger of French and English traditions; to the paradox in the dandy's highly structured pose of inaction; and to the role of the female dandy.

In Two Dreisers she indicated Dreiser's twin role on the cusp between 19th-century realism and 20th-century realism, as well as his roots in the different religious traditions of Catholicism and Protestantism.

== See also ==
- Beau Brummell
- Anna Louise Germaine de Stael
- Sandra Gilbert
