= Thomas McFarland =

American literary critic (1927–2011)

Professor Thomas A. McFarland (1926-2011) was a literary critic who specialised in the literature of Samuel Taylor Coleridge. He was Murray Professor of Romantic English Literature at Princeton University.

McFarland established his reputation with Coleridge and Pantheist Tradition (1969), where he argued that Coleridge was struggling to reconcile two types of philosophy; the philosophy of the 'it is' and the philosophy of the 'I am'. This concept and the book have been criticised due to McFarland's poor understanding of the philosophical background and simplistic adoption of this concept from Coleridge himself, which in turn led to problematic interpretations of specific philosophers such as Spinoza, Friedrich Wilhelm Joseph Schelling and Friedrich Heinrich Jacobi.

According to reports in the New York Times, McFarland resigned his professorship in 1989 following an accusation of sexual assault on a male student. Prior to his resignation he had been placed on a one-year suspension, but the reports suggest this led to the resignations of the chairman of the department Emory Elliott, along with Margaret Doody, Sandra Gilbert and Valerie Smith because they thought McFarland was treated too leniently.

Thomas McFarland near Oxford around 1987.

Despite this scandal, a Festschrift entitled The Coleridge Connection: Essays for Thomas McFarland (Palgrave), was released in 1990 in his honour, which "explores what McFarland calls the symbiotic nature of Coleridge’s friendship and collaborations".

He died in 2011, aged 84.

== Books ==
- Coleridge and the Pantheist Tradition (1969)
- Romanticism and the Forms of Ruin (1981)
- Originality and Imagination (1984 Johns Hopkins University Press)
- Romantic Cruxes: The English Essayists and the Spirit of the Age (1987)
- William Wordsworth, Intensity and Achievement (1992)
- Romanticism and the Heritage of Rousseau (1995)
- Paradoxes of freedom: The Romantic Mystique of Transcendence (1996)
- The Mask of Keats (2000)
- Shakespeare's Pastoral Comedy (2009, UNCP)

== Edited ==
- Coleridge, Samuel Taylor. Opus Maximum, Vol 16 of the Collected Works of Samuel Taylor Coleridge (Princeton University Press, 2002)
