= Emory Elliott =

American academic (1942–2009)

- Born: October 30, 1942; Baltimore, Maryland, U.S.
- Died: March 31, 2009 (aged 66); Riverside, California

Academic background
- Education: Bowling Green State University; University of Illinois at Urbana-Champaign

Academic work
- Discipline: American literature
- Institutions: University of California, Riverside; United States Military Academy; Princeton University

Emory Bernard Elliott (October 30, 1942 – March 31, 2009) was an American professor of American literature at UC Riverside.

Elliott was known in particular for advocating the expansion of the literary canon to include a more diverse range of voices.

== Childhood and education ==
Elliott came from a working-class background in Baltimore, Md., and was the first in his family to earn a college degree. After earning his bachelor's in English from Loyola College on a Reserve Officers' Training Corps (ROTC) scholarship, he received a master's from Bowling Green State University. He served in the Army at Fort Sill in Oklahoma and was an instructor at the U.S. Military Academy in West Point, N.Y., before going on to earn a PhD from the University of Illinois.

== Professional career ==
Early on in his career he focused on early American Literature, publishing two seminal works on the topic: Power and the Pulpit in Puritan New England in 1975 and Revolutionary Writers: Literature and Authority in the New Republic in 1982. In 1988, he edited the controversial and groundbreaking Columbia Literary History of the United States, the first major multicultural anthology of American literature.

According to reports in the New York Times, Elliott, along with Valerie Smith, Margaret Doody, and Sandra Gilbert all resigned from Princeton in 1989. The reports suggest that the four were unhappy with the leniency shown to Thomas McFarland after he was accused of sexual misconduct. McFarland was initially put on a one-year suspension, but eventually took early retirement after these resignations and threats of student boycotts.

He joined University of California, Riverside in 1989, and in 2001 was named a University Professor, a designation of a small number (36) top scholars and teachers in the University of California system that grants them access to all campuses.

He directed UC Riverside's Center for Ideas and Society from 1996, enhancing the reputation of the institute and its scope by winning grants from foundations.

His most significant professional appointments were at Princeton University, where he worked for 17 years, serving at various points as the chairman of the American Studies program and the English Department. There he also received the university's Distinguished Service Award for his work on the Women's Studies Program.

He was appointed to many academic societies including the National Endowment for the Humanities, the American Council of Learned Societies, Guggenheim, the National Humanities Center, and the Institute for the Humanities at the University of California, Irvine. He was president of the American Studies Association in 2006–07.

== Personal life ==
Elliott was married and had five children.

== Awards ==
- 1989 American Book Award for Columbia Literary History of the United States

== Bibliography ==
- Emory Elliott; Jasmine Payne; Patricia Ploesch, eds. (2007). Global migration, social change, and cultural transformation. Palgrave Macmillan. ISBN 978-0-230-60054-6.
- Emory Elliott (2002). The Cambridge introduction to early American literature. Cambridge University Press. ISBN 978-0-521-52041-6.
- Emory Elliott; Louis Freitas Caton; Jeffrey Rhyne, eds. (2002). Aesthetics in a multicultural age. Oxford University Press. ISBN 978-0-19-514632-5. "Emory Elliott."
- Mark Twain (1999). Emory Elliott (ed.). Adventures of Huckleberry Finn. Introduction Emory Elliott. Oxford University Press. ISBN 978-0-19-282441-7.
- Emory Elliott; Cathy N. Davidson, eds. (1991). The Columbia history of the American novel. Introduction Emory Elliott. Columbia University Press. ISBN 978-0-231-07360-8. "Emory Elliott."
- Emory Elliott; Linda K. Kerber; A. Walton Litz; Terence Martin, eds. (1991). American Literature: A Prentice Hall Anthology. Prentice Hall. ISBN 978-0-13-027244-7.
- Emory Elliott; Martha Banta; Houston A. Baker, eds. (1988). Columbia literary history of the United States. Photographer Martha Banta. Columbia University Press. ISBN 978-0-231-05812-4. "Emory Elliott."
- Emory Elliott (1986). Revolutionary Writers: Literature and Authority in the New Republic, 1725-1810. Oxford University Press. ISBN 978-0-19-503995-5.
- Emory Elliott, ed. (1984). American colonial writers, 1606-1734. Gale Research Co.
- Emory Elliott, ed. (1979). Puritan influences in American literature. University of Illinois Press. ISBN 978-0-252-00733-0.
