= Margaret Doody =

Canadian author

Margaret Anne Doody (born September 21, 1939) is a Canadian author of historical detective fiction and feminist literary critic. She is professor of literature at the University of Notre Dame, helped found the PhD in Literature Program at Notre Dame, and served as its director from 2001 to 2007.

== Academic career ==
Doody completed her doctorate at the University of Oxford in 1968. She then taught at the University of Wales from 1969 to 1976, after which she taught at Princeton University.

According to the New York Times, Doody, along with Valerie Smith, Emory Elliott, and Sandra Gilbert, resigned from Princeton in 1989. The reports suggest that the four were unhappy with the leniency shown to Thomas McFarland after he was accused of sexual misconduct. McFarland was initially put on a one-year suspension, but eventually took early retirement after these resignations and threats of student boycotts.

Subsequently, she taught at Vanderbilt University and the University of Notre Dame.

== Bibliography ==
=== The Aristotle series ===
- Aristotle Detective (1978)
- Aristotle and Poetic Justice (2000)
- Aristotle and the Mystery of Life (also published as Aristotle and the Secrets of Life) (2002)
- Aristotle and the Ring of Bronze (2003)
- Poison in Athens (2004)
- Mysteries of Eleusis (2005)
- Aristotle and the Egyptian Murders (2010)
- A cloudy day in Babylon (2013)

=== Short story of the Aristotle series ===
- Aristotle and the Fatal Javelin (1980)

=== Other novels ===
- The Alchemists (1980)

=== Academic books ===
- A Natural Passion: A Study of the Novels of Samuel Richardson (1974)
- The Daring Muse: Augustan Poetry Reconsidered (1985)
- Frances Burney: The Life in the Works (1996)
- The True Story of the Novel (1996)
- Tropic of Venice (2007)
- Jane Austen's Names: Riddles, Persons, Places (2015)
