= Gynocriticism =

Literary project expanding the study of women writers

Gynocriticism or gynocritics is the term coined in the seventies by Elaine Showalter to describe a new literary project intended to construct "a female framework for the analysis of women's literature".

By expanding the historical study of women writers as a distinct literary tradition, gynocritics sought to develop new models based on the study of female experience to replace male models of literary creation, and so "map the territory" left unexplored in earlier literary criticisms.

== History ==
While previous figures like Virginia Woolf and Simone de Beauvoir had already begun to review and evaluate the female image in literature, and second-wave feminism had explored phallocentrism and sexism through a female reading of male authors, gynocriticism was designed as a "second phase" in feminist criticism – turning to a focus on, and interrogation of female authorship, images, the feminine experience and ideology, and the history and development of the female literary tradition.

== Development as a literary critique ==
Gynocriticism also examines the female struggle for identity and the social construct of gender. According to Elaine Showalter, gynocritics is the study of not only the female as a gender status but also the 'internalized consciousness' of the female. The uncovering of the female subculture and exposition of a female model is the intention of gynocriticism, comprising recognition of a distinct female canon where a female identity is sought free from the masculine definitions and oppositions.

Gynocriticism accordingly challenged a Freudian psychoanalytic perspective whereby the female inherently suffers envy of men and feelings of inadequacy and injustice, combined with feelings of intellectual inferiority. Arguing that male 'phallic prejudice' itself creates a female consciousness that demands a critique, and that prejudice against the female incites a specific noesis that gets attributed to the female, Gynocriticism stressed that this prejudice has concealed the female literary tradition to the point of imitating the masculine.

== Achievements and limitations ==
Gynocriticism helped reclaim from obscurity a vast body of early female writings, often published in Virago, as well as producing such feminist classics as The Madwoman in the Attic. However its very successes left it open to new challenges from within feminism. Poststructuralists complained that it fetishized the role of the author, at the expense of the reader and the text, and that its grand narrative, setting up a female canon in opposition to the male, was essentialist, and omitted differences and divisions among women, leaving out lesbians and women of color, for example.

Race, class, social interest, political inclination, religion and sexuality all arguably come into play in the construction of identity. Separating out such properties would create a one-dimensional view of the female, yet if gender and identity are merely constructs then it becomes difficult to assign any inherent qualities to nature or language to found a critique.

Despite such limitations, gynocriticism offers a valuable interrogation of 'female' literature, through the study of sameness and difference in gender. While the term is rarely used in third-wave feminism, the practices and canon establishment of gynocriticism continues to underpin feminist literary criticism.

== See also ==
- Ellen Moers
- Ecriture feminine
- Feminist studies
