= Elaine Showalter =

American literary critic, feminist and writer

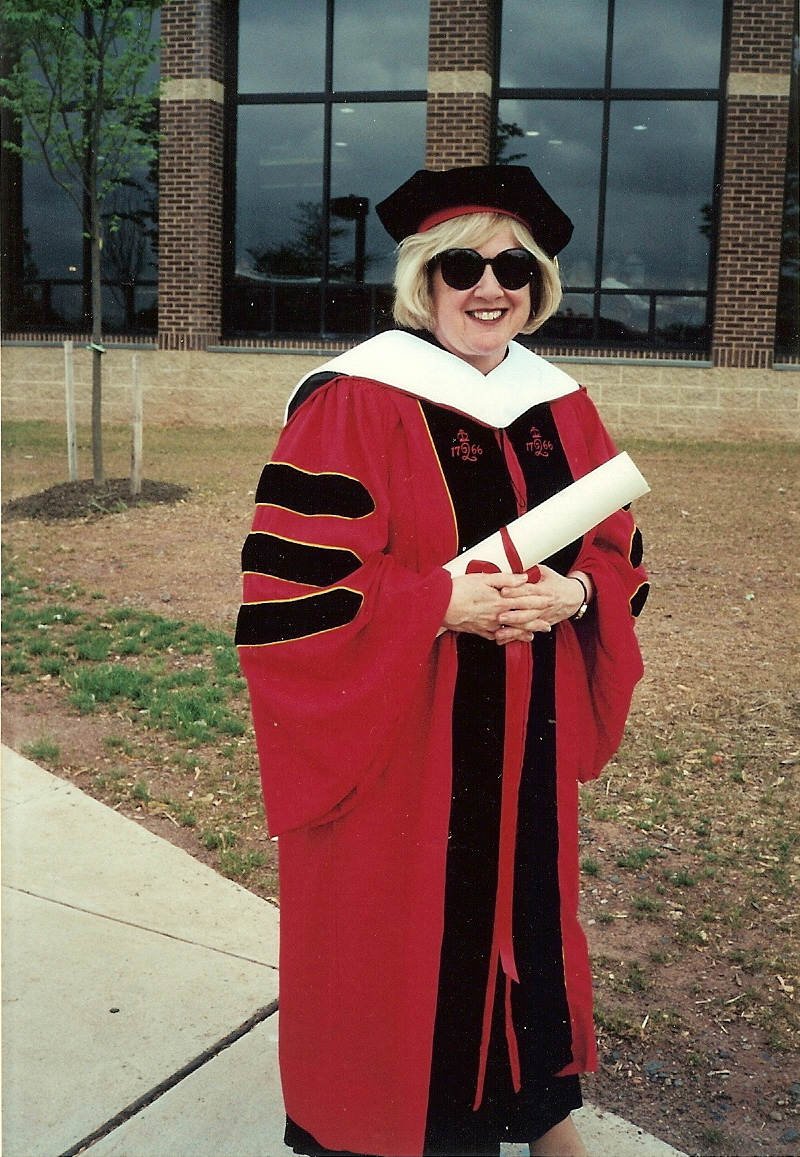
- Showalter receiving an honorary degree in 2001
- Born: Elaine Cottler; January 21, 1941 (age 85); Boston, Massachusetts, U.S.
- Education: Bryn Mawr College; Brandeis University; University of California, Davis
- Known for: Gynocriticism
- Spouse: English Showalter
- Children: 2, inc. Michael Showalter

Elaine Showalter (born January 21, 1941) is an American literary critic, feminist, and writer on cultural and social issues. She influenced feminist literary criticism in the United States academia, developing the concept and practice of gynocritics, a term describing the study of "women as writers".

Showalter has written and edited numerous books and articles focused on a variety of subjects, from feminist literary criticism to fashion, sometimes sparking controversy, especially with her work on illnesses. Showalter has been a television critic for People magazine and a commentator on BBC radio and television. She received the Truman Capote Award for Literary Criticism in 2003.

== Career ==
Showalter is a specialist in Victorian literature and the fin de siècle (turn of the 20th century). Her most innovative work in this field is in madness and hysteria in literature, specifically in women's writing and in the portrayal of female characters.

She is the Avalon Foundation Professor Emerita. Her academic honors include a Guggenheim Fellowship and a Rockefeller Humanities fellowship (1981–82). She is also the past-president of the Modern Language Association (MLA).

Showalter's best known works are Towards a Feminist Poetics (1979), The Female Malady: Women, Madness, and English Culture (1830–1980) (1985), Sexual Anarchy: Gender and Culture at the Fin de Siecle (1990), Hystories: Hysterical Epidemics and Modern Media (1997), and Inventing Herself: Claiming a Feminist Intellectual Heritage (2001). In 2007, Showalter was chair of the judges for the prestigious British literary award, the Man Booker International Prize.

In 2011, she was elected a Fellow of the Royal Society of Literature, while in 2012, she also received an honorary degree from the University of St. Andrews in Scotland.

=== Critical importance ===
Showalter's book Inventing Herself (2001), a survey of feminist icons, was the culmination of a lengthy interest in communicating the importance of understanding feminist tradition. Showalter's early essays and editorial work in the late 1970s and the 1980s survey the history of the feminist tradition within the "wilderness" of literary theory and criticism. Working in the field of feminist literary theory and criticism, which was just emerging as a serious scholarly pursuit in universities in the 1970s, Showalter's writing reflects a conscious effort to convey the importance of mapping her discipline's past in order to both ground it in substantive theory, and amass a knowledge base that will be able to inform a path for future feminist academic pursuit.

In Towards a Feminist Poetics Showalter traces the history of women's literature, suggesting that it can be divided into three phases:

1. Feminine: In the Feminine phase (1840–1880), "women wrote in an effort to equal the intellectual achievements of the male culture and internalized its assumptions about female nature" (New, 137).
2. Feminist: The Feminist phase (1880–1920) was characterized by women's writing that protested against male standards and values, and advocated women's rights and values, including a demand for autonomy.
3. Female: The Female phase (1920— ) is one of self-discovery. Showalter says, "women reject both imitation and protest—two forms of dependency—and turn instead to female experience as the source of an autonomous art, extending the feminist analysis of culture to the forms and techniques of literature" (New, 139).

Rejecting both imitation and protest, Showalter advocated approaching feminist criticism from a cultural perspective in the current Female phase, rather than from perspectives that traditionally come from an androcentric perspective like psychoanalytic and biological theories, for example. Feminists in the past have worked within these traditions by revising and criticizing female representations, or lack thereof, in the male traditions (that is, in the Feminine and Feminist phases). In her essay Feminist Criticism in the Wilderness (1981), Showalter says, "A cultural theory acknowledges that there are important differences between women as writers: class, race, nationality, and history are literary determinants as significant as gender. Nonetheless, women's culture forms a collective experience within the cultural whole, an experience that binds women writers to each other over time and space" (New, 260).

Showalter does not advocate replacing psychoanalysis, for example, with cultural anthropology; rather, she suggests that approaching women's writing from a cultural perspective is one among many valid perspectives that will uncover female traditions. However, cultural anthropology and social history are especially fruitful because they "can perhaps offer us a terminology and a diagram of women's cultural situation" (New, 266). Showalter's caveat is that feminist critics must use cultural analyses as ways to understand what women write, rather than to dictate what they ought to write (New, 266).

However isolationist Showalter's perspective may sound at first, she does not advocate a separation of the female tradition from the male tradition. She argues that women must work both inside and outside the male tradition simultaneously (New, 264). Showalter says that the most constructive approach to future feminist theory and criticism lies in a focus on nurturing a new feminine cultural perspective within a feminist tradition that at the same time exists within the male tradition, but on which it is not dependent and to which it is not answerable.

=== Gynocritics ===
Showalter coined the term "gynocritics" to describe literary criticism based in on a female perspective. Probably the best description Showalter gives of gynocritics is in Towards a Feminist Poetics:

In contrast to [an] angry or loving fixation on male literature, the program of gynocritics is to construct a female framework for the analysis of women's literature, to develop new models based on the study of female experience, rather than to adapt male models and theories. Gynocritics begins at the point when we free ourselves from the linear absolutes of male literary history, stop trying to fit women between the lines of the male tradition, and focus instead on the newly visible world of female culture. (New, 131)

This does not mean that the goal of gynocritics is to erase the differences between male and female writing; gynocritics is not "on a pilgrimage to the promised land in which gender would lose its power, in which all texts would be sexless and equal, like angels" (New, 266). Rather gynocritics aims to understand women's writing not as a product of sexism but as a fundamental aspect of female reality.

Showalter acknowledges the difficulty of "[d]efining the unique difference of women's writing", which she says is "a slippery and demanding task" in "Feminist Criticism in the Wilderness" (New, 249). She says that gynocritics may never succeed in understanding the special differences of women's writing, or realize a distinct female literary tradition. But, with grounding in theory and historical research, Showalter sees gynocriticism as a way to "learn something solid, enduring, and real about the relation of women to literary culture" (New, 249). She stresses heavily the need to free "ourselves from the lineal absolute of male literary history". That is going to be the point where gynocritics make a beginning.

The Female Malady was consulted by Elaine DiRollo in "A Proper Education for Girls."

== Criticism and controversy ==
=== Feminist theory and criticism ===
Duke University-based Toril Moi, in her 1985 book Sexual/Textual Politics, described Showalter's as a limited, essentialist view of women. Moi particularly criticized Showalter's ideas regarding the Female phase, and its notions of a woman's singular autonomy and necessary search inward for a female identity. In a predominantly poststructuralist era that proposes that meaning is contextual and historical, and that identity is socially and linguistically constructed, Moi claimed that there is no fundamental female self.

According to Moi, the problem of equality in literary theory does not lie in the fact that the literary canon is fundamentally male and unrepresentative of female tradition, rather the problem lies in the fact that a canon exists at all. Moi argues that a feminine literary canon would be no less oppressive than the male canon because it would necessarily represent a particular socio demographic class of woman; it could not possibly represent all women because female tradition is drastically different depending on class, ethnicity, social values, sexuality, etc. A female consciousness cannot exist for the same reasons. Moi objects to what she sees as an essentialist position – that is, she objects to any determination of identity based on gender. Moi's criticism was influential as part of a larger debate between essentialist and postmodern feminist theorists at the time.

=== Hysteria and "modern" illnesses ===
Showalter's controversial take on illnesses such as dissociative identity disorder (formerly called multiple personality disorder), Gulf War syndrome and chronic fatigue syndrome in her book Hystories: Hysterical Epidemics and Modern Media (1997) has angered some in the health profession and many who suffer from these illnesses. Writing in The New York Times, psychologist Carol Tavris commented that "In the absence of medical certainty, the belief that all such symptoms are psychological in origin is no improvement over the belief that none of them are." Showalter (who has no formal medical training) has not been deterred from her position that these conditions are contemporary manifestations of hysteria.

=== Popular culture ===
Showalter also came up against criticism in the late 1990s for some of her writing on popular culture that appeared in magazines like People and Vogue. Deirdre English, in the American magazine The Nation, wrote:

As the poststructuralist critique of identity politics took hold over the following decade and more, it became unfashionable, in ideas and in dress, it seemed, for the avant-garde of the female professoriate to identify with either men or women.

English quotes Showalter's controversial 1997 Vogue article:

From Mary Wollstonecraft to Naomi Wolf, feminism has often taken a hard line on fashion, shopping, and the whole beauty Monty.... But for those of us sisters hiding Welcome to Your Facelift inside The Second Sex, a passion for fashion can sometimes seem a shameful secret life.... I think it's time I came out of the closet.

Showalter was reportedly severely criticized by her academic colleagues for her stance in favour of patriarchal symbols of consumer capitalism and traditional femininity. Showalter's rejoinder was: "We needn't fall into postmodern apocalyptic despair about the futility of political action or the impossibility of theoretical correctness as a pre-condition for action" (English).

=== Academic teaching ===
Teaching Literature (2006) was widely and positively reviewed, especially in the American journal Pedagogy, which gave it three review-essays and called it "the book we wish we had in our backpacks when we started teaching."

== Summaries of major works ==
Showalter's Ph.D. thesis is called The Double Critical Standard: Criticism of Women Writers in England, 1845–1880 (1969) and was later turned into the book A Literature of Their Own: British Women Novelists from Brontë to Lessing (1978), which contains a lengthy and much-discussed chapter on Virginia Woolf.

The Female Malady: Women, Madness, and English Culture, 1830–1980 (1985) discusses hysteria, which was once known as the "female malady" and according to Showalter, is called depression today. Showalter demonstrates how cultural ideas about proper feminine behaviour have shaped the definition and treatment of female insanity from the Victorian era to the present.

Sexual Anarchy: Gender and Culture at the Fin de Siecle (1990) outlines a history of the sexes and the crises, themes, and problems associated with the battle for sexual supremacy and identity.

In the 1990s, Showalter began writing for popular magazines, bringing her work further into the public sphere than it ever had been during her academic career. Showalter was the television critic for People magazine in 1996. She explains her impetus to do popular cultural work: "I've always really loved popular culture, but it wasn't something serious intellectuals were supposed to be concerned about. … I would like to be able to bring my background and my skills to subjects that do reach a wide audience" (Plett).

In Hystories: Hysterical Epidemics and Modern Media (1997) Showalter argues that hysteria, a medical condition traditionally seen as feminine, has persisted for centuries and is now manifesting itself in cultural phenomena in the forms of socially and medically accepted maladies. Psychological and physical effects of unhappy lives become "hysterical epidemics" when popular media saturate the public with paranoid reports and findings, essentially legitimizing, as Showalter calls them, "imaginary illnesses" (Hystories, cover). Showalter says: "Hysteria is part of everyday life. It not only survives in the 1990s, but it is more contagious than in the past. Newspapers, magazines, talk shows, self-help books, and of course the Internet ensure that ideas, once planted, manifest themselves internationally as symptoms" (Plett). This view has caused Showalter to be criticized by patient's rights groups and medical practitioners, who argue that Showalter, with no formal medical training, is not qualified to make this determination.

Inventing Herself: Claiming a Feminist Intellectual Heritage (2001) surveys feminist icons since the 18th century, situated mostly in the US and the United Kingdom. Showalter covers the contributions of predominately intellectuals like Mary Wollstonecraft, Charlotte Perkins Gilman and Camille Paglia. Noting popular media's importance to the perception of women and feminism today, Showalter also discusses the contributions of popular personalities like Oprah Winfrey and Princess Diana.

Teaching Literature (2003) is essentially a guide to teaching English literature to undergraduate students in university. Showalter covers approaches to teaching theory, preparing syllabi and talking about taboo subjects among many other practical topics. Showalter says that teaching should be taken as seriously and given as much intellectual consideration as scholarship.

Faculty Towers: The Academic Novel and Its Discontents (2005) is a study of the Anglo-American academic novel from the 1950s to the present.

A Jury of Her Peers: American Women Writers from Anne Bradstreet to Annie Proulx (2009) makes a claim for a literary tradition of American women writers. This book won the 2012 Truman Capote Award for Literary Criticism.

The Civil Wars of Julia Ward Howe (2016) is a biography of American feminist pioneer Julia Ward Howe, best known for writing the words to "The Battle Hymn of the Republic".

== Personal life ==
Showalter was born Elaine Cottler in January 1941 in Boston, Massachusetts. Her family was middle-class and Jewish, and her father was in the wool business while her mother was a housewife. Showalter earned a bachelor's degree at Bryn Mawr College, a master's degree at Brandeis University, and a PhD in 1970 at the University of California, Davis. Her first academic appointment was at Douglass College at Rutgers University-New Brunswick. She joined Princeton University's faculty in 1984, and took early retirement in 2003.

At the age of 21, Showalter became engaged to her now-husband, English Showalter, whose family was Episcopalian. Her parents strongly disapproved of her marrying someone who was not Jewish and this, among other reasons, led to Showalter distancing herself from her family for some time. For about fifteen years, Showalter characterized this distance as her having been disowned by her parents. In a 2020 interview, she referred to it as a "narrative" or "story," not necessarily the reality of her circumstances.

Her husband is a Yale-educated retired professor of 18th-century French literature who taught at Rutgers University-Camden. The Showalters have two children, Michael Showalter, an actor and comedian, and Vinca Showalter LaFleur, a professional speechwriter.

== Archives ==
Papers of Elaine Showalter are held at the Women's Library at the Library of the London School of Economics, and at the Pembroke Center Archives, Brown University (MS.2020.007).

== Bibliography ==
- A Literature of Their Own: British Women Novelists from Brontë to Lessing. Princeton, N.J.: Princeton University Press, 1977.
- "Towards a Feminist Poetics," Women's Writing and Writing About Women. London: Croom Helm, 1979.
- "Feminist Criticism in the Wilderness," Critical Inquiry 8. University of Chicago: Winter, 1981.
- The Female Malady: Women, Madness, and English Culture, 1830–1980. New York: Pantheon Books, 1985.
- (Editor) The New Feminist Criticism: Essays on Women, Literature, and Theory. New York: Pantheon Books, 1985.
- Sexual Anarchy: Gender and Culture at the Fin de Siècle. New York: Viking, 1990.
- Sister’s Choice: Tradition and Change in American Women’s Writing. The Clarendon Lectures 1989. New York: Viking, 1991.
- Hystories: Hysterical Epidemics and Modern Media. New York: Columbia University Press, 1997.
- Inventing Herself: Claiming a Feminist Intellectual Heritage. New York: Scribner, 2001.
- Teaching Literature. Oxford: Blackwell, 2003.
- Faculty Towers: The Academic Novel and Its Discontents. Philadelphia: University of Pennsylvania Press, 2005.
- "Saint Jane". Granta (108): 85–95. Autumn 2009.
- A Jury of Her Peers: Celebrating American Women Writers from Anne Bradstreet to Annie Proulx. New York: Knopf, 2009.
- The Civil Wars of Julia Ward Howe: A Biography. New York: Simon & Schuster, 2016.
