= Feminist literary criticism =

Literary criticism informed by feminist theory

Feminist literary criticism is literary criticism informed by feminist theory, or more broadly, by the politics of feminism. It uses the principles and ideologies of feminism to critique the language of literature. This school of thought seeks to analyze and describe the ways in which literature portrays the narrative of male domination by exploring the economic, social, political, and psychological forces embedded within literature. This way of thinking and criticizing works can be said to have changed the way literary texts are viewed and studied, as well as changing and expanding the canon of what is commonly taught.

Traditionally, feminist literary criticism has sought to examine old texts within literary canon through a new lens. Specific goals of feminist criticism include the development and discovery of female literary tradition, rediscovering historical texts, interpreting symbolism found in women's writing so that it will not be lost or ignored by the male point of view, and resisting sexism inherent in the majority of mainstream literature. These goals, along with the intent to analyze literature written by women from a female perspective while simultaneously increasing cultural awareness of the sexual politics of language and style, were developed by Lisa Tuttle in the 1980s, and have since been adopted by a majority of feminist critics.

The history of feminist literary criticism is extensive, from classic works of nineteenth-century female authors such as George Eliot and Margaret Fuller to cutting-edge theoretical work in women's studies and gender studies by "third-wave" authors. Before the 1970s—in the first and second waves of feminism—feminist literary criticism was concerned with women's authorship and the representation of women's condition within the literature; in particular the depiction of fictional female characters. The feminist wave model is useful to identify important surges in history, however, a lot of feminist literary work was still done in between waves. Using the wave model may diminish some of that work. In addition, feminist literary criticism is concerned with the exclusion of women from the literary canon, with theorists such as Lois M. Tyson suggesting that this is because the views of women authors are often not considered to be universal.

Additionally, feminist criticism has been closely associated with the birth and growth of queer studies. Modern feminist literary theory seeks to understand both the literary portrayals and representation of women and people in the queer community, expanding the role of a variety of identities and analysis within feminist literary criticism.

== Methods ==
Feminist scholarship has developed a variety of ways to unpack literature in order to understand its essence through a feminist lens. Scholars under the camp known as Feminine Critique sought to divorce literary analysis away from abstract, diction-based arguments and instead tailored their criticism to more "grounded" pieces of literature (plot, characters, etc.) and recognize the perceived implicit misogyny of the structure of the story itself. Others schools of thought such as gynocriticism—which is considered a 'female' perspective on women's writings—uses a historicist approach to literature by exposing exemplary female scholarship in literature and the ways in which their relation to gender structure relayed in their portrayal of both fiction and reality in their texts. Gynocriticism was introduced during the time of second wave feminism. Elaine Showalter suggests that feminist critique is an "ideological, righteous, angry, and admonitory search for the sins and errors of the past," and says gynocriticism enlists "the grace of imagination in a disinterested search for the essential difference of women's writing."

Contemporary feminist literary scholarship may use intersectional approaches to examine how gender interacts with race, class, sexuality and other aspects of identity. Such approaches have been used to analyze representations of women, gender, relations and patriarchal structures in literary texts. Scholars have also examined works by women writers that received limited attention because of historical restrictions on women`s participation in literary and cultural institutions

Women have also began to employ anti-patriarchal themes to protest the historical censorship of literature written by women. The rise of decadent feminist literature in the 1990s was meant to directly challenge the sexual politics of the patriarchy. By employing a wide range of female sexual exploration and lesbian and queer identities by those like Rita Felski and Judith Bennet, women were able attract more attention towards feminist topics in literature.

Since the development of more complex conceptions of gender and subjectivity and third-wave feminism, feminist literary criticism has taken a variety of new routes, namely in the tradition of the Frankfurt School's critical theory, which analyzes how the dominant ideology of a subject influences societal understanding. It has also considered gender in the terms of Freudian and Lacanian psychoanalysis, as part of the deconstruction of existing relations of power, and as a concrete political investment. The more traditionally central feminist concern with the representation and politics of women's lives has continued to play an active role in criticism. More specifically, modern feminist criticism deals with those issues related to the perceived intentional and unintentional patriarchal programming within key aspects of society including education, politics, and the work force.

Modern feminist literary critics also seek ask how feminist, literary, and critical the critique practices are, with scholars such as Susan Lanser looking to improve both literature analysis and the analyzer's own practices to be more diverse.

== History and criticism ==
While the beginning of more mainstream feminist literary criticism is typically considered during second-wave feminism, there are multiple works predating that era which offered significant contributions to the field. Feminist literary criticism can be traced back to medieval times, with some arguing that The Wife of Bath's Tale, authored by Geoffrey Chaucer and included in The Canterbury Tales, could be an example of early feminist literary critique. First-wave feminism, occurring during the 19th and early 20th centuries, similarly contributed the presence of women within the literary sphere. 1929's A Room of One's Own by Virginia Woolf is undoubtedly considered one of these formative texts. In it, Woolf argues that in order to write creatively and be critically successful, a woman must be able to own her own space and have financial stability. Although the basis of the narrative centers Woolf speaking at a conference for women's literature, she speculates that there is still a long way to go for women and so-called 'women's issues' in creative space, especially based on the educational inequity Woolf observed between men and women.

Modern feminist literary criticism finds most of its roots in the 1960s second-wave feminist movements. Beginning with the interrogation of male-centric literature that portrayed women in a demeaning and oppressive model, theorists such as Mary Ellmann, Kate Millett and Germaine Greer challenged past imaginations of women within literary scholarship. Within second-wave feminism, three phases can be defined: the feminine phase, the feminist phase, and the female phase. During the feminine phase, female writers adhered to male values. In the feminist phase, there was a theme of criticism of women's role in society. And in the female phase, it was now accepted that women's writing was valid, and the works were less combative than in the feminist phase.

Susan Lanser suggested changing the name of feminist literary criticism to "critical literary feminism" to change the focus from the criticism to the feminism, and points out that writing such works requires "consciousness of political context." In a similar vein, Elaine Showalter became a leading critic in the gynocritical method with her work A Literature of their Own in 1977. By this time, scholars were not only interested in simply demarcating narratives of oppression but also creating a literary space for past, present, and future female literary scholars to substantiate their experience in a genuine way that appreciates the aesthetic form of their works.

Additionally, Black literary feminist scholars began to emerge, in the post-Civil Rights era of the United States, as a response to the masculine-centric narratives of Black empowerment began to gain momentum over female voices. Although not a "critical" text, The Black Woman: An Anthology, edited by Cade (1970) is seen as essential to the rise of Black literary criticism and theory. Its compilation of poems, short stories, and essays gave rise to new institutionally supported forms of Black literary scholarship. The Combahee River Collective released what is called one of the most famous pieces in Black literary scholarship known as "A Black Feminist Statement" (1977), which sought to assert that literary feminism was an important component to black female liberation.

In 1979 Sandra Gilbert and Susan Gubar published The Madwoman in the Attic, an analysis of women's poetry and prose, and how it fits into the larger feminist literary canon. This publication has become a staple of feminist criticism and has expanded the realm of publications considered to be feminist works, especially in the 19th century. The book specifically argues that women have largely been considered in two distinct categories by men in academia: monsters or angels. Gilbert and Gubar argued that being trapped in these categories relegated women writers to specific areas of literature and writing, leaving the rest open only to men, and causing a distinct anxiety in women's writers to stay specifically within those categories or be ridiculed. Gilbert and Gubar's specific focus on literary criticism in the realm of poetry and other short pieces has further expanded the possibilities of feminist literary contributions, as they were previously seen as less influential in comparison to longer works. Today, writers like Gloria E. Anzaldúa have been able to contribute to the feminist canon, while still working with writing forms other than full-sized novels.

In the 1980s, Hazel Carby, Barbara Christian, bell hooks, Nellie McKay, Valerie Smith, Hortense Spillers, Eleanor Traylor, Cheryl Wall and Sheryl Ann Williams all contributed heavily to the Black Feminist Scholarship of the period. During that same time, Deborah E. McDowell published New Directions for Black Feminist Criticism, which called for a more theoretical school of criticism versus the current writings, which she deemed overly practical. In this essay McDowell also extensively discussed black women's portrayal in literature, and how it came across as even more negative than white women's portrayal. As time moved forward, the theory began to disperse in ideology. Many decided to shift towards the nuanced psychological factors of the Black experience and further away from broad sweeping generalizations. Others began to connect their works to the politics of lesbianism. Some decided to analyze the Black experience through their relationship to the Western world. Regardless, these scholars continue to employ a variety of methods to explore the identity of Black feminism in literature.

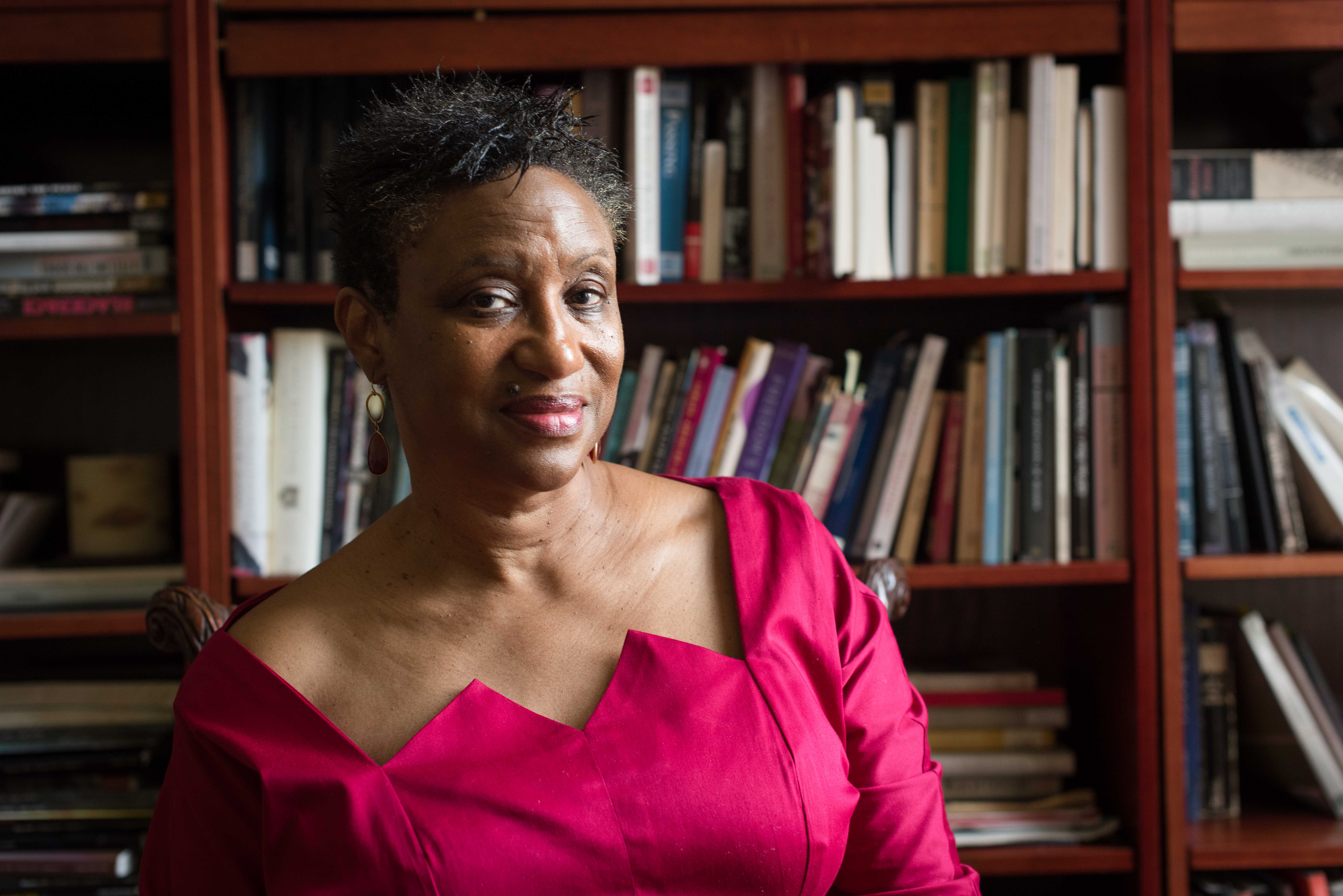
Deborah E McDowell

French scholars such as Julia Kristeva, Hélène Cixous, Luce Irigaray and Bracha L. Ettinger introduced psychoanalytic discourses into their work by way of Sigmund Freud and Jacques Lacan as a way to truly "get to the root" of feminine anxieties within text to manifest broader societal truths about the place of women. Current feminist scholars in the field of literature include Hortense Spillers, Nancy Armstrong, Annette Kolodny and Irene Tayler who all come from a variety of backgrounds who use their own nuanced and subjective experiences to inform their understanding of feminist literature. Currently, several university scholars all employ the usage of literary feminism when critiquing texts. The mainstreaming of this school has given academia an extremely useful tool in raising questions over the gender relationships within texts.

== Modern applications ==
Over the course of the second half of twentieth century, feminist literary criticism has expanded to include a significantly broader spectrum of identities under the umbrella term of 'feminism'. Third-wave feminist theory has begun to include more identities and aspects of intersectionality, and feminist literary criticism has followed suit. Third-wave feminism and feminist literary criticism is concerned more with the intersection of race and other feminist concerns. As a result, the variety and nature of texts examined has grown to include more works from transnational perspectives, while maintaining its roots in analyzing how male dominated society effects the interpretation and creation of literature. At the same time, new feminist literary critics examine the universal images used by women writers to uncover the unconscious symbolism women have used to describe themselves, their world, and female society throughout history to uncover specifically feminine language in literature. New Feminist literature and criticism often minimizes the focus on male influences and disruptions in a woman's text by socio-political hegemony to better uncover the universal unconscious of the female mind in its own context.
