= Sandra Gilbert =

American literary critic and poet (1936–2024)

- Born: Sandra Ellen Mortola; December 27, 1936; New York City, U.S.
- Died: November 10, 2024 (aged 87); Berkeley, California, U.S.
- Education: Cornell University (B.A.); New York University (M.A.); Columbia University (Ph.D.)
- Occupations: Literary critic; poet
- Spouse: Elliot Gilbert (m. 1957; died 1991)
- Partners: David Gale (died 2008); Dick Frieden
- Children: 3
- Writing career
- Subjects: Feminist literary criticism
- Notable work: The Madwoman in the Attic

Sandra Mortola Gilbert (born Sandra Ellen Mortola; December 27, 1936 – November 10, 2024) was an American literary critic and poet who published in the fields of feminist literary criticism, feminist theory, and psychoanalytic criticism. She was best known for her collaborative critical work with Susan Gubar, with whom she co-authored, among other works, The Madwoman in the Attic (1979). Madwoman in the Attic is widely recognized as a text central to second-wave feminism. She was Professor Emerita of English at the University of California, Davis.

== Background ==
Sandra Ellen Mortola was born in New York City on December 27, 1936, and grew up in Jackson Heights, Queens. In 1957, she married Elliot Gilbert.

Gilbert received her B.A. from Cornell University, her M.A. from New York University, and her Ph.D. in English literature from Columbia University in 1968.

== Career ==
Gilbert taught at UC Davis, where she served on the English faculty from 1975 until her retirement in 2005. She also taught at California State University, Hayward, Williams College, Johns Hopkins University, Stanford University, and Indiana University. She held the C. Barnwell Straut Chair of English at Princeton University from 1985 until 1989.

According to reports in The New York Times, Gilbert, along with Emory Elliott, Valerie Smith, and Margaret Doody all resigned from Princeton in 1989. The reports suggest that the four were unhappy with the leniency shown to Thomas McFarland after he was accused of sexual misconduct. McFarland was initially put on a one-year suspension, but eventually took early retirement after these resignations and threats of student boycotts.

She was named the inaugural M. H. Abrams Distinguished Visiting Professor at Cornell University for spring 2007, and the Lurie Distinguished Visiting Professor in the Creative Writing MFA program at San Jose State University in 2009.

=== Collaboration with Susan Gubar ===
Gilbert and Gubar met in the early 1970s at Indiana University. In 1974, they collaborated to co-teach a course on literature in English by women; their lectures led to the manuscript for Madwoman in the Attic. They continued to co-author and co-edit, and were jointly awarded several academic distinctions. Notably, they were jointly named Ms. magazine's "Woman of the Year" in 1986 for their work as head editors of The Norton Anthology of Literature by Women: The Traditions in English.

Because of the success of their joint publications, Gilbert and Gubar are often cited together in the fields of Feminist literary criticism and Feminist theory.

=== Feminist literary criticism and theory ===
Gilbert's critical and theoretical works, particularly those co-authored with Gubar, are generally identified as texts within the realm of second-wave feminism.

==== "The Anxiety of Authorship" ====
In The Madwoman in the Attic, Gilbert and Gubar take the Oedipal model of the anxiety of influence developed by literary critic Harold Bloom, centred around writers' Oedipal fear and jealousy for their perceived literary "fore-fathers", and adapt it to their own purposes as feminist critics. According to Bloom's theory, the developing writer must struggle to break free from his most immediate, direct influences, to form his own voice, and to break away from identification to find his own imaginative space. Gilbert and Gubar extend this male-oriented model to incorporate a female "Anxiety of Authorship", whereby lack of predecessors makes the very act of writing problematic.

Where Bloom wonders how the male author can find a voice that is his own, Gilbert and Gubar – building on Virginia Woolf's analysis of the "difficulty...that they had no tradition behind them" – emphasise the problem a woman writer may have in seeing herself as possessing a literary voice at all, given the absence of a maternal precursor. Where Bloom finds aggression and competition between male literary figures in terms of self-consciously feeling influenced and desiring to be influential, the "anxiety of authorship" identifies a "secret sisterhood" of role models within the Western tradition who show that women can write, the recuperation of the tradition of which becomes a feminist project. However, these models too may be "infected" with a lack of confidence, and with internal contradiction of ambition, hampered by the culturally induced assumption of "the patriarchal authority of art."

In later works, the pair explore "the 'double bind' of the woman poet...the contradictions between her vocation and her gender" (Shakespeare's Sisters), as well as the development (in the wake of Sylvia Plath) of a new genre of 'mother poets'.

== Personal life and death ==
Gilbert lived in Berkeley, California, and, until 2008, in Paris, France. Her husband, Elliot L. Gilbert, with whom she had three children, was chair of the Department of English at University of California, Davis, until his death from surgical complications in 1991. His death was the subject of her 1995 book Wrongful Death: A Medical Tragedy; she sued for medical malpractice, and received a settlement.

Gilbert also had a long-term relationship with David Gale, mathematician at University of California, Berkeley, until his death in 2008. She later began a relationship with Dick Frieden.

On November 10, 2024, Gilbert died from chronic obstructive pulmonary disease at Alta Bates Summit Medical Center in Berkeley, California, at the age of 87.

== Published works ==
=== Critical works ===
- "I, TOO, WILL BE "UNCLE SANDRA"". Titanic Operas. Archived from the original on July 15, 2010.
- Acts of Attention: The Poems of D.H. Lawrence (Cornell University Press, 1972)

=== Poetry ===
- In the Fourth World (University of Alabama Press, 1979)
- The Summer Kitchen (Heyeck Press, 1983)
- Emily's Bread (W. W. Norton, 1984)
- Blood Pressure (W. W. Norton, 1989)
- Ghost Volcano (W. W. Norton, 1997)
- Kissing the Bread: New and Selected Poems 1969-1999 (W. W. Norton, 2000)
- The Italian Collection (Depot Books, 2003)
- Belongings (W. W. Norton, 2006)
- Aftermath: Poems (W. W. Norton, 2011)

=== Non-fiction ===
- Wrongful Death: A Medical Tragedy (W. W. Norton, 1995)
- Death's Door: Modern Dying and The Ways We Grieve (W. W. Norton, 2006)
- Rereading Women: Thirty Years of Exploring Our Literary Traditions (W. W. Norton, 2011)
- The Culinary Imagination: From Myth to Modernity (W. W. Norton, 2014)
