= Elizabeth Hands =

English poet

Elizabeth Hands (pen name, Daphne; 1746–1815) was an English poet.

== Early life ==
Elizabeth Herbert was born in Harbury, 1746. Before the birth of her daughter she worked as a domestic servant for at least one family in Warwickshire, in the area between Rugby and Coventry.

== Career ==
By 1785, when her daughter was born, she was married to a blacksmith, Mr. Hands. They lived near Rugby.

Poems written by Hands using the pseudonym "Daphne" were published in Jopson's Coventry Mercury. Among those impressed by her work was Thomas James, the headmaster of Rugby School. In 1789 the school's press published by subscription a book of her poems, The Death of Amnon. A Poem, with an Appendix: containing Pastorals, and other Poetical Pieces. It is not known whether Hands continued writing after the publication of Amnon. The classics master at Rugby school, Philip Bracebridge Homer, used his extensive network of contacts in clerical and literary circles to secure 1,200 subscribers for The Death of Amnon, including members of the nobility from across England and members of parliament such as Edmund Burke and Charles James Fox. The volume was reviewed in several important literary journals of the period: the Gentleman's Magazine, the Monthly Review and the politically radical Analytical Review.

== Style and themes ==
Hands' poems treat a wide variety of subjects and are frequently satirical. The Death of Amnon, a long poem in blank verse (regarded as the most serious and prestigious poetic metre by eighteenth-century literary theorists), divided into five cantos, tells the violent and sombre biblical story of how King David's son Amnon raped his sister Tamar and was killed by their half brother Absalom. Other poems, mostly in more informal iambic tetrameter, concentrate on themes that were conventional for the pastoral mode in poetry (love, friendship, loss, the seasons, the country versus the city life), as well as poetics ("On Reading Pope's Eloisa to Abelard", "Critical Fragments on some of the English Poets"), philosophical topics ("Observation on the Works of Nature"; "Friendship. An Ode"), and occasional observations from everyday life ("Written while the Author sat on a Cock of Hay"; "On an Unsociable Family").

Literary and social historians have highlighted Hands' astute management of how her poems' would be interpreted by eighteenth-century literary journalists and general readers. Her ironic handling of how her poems would be judged was intended to cause her social superiors discomfort. Hands' anticipation of her poems' reception is especially evident in the first two poems in the Appendix: "A Poem, On the Supposition of an Advertisement appearing in a Morning Paper, of the Publication of a Volume of Poems, by a Servant Maid" and "A Poem, On the Supposition of the Book having been published and read". These poems present readers with scenarios in which the volume of poems they are holding – and its author – are being commented on by members of the rural gentry. The two "Suppositions" satirise the manners and taste of various bourgeois personages, showing the impoverished state of their literary judgement, at the same time that those personages ("Miss Coquettilla", "Miss Prudella", "Mrs Domestic", "Timothy Turtle", "Captain Bonair", and others) dismiss Hands' poetry because it is written by a servant. In "A Poem, On the Supposition of an Advertisement appearing in a Morning Paper, of the Publication of a Volume of Poems, by a Servant Maid", Hands shows the assembled characters' incredulity and disdain, while allowing the reader to see that she knows more than they do:

A servant write verses! says Madame du Bloom;
Pray what is the subject – a Mop or a Broom?
He, he, he, says Miss Flounce; I suppose we shall see
An Ode on a Dishclout – what else can it be?

Clifford Siskin argues that the satire of the second "Supposition" is directed at all those people who discussed the book at social gatherings (or subscribed to the volume and received a copy), but never read it. Carolyn Steedman describes the "Suppositions" as "intentionally offensive, and wonderfully so", and shows how Hands manages to suggest the limitedness of her superiors' worldview and critical powers.

== Bibliography ==
- Baines, Paul; Ferraro, Julian; Rogers, Pat (28 December 2010). The Wiley-Blackwell Encyclopedia of Eighteenth-Century Writers and Writing 1660 - 1789. John Wiley & Sons. ISBN 978-1-4443-9008-7.

== See also ==
- List of 18th-century British working-class writers
