= The Madwoman in the Attic =

Work of feminist literary criticism on Victorian literature

- Author: Sandra Gilbert; Susan Gubar
- Language: English
- Subject: Victorian literature
- Publication date: 1979
- Publication place: United States
- Media type: Print

The Madwoman in the Attic: The Woman Writer and the Nineteenth-Century Literary Imagination is a 1979 book by Sandra Gilbert and Susan Gubar, in which they examine Victorian literature from a feminist perspective. Gilbert and Gubar draw their title from Charlotte Brontë's Jane Eyre, in which Rochester's wife (née Bertha Mason) is kept secretly locked in an attic apartment by her husband.

== The text ==
The text specifically examines Jane Austen, Mary Shelley, Charlotte and Emily Brontë, George Eliot, Elizabeth Barrett Browning, Christina Rossetti and Emily Dickinson.

In the work, Gilbert and Gubar examine the notion that women writers of the nineteenth century were confined in their writing to make their female characters either embody the "angel" or the "monster", a struggle which they argue stemmed from male writers' tendencies to categorize female characters as either pure, angelic women or rebellious, unkempt madwomen. In their argument Gilbert and Gubar point to Virginia Woolf, who says women writers must "kill the aesthetic ideal through which they themselves have been 'killed' into art". While it may be easy to construe that feminist writers embody the "madwoman" or "monster", Gilbert and Gubar stress the importance of killing off both figures because neither accurately represents women or women writers. Instead, Gilbert and Gubar urge female writers to strive for autonomous self-definition beyond this dichotomy, which they see as imposed by a reductionist patriarchal view of women's roles.

They also explore the way women were inhibited in their writing by what they called the Anxiety of Authorship – the lack of legitimating role-models for the nineteenth-century woman writer. One result was what they identified as the literary palimpsest or double-voiced text – one with a feminist subtext hidden within a more conventional narrative, so that "surface designs conceal or obscure deeper, less socially acceptable levels of meaning".

== Feminist criticism ==
Over 700 pages long, the work is an early landmark in feminist literary criticism. While some have stated that it has become outdated, and that the metaphoric framework outlined by Gilbert and Gubar is limiting, essentialist, self-referential, and insufficiently aware of the varying individual circumstances, it remains a cornerstone work in the field.

Originally published in 1979 by Yale University Press, a second edition was released in 2000 by Yale Nota Bene. In 2022, it was reissued by Yale University Press.

== Collaboration ==
Gilbert and Gubar have continued to write criticism together, examining Shakespeare and Modernist writing, among other topics.
