= Susan Gubar =

American author and Professor Emerita

Susan D. Gubar
- Born: November 30, 1944 (age 81)
- Occupations: Author, distinguished professor emerita
- Notable work: The Madwoman in the Attic (1979)

Susan D. Gubar (born November 30, 1944) is an American author and distinguished Professor Emerita of English and Women's Studies at Indiana University.

She is best known for co-authoring the landmark feminist literary study The Madwoman in the Attic: The Woman Writer and the Nineteenth-Century Literary Imagination (1979) with Sandra Gilbert. She has also written a trilogy on women's writing in the 20th century. Her honours include the Ivan Sandrof Lifetime Achievement Award and the MLA Award for Lifetime Scholarly Achievement.

== Education ==
Gubar received an BA from the City College of New York, an MA from the University of Michigan, and a PhD from the University of Iowa.

== Career ==
Gubar joined the faculty of Indiana University in 1973, at a time when there were three female professors among the 70 in its English department.

Gubar and Gilbert edited the Norton Anthology of Literature by Women: The Traditions in English, published in 1985 (ISBN 0393019403); its publication resulted in both of them being included among Ms.'s women of the year in 1986.

Her book Judas: A Biography, was published in 2009 by W.W. Norton (ISBN 9780393064834). Her other writings include essays on the relationship between Judaism and feminism, and the role of poetry in Holocaust remembrance.

In December 2009, Gubar retired from Indiana University at age 65, due to complications following a November 2008 diagnosis of advanced ovarian cancer. The "wrenching story" of her subsequent medical treatment (in which she underwent a "debulking" surgery which included the removal of her appendix, uterus, ovaries, fallopian tubes, and part of her intestines) led her to write Memoir of a Debulked Woman (2012, ISBN 978-0-393-07325-6). She continues her story as a blogger in "Living with Cancer" for The New York Times. A chaired appointment at Indiana is now named for Gubar.

Gubar was elected to the American Philosophical Society in 2011.

In 2012, she and her longtime collaborator Sandra M. Gilbert were awarded the Ivan Sandrof Lifetime Achievement Award of the National Book Critics Circle.

In 2020, she received the Award for Lifetime Scholarly Achievement from the Modern Languages Association.

== Bibliography ==
=== With Sandra M. Gilbert ===
- The Madwoman in the Attic: The Woman Writer and the 19th-Century Literary Imagination
- Shakespeare’s Sisters: Feminist Essays on Women Poets
- A Guide to "The Norton Anthology of Literature by Women: The Tradition in English"
- The War of the Words, Volume I of No Man's Land: The Place of the Woman Writer in the Twentieth Century
- Sexchanges, Volume II of No Man's Land: The Place of the Woman Writer in the Twentieth Century
- Letters from the Front, Volume III of No Man's Land: The Place of the Woman Writer in the Twentieth Century
- Masterpiece Theatre: An Academic Melodrama

She also edited:

- Women Poets, Special Double Issue of Women's Studies
- The Norton Anthology of Literature by Women: The Tradition in English
- The Female Imagination and the Modernist Aesthetic , also published as a Special Double Issue of Women’s Studies (Vol. 13, no. 1 & 2 (1986))
- MotherSongs: Poetry by, for, and about Mothers also with Diana O’Hehir

=== With others ===
Edited:

- For Adult Users Only: The Dilemma of Violent Pornography with Joan Hoff
- English Inside and Out: The Places of Literary Criticism, Papers from the 50th Meeting of the English Institute, with Jonathan Kamholtz
