= Clifford Siskin =

American scholar

Clifford Siskin is an American scholar whose work focuses on the Age of Enlightenment, Romantic literature, media and technology, and the history of knowledge. He is Henry W. and Albert A. Berg Professor of English and American Literature Emeritus at New York University. Previously he taught at Columbia University as the George Delacorte Professor of the Humanities, the University of Glasgow as the A. C. Bradley Professor, Oxford University as a Waynflete Lecturer, Stony Brook University, and Wayne State University. He has also been visiting fellow at The Leverhulme Centre for the Future of Intelligence at the University of Cambridge and a visiting scholar at Stanford University.

Siskin’s work, along with that of Mary Poovey and John Guillory, has been identified as part of an "NYU brand" of literary scholarship, characterized by its “demystified,” often sociological understanding of literary studies, and considered to be as influential in the discipline as the Yale school and the New Historicism. The publication of his 2010 book, This Is Enlightenment, co-edited with William Warner, was described as a major “event” in the study of literary history, the Enlightenment, and Romantic literature, and contributed to widespread interest within literary studies in the history of media.

Siskin is founder and director of The Re:Enlightenment Project, a group of scholars working on the history of knowledge, particularly the legacy of the Age of Enlightenment.

== Education ==
Siskin received a BA from Stanford University in 1972. He did his graduate study at University of Virginia, where he earned an MA in 1975 and a PhD in 1978.

== Works ==
- Siskin, Clifford (1988). The Historicity of Romantic Discourse. Oxford: Oxford University Press. ISBN 9780195044706.
- Siskin, Clifford (1998). The Work of Writing: Literature and Social Change in Britain, 1700-1830. Baltimore: Johns Hopkins University Press. ISBN 0801856965.
- Siskin, Clifford and William Warner (eds.) (2010). This Is Enlightenment. Chicago: University of Chicago Press. ISBN 9780226761473.
- Siskin, Clifford (2016). System: The Shaping of Modern Knowledge. Cambridge: The MIT Press. ISBN 9780262035316.
